= Acrocercops albidorsella =

Scientific classification
- Domain: Eukaryota
- Kingdom: Animalia
- Phylum: Arthropoda
- Class: Insecta
- Order: Lepidoptera
- Family: Gracillariidae
- Genus: Acrocercops
- Species: A. albidorsella

Binomial name
- Acrocercops albidorsella Bradley, 1957

Species of moth

Acrocercops albidorsella is a moth of the family Gracillariidae, known from Guadalcanal Island and Rennell Island, in the Solomon Islands. It was described by J.D. Bradley in 1957.
