= Acrocercops clisiopa =

Scientific classification
- Kingdom: Animalia
- Phylum: Arthropoda
- Clade: Pancrustacea
- Class: Insecta
- Order: Lepidoptera
- Family: Gracillariidae
- Genus: Acrocercops
- Species: A. clisiopa

Binomial name
- Acrocercops clisiopa Meyrick, 1935

Species of moth

Acrocercops clisiopa is a species of moth in the family Gracillariidae, known from Taiwan. It was first described by Edward Meyrick in 1935. The host plant is Macaranga tanarius.
