= Acrocercops obscurella =

Scientific classification
- Domain: Eukaryota
- Kingdom: Animalia
- Phylum: Arthropoda
- Class: Insecta
- Order: Lepidoptera
- Family: Gracillariidae
- Genus: Acrocercops
- Species: A. obscurella

Binomial name
- Acrocercops obscurella (Turner, 1894)

Synonyms
- Gracilaria obscurella Turner, 1894

Species of moth

Acrocercops obscurella is a moth of the family Gracillariidae. It is known from Queensland, Australia.
