= Acrocercops strophiaula =

Scientific classification
- Kingdom: Animalia
- Phylum: Arthropoda
- Clade: Pancrustacea
- Class: Insecta
- Order: Lepidoptera
- Family: Gracillariidae
- Genus: Acrocercops
- Species: A. strophiaula

Binomial name
- Acrocercops strophiaula Meyrick, 1935

Species of moth

Acrocercops strophiaula is a moth of the family Gracillariidae. It is known from Indonesia (Java).

The larvae feed on Schima noronhae. They probably mine the leaves of their host plant.
