= Acrocercops pyrigenes =

Scientific classification
- Domain: Eukaryota
- Kingdom: Animalia
- Phylum: Arthropoda
- Class: Insecta
- Order: Lepidoptera
- Family: Gracillariidae
- Genus: Acrocercops
- Species: A. pyrigenes

Binomial name
- Acrocercops pyrigenes (Turner, 1896)

Synonyms
- Gracilaria pyrigenes Turner, 1896; Gracilaria nitidula Turner, 1894

Species of moth

Acrocercops pyrigenes is a moth of the family Gracillariidae. It is known from Queensland, Australia.
