= Acrocercops allactopa =

Acrocercops aellomacha

Scientific classification
- Domain: Eukaryota
- Kingdom: Animalia
- Phylum: Arthropoda
- Class: Insecta
- Order: Lepidoptera
- Family: Gracillariidae
- Genus: Acrocercops
- Species: A. allactopa

Binomial name
- Acrocercops allactopa Meyrick, 1916

Species of moth

Acrocercops allactopa is a moth of the family Gracillariidae, known from Karnataka, India. The hostplants for the species include Eugenia cumini and Eugenia jambolana.
