= Acrocercops walsinghami =

Scientific classification
- Domain: Eukaryota
- Kingdom: Animalia
- Phylum: Arthropoda
- Class: Insecta
- Order: Lepidoptera
- Family: Gracillariidae
- Genus: Acrocercops
- Species: A. walsinghami

Binomial name
- Acrocercops walsinghami (Rebel, 1907)

Synonyms
- Coriscium (Acrocercops) walsinghami Rebel, 1907

Species of moth

Acrocercops walsinghami is a moth of the family Gracillariidae. It is known from Yemen.
