= Acrocercops unilineata =

Scientific classification
- Domain: Eukaryota
- Kingdom: Animalia
- Phylum: Arthropoda
- Class: Insecta
- Order: Lepidoptera
- Family: Gracillariidae
- Genus: Acrocercops
- Species: A. unilineata

Binomial name
- Acrocercops unilineata (Turner, 1894)

Synonyms
- Gracilaria unilineata Turner, 1894

Species of moth

Acrocercops unilineata is a moth of the family Gracillariidae. It is known from Queensland, Australia.
