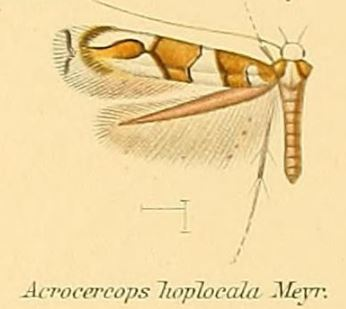

Scientific classification
- Domain: Eukaryota
- Kingdom: Animalia
- Phylum: Arthropoda
- Class: Insecta
- Order: Lepidoptera
- Family: Gracillariidae
- Genus: Acrocercops
- Species: A. hoplocala

Binomial name
- Acrocercops hoplocala (Meyrick, 1880)

Synonyms
- Gracilaria hoplocala Meyrick, 1880

= Acrocercops hoplocala =

Species of moth

Acrocercops hoplocala is a moth of the family Gracillariidae. It is known from New South Wales and Queensland, Australia.

The larvae feed on Eucalyptus botryoides and Eucalyptus robustus. They mine the leaves of their host plant.
