= Acrocercops thylacaula =

Scientific classification
- Kingdom: Animalia
- Phylum: Arthropoda
- Class: Insecta
- Order: Lepidoptera
- Family: Gracillariidae
- Genus: Acrocercops
- Species: A. thylacaula

Binomial name
- Acrocercops thylacaula Meyrick, 1932

Species of moth

Acrocercops thylacaula is a moth of the family Gracillariidae. It is known from India (Maharashtra).

The larvae feed on Allophylus cobbe. They mine the leaves of their host plant.
