= Acrocercops theaeformisella =

Scientific classification
- Kingdom: Animalia
- Phylum: Arthropoda
- Class: Insecta
- Order: Lepidoptera
- Family: Gracillariidae
- Genus: Acrocercops
- Species: A. theaeformisella

Binomial name
- Acrocercops theaeformisella Paulian & Viette, 1955

Species of moth

Acrocercops theaeformisella is a moth of the family Gracillariidae. It is known from Madagascar.

The larvae feed on Aphloia theiformis. They probably mine the leaves of their host plant.
