= Acrocercops distylii =

Scientific classification
- Kingdom: Animalia
- Phylum: Arthropoda
- Class: Insecta
- Order: Lepidoptera
- Family: Gracillariidae
- Genus: Acrocercops
- Species: A. distylii

Binomial name
- Acrocercops distylii Kumata & Kuroko, 1988

Species of moth

Acrocercops distylii is a moth of the family Gracillariidae. It is known from Japan (Honshū, Kyūshū, Shikoku, Tusima and the Ryukyu Islands).

The wingspan is 8.5–11 mm.

The larvae feed on Distylium racemusum. They mine the leaves of their host plant.
