= Acrocercops chenopa =

Scientific classification
- Kingdom: Animalia
- Phylum: Arthropoda
- Class: Insecta
- Order: Lepidoptera
- Family: Gracillariidae
- Genus: Acrocercops
- Species: A. chenopa

Binomial name
- Acrocercops chenopa Meyrick, 1932

Species of moth

Acrocercops chenopa is a moth of the family Gracillariidae. It is known from Uganda.
