= Acrocercops soritis =

Scientific classification
- Kingdom: Animalia
- Phylum: Arthropoda
- Clade: Pancrustacea
- Class: Insecta
- Order: Lepidoptera
- Family: Gracillariidae
- Genus: Acrocercops
- Species: A. soritis

Binomial name
- Acrocercops soritis Meyrick, 1915

Species of moth

Acrocercops soritis is a moth of the family Gracillariidae. It is known from Ecuador.
