= Acrocercops paliacma =

Scientific classification
- Kingdom: Animalia
- Phylum: Arthropoda
- Class: Insecta
- Order: Lepidoptera
- Family: Gracillariidae
- Genus: Acrocercops
- Species: A. paliacma

Binomial name
- Acrocercops paliacma Meyrick, 1930

Synonyms
- Acrocercops psaliacma Meyrick, 1931

Species of moth

Acrocercops paliacma is a moth of the family Gracillariidae, known from Meghalaya and Assam, India, as well as Vietnam. It was described by Edward Meyrick in 1930.
