= Acrocercops ochrocephala =

Scientific classification
- Domain: Eukaryota
- Kingdom: Animalia
- Phylum: Arthropoda
- Class: Insecta
- Order: Lepidoptera
- Family: Gracillariidae
- Genus: Acrocercops
- Species: A. ochrocephala

Binomial name
- Acrocercops ochrocephala (Meyrick, 1880)

Synonyms
- Gracilaria ochrocephala Meyrick, 1880

Species of moth

Acrocercops ochrocephala is a moth of the family Gracillariidae. It is known from New South Wales, Australia.
