= Acrocercops zadocaea =

Scientific classification
- Kingdom: Animalia
- Phylum: Arthropoda
- Class: Insecta
- Order: Lepidoptera
- Family: Gracillariidae
- Genus: Acrocercops
- Species: A. zadocaea

Binomial name
- Acrocercops zadocaea Meyrick, 1912

Species of moth

Acrocercops zadocaea is a moth of the family Gracillariidae. It is known from Sri Lanka.
