= Acrocercops convoluta =

Scientific classification
- Domain: Eukaryota
- Kingdom: Animalia
- Phylum: Arthropoda
- Class: Insecta
- Order: Lepidoptera
- Family: Gracillariidae
- Genus: Acrocercops
- Species: A. convoluta

Binomial name
- Acrocercops convoluta Meyrick, 1908

Species of moth

Acrocercops convoluta is a moth of the family Gracillariidae, known from West Bengal, India, as well as Sri Lanka and Vietnam. It was described by Edward Meyrick in 1908.
