= Acrocercops zamenopa =

Scientific classification
- Kingdom: Animalia
- Phylum: Arthropoda
- Class: Insecta
- Order: Lepidoptera
- Family: Gracillariidae
- Genus: Acrocercops
- Species: A. zamenopa

Binomial name
- Acrocercops zamenopa Meyrick, 1934

Species of moth

Acrocercops zamenopa is a moth of the family Gracillariidae. It is known from Indonesia (Java).

The larvae feed on Coffea arabica. They probably mine the leaves of their host plant.
