= Acrocercops gemmans =

Scientific classification
- Domain: Eukaryota
- Kingdom: Animalia
- Phylum: Arthropoda
- Class: Insecta
- Order: Lepidoptera
- Family: Gracillariidae
- Genus: Acrocercops
- Species: A. gemmans

Binomial name
- Acrocercops gemmans Walsingham, 1914

Species of moth

Acrocercops gemmans is a moth of the family Gracillariidae, known from Mexico. It was described by Walsingham, Lord Thomas de Grey, in 1914.
