= Acrocercops apicepunctella =

Scientific classification
- Domain: Eukaryota
- Kingdom: Animalia
- Phylum: Arthropoda
- Class: Insecta
- Order: Lepidoptera
- Family: Gracillariidae
- Genus: Acrocercops
- Species: A. apicepunctella

Binomial name
- Acrocercops apicepunctella (Walsingham, 1891)

Synonyms
- Acrocercops apicipunctella Meyrick, 1912

Species of moth

Acrocercops apicepunctella is a moth of the family Gracillariidae, known from Saint Vincent and the Grenadines. It was named by Thomas de Grey, 6th Baron Walsingham in 1891.
