= Acrocercops antimima =

Scientific classification
- Domain: Eukaryota
- Kingdom: Animalia
- Phylum: Arthropoda
- Class: Insecta
- Order: Lepidoptera
- Family: Gracillariidae
- Genus: Acrocercops
- Species: A. antimima

Binomial name
- Acrocercops antimima Turner, 1940

Species of moth

Acrocercops antimima is a moth of the family Gracillariidae. It is known from New South Wales, Australia.

The larvae feed on Lomatia myricoides. They mine the leaves of their host plant.
