= Acrocercops iraniana =

Scientific classification
- Kingdom: Animalia
- Phylum: Arthropoda
- Clade: Pancrustacea
- Class: Insecta
- Order: Lepidoptera
- Family: Gracillariidae
- Genus: Acrocercops
- Species: A. iraniana

Binomial name
- Acrocercops iraniana Triberti, 1990

Species of moth

Acrocercops iraniana is a moth of the family Gracillariidae, known from Iran. It was described by P. Tiberti in 1990.
