= Acrocercops pectinivalva =

Scientific classification
- Kingdom: Animalia
- Phylum: Arthropoda
- Class: Insecta
- Order: Lepidoptera
- Family: Gracillariidae
- Genus: Acrocercops
- Species: A. pectinivalva

Binomial name
- Acrocercops pectinivalva Bland, 1980

Species of moth

Acrocercops pectinivalva is a moth of the family Gracillariidae. It is known from Nigeria.

The wingspan is 7 mm (0.28 in) (holotype, male).
