= Acrocercops hedymopa =

Scientific classification
- Domain: Eukaryota
- Kingdom: Animalia
- Phylum: Arthropoda
- Class: Insecta
- Order: Lepidoptera
- Family: Gracillariidae
- Genus: Acrocercops
- Species: A. hedymopa

Binomial name
- Acrocercops hedymopa Turner, 1913

Species of moth

Acrocercops hedymopa is a moth of the family Gracillariidae. It is known from Queensland, Australia, and Benin in West Africa.
