= Acrocercops maranthaceae =

Scientific classification
- Kingdom: Animalia
- Phylum: Arthropoda
- Class: Insecta
- Order: Lepidoptera
- Family: Gracillariidae
- Genus: Acrocercops
- Species: A. maranthaceae

Binomial name
- Acrocercops maranthaceae Busck, 1934

Species of moth

Acrocercops maranthaceae is a moth of the family Gracillariidae. It's known to come from Cuba.

The larvae feed on Maranta species. They mine the leaves of their host plant.
