= Acrocercops symploca =

Scientific classification
- Domain: Eukaryota
- Kingdom: Animalia
- Phylum: Arthropoda
- Class: Insecta
- Order: Lepidoptera
- Family: Gracillariidae
- Genus: Acrocercops
- Species: A. symploca

Binomial name
- Acrocercops symploca Turner, 1913

Species of moth

Acrocercops symploca is a moth of the family Gracillariidae. It is known from Queensland, Australia.

The larvae feed on Leguminosae species. They mine the leaves of their host plant.
