= Acrocercops orthostacta =

Scientific classification
- Domain: Eukaryota
- Kingdom: Animalia
- Phylum: Arthropoda
- Class: Insecta
- Order: Lepidoptera
- Family: Gracillariidae
- Genus: Acrocercops
- Species: A. orthostacta

Binomial name
- Acrocercops orthostacta Meyrick, 1918

Species of moth

Acrocercops orthostacta is a moth of the family Gracillariidae, known from Bihar, India. It was described by Edward Meyrick in 1918. The hostplant for the species is Sida cordifolia.
