= Acrocercops cordiella =

Scientific classification
- Kingdom: Animalia
- Phylum: Arthropoda
- Class: Insecta
- Order: Lepidoptera
- Family: Gracillariidae
- Genus: Acrocercops
- Species: A. cordiella

Binomial name
- Acrocercops cordiella Busck, 1934

Species of moth

Acrocercops cordiella is a moth of the family Gracillariidae. It is known from Cuba.

The larvae feed on Cordia alba. They mine the leaves of their host plant.
