= Acrocercops orianassa =

Scientific classification
- Kingdom: Animalia
- Phylum: Arthropoda
- Class: Insecta
- Order: Lepidoptera
- Family: Gracillariidae
- Genus: Acrocercops
- Species: A. orianassa

Binomial name
- Acrocercops orianassa Meyrick, 1932

Species of moth

Acrocercops orianassa is a moth of the family Gracillariidae. It is known from Ethiopia and Uganda.
