= Acrocercops caementosa =

Scientific classification
- Domain: Eukaryota
- Kingdom: Animalia
- Phylum: Arthropoda
- Class: Insecta
- Order: Lepidoptera
- Family: Gracillariidae
- Genus: Acrocercops
- Species: A. caementosa

Binomial name
- Acrocercops caementosa Meyrick, 1915

Species of moth

Acrocercops caementosa is a moth of the family Gracillariidae, known from Peru. It was described by E. Meyrick in 1915.
