= Acrocercops chrysometra =

Scientific classification
- Domain: Eukaryota
- Kingdom: Animalia
- Phylum: Arthropoda
- Class: Insecta
- Order: Lepidoptera
- Family: Gracillariidae
- Genus: Acrocercops
- Species: A. chrysometra

Binomial name
- Acrocercops chrysometra (Meyrick, 1926)

Species of moth

Acrocercops chrysometra is a moth of the family Gracillariidae, known from Ecuador. It was described by E. Meyrick in 1926.
