= Acrocercops chloronympha =

Scientific classification
- Domain: Eukaryota
- Kingdom: Animalia
- Phylum: Arthropoda
- Class: Insecta
- Order: Lepidoptera
- Family: Gracillariidae
- Genus: Acrocercops
- Species: A. chloronympha

Binomial name
- Acrocercops chloronympha Meyrick, 1921

Species of moth

Acrocercops chloronympha is a moth of the family Gracillariidae, known from Brazil. It was described by E. Meyrick in 1921.
