= Acrocercops ornata =

Scientific classification
- Domain: Eukaryota
- Kingdom: Animalia
- Phylum: Arthropoda
- Class: Insecta
- Order: Lepidoptera
- Family: Gracillariidae
- Genus: Acrocercops
- Species: A. ornata

Binomial name
- Acrocercops ornata (Walsingham, 1897)

Species of moth

Acrocercops ornata is a moth of the family Gracillariidae, known from Grenada. It was described by Thomas de Grey, 6th Baron Walsingham, in 1897.
