= Acrocercops isotoma =

Scientific classification
- Kingdom: Animalia
- Phylum: Arthropoda
- Class: Insecta
- Order: Lepidoptera
- Family: Gracillariidae
- Genus: Acrocercops
- Species: A. isotoma

Binomial name
- Acrocercops isotoma Turner, 1940

Species of moth

Acrocercops isotoma is a moth of the family Gracillariidae. It is found in Queensland, Australia.
