= Acrocercops castellata =

Scientific classification
- Domain: Eukaryota
- Kingdom: Animalia
- Phylum: Arthropoda
- Class: Insecta
- Order: Lepidoptera
- Family: Gracillariidae
- Genus: Acrocercops
- Species: A. castellata

Binomial name
- Acrocercops castellata Meyrick, 1908

Species of moth

Acrocercops castellata is a moth of the family Gracillariidae, known from Sri Lanka. It was described by E. Meyrick in 1908.
