= Acrocercops pentalocha =

Scientific classification
- Domain: Eukaryota
- Kingdom: Animalia
- Phylum: Arthropoda
- Class: Insecta
- Order: Lepidoptera
- Family: Gracillariidae
- Genus: Acrocercops
- Species: A. pentalocha

Binomial name
- Acrocercops pentalocha Meyrick, 1912

Species of moth

Acrocercops pentalocha is a moth of the family Gracillariidae, known from Karnataka, India. It was described by Edward Meyrick in 1912. The hostplant for the species is Mangifera indica.
