= Acrocercops plocamis =

Scientific classification
- Kingdom: Animalia
- Phylum: Arthropoda
- Class: Insecta
- Order: Lepidoptera
- Family: Gracillariidae
- Genus: Acrocercops
- Species: A. plocamis

Binomial name
- Acrocercops plocamis Meyrick, 1908

Species of moth

Acrocercops plocamis is a moth of the family Gracillariidae, known from Sri Lanka. It was described by Edward Meyrick in 1908.
