= Acrocercops marmaritis =

Scientific classification
- Domain: Eukaryota
- Kingdom: Animalia
- Phylum: Arthropoda
- Class: Insecta
- Order: Lepidoptera
- Family: Gracillariidae
- Genus: Acrocercops
- Species: A. marmaritis

Binomial name
- Acrocercops marmaritis Walsingham, 1914

Species of moth

Acrocercops marmaritis is a moth of the family Gracillariidae, known from Mexico. It was described by Thomas de Grey, 6th Baron Walsingham, in 1914.
