= Acrocercops praesecta =

Scientific classification
- Kingdom: Animalia
- Phylum: Arthropoda
- Class: Insecta
- Order: Lepidoptera
- Family: Gracillariidae
- Genus: Acrocercops
- Species: A. praesecta

Binomial name
- Acrocercops praesecta Meyrick, 1922

Species of moth

Acrocercops praesecta is a moth of the family Gracillariidae, known from Fiji. It was described by Edward Meyrick in 1922. The hostplants for the species include Ipomoea batatas and Merremia peltata.
