= Acrocercops poliocephala =

Scientific classification
- Domain: Eukaryota
- Kingdom: Animalia
- Phylum: Arthropoda
- Class: Insecta
- Order: Lepidoptera
- Family: Gracillariidae
- Genus: Acrocercops
- Species: A. poliocephala

Binomial name
- Acrocercops poliocephala Turner, 1913

Species of moth

Acrocercops poliocephala is a moth of the family Gracillariidae. It is known from Queensland, Australia.
