= Acrocercops hapsidota =

Scientific classification
- Kingdom: Animalia
- Phylum: Arthropoda
- Clade: Pancrustacea
- Class: Insecta
- Order: Lepidoptera
- Family: Gracillariidae
- Genus: Acrocercops
- Species: A. hapsidota

Binomial name
- Acrocercops hapsidota Meyrick, 1915

Species of moth

Acrocercops hapsidota is a moth of the family Gracillariidae, known from Guyana. It was described by Edward Meyrick in 1915.
