= Acrocercops nolckeniella =

Scientific classification
- Kingdom: Animalia
- Phylum: Arthropoda
- Clade: Pancrustacea
- Class: Insecta
- Order: Lepidoptera
- Family: Gracillariidae
- Genus: Acrocercops
- Species: A. nolckeniella

Binomial name
- Acrocercops nolckeniella (Zeller, 1877)

Species of moth

Acrocercops nolckeniella is a moth of the family Gracillariidae, known from Colombia and Guyana. It was described by P.C. Zeller in 1977. The hostplant for the species is an unidentified species of Brugmansia.
