= Acrocercops symmetropa =

Scientific classification
- Kingdom: Animalia
- Phylum: Arthropoda
- Class: Insecta
- Order: Lepidoptera
- Family: Gracillariidae
- Genus: Acrocercops
- Species: A. symmetropa

Binomial name
- Acrocercops symmetropa Meyrick, 1939

Species of moth

Acrocercops symmetropa is a moth of the family Gracillariidae. It is known from Indonesia (Java).
