= Acrocercops rhynchograpta =

Scientific classification
- Kingdom: Animalia
- Phylum: Arthropoda
- Class: Insecta
- Order: Lepidoptera
- Family: Gracillariidae
- Genus: Acrocercops
- Species: A. rhynchograpta

Binomial name
- Acrocercops rhynchograpta Meyrick, 1920

Species of moth

Acrocercops rhynchograpta is a moth of the family Gracillariidae. It is known from Brazil.
