= Acrocercops irrorata =

Scientific classification
- Domain: Eukaryota
- Kingdom: Animalia
- Phylum: Arthropoda
- Class: Insecta
- Order: Lepidoptera
- Family: Gracillariidae
- Genus: Acrocercops
- Species: A. irrorata

Binomial name
- Acrocercops irrorata (Turner, 1894)

Synonyms
- Gracilaria irrorata Turner, 1894

Species of moth

Acrocercops irrorata is a moth of the family Gracillariidae. It is known from Australia in the states of New South Wales, South Australia and Queensland.
