= Acrocercops goniodesma =

Scientific classification
- Kingdom: Animalia
- Phylum: Arthropoda
- Class: Insecta
- Order: Lepidoptera
- Family: Gracillariidae
- Genus: Acrocercops
- Species: A. goniodesma

Binomial name
- Acrocercops goniodesma Meyrick, 1934

Species of moth

Acrocercops goniodesma is a moth of the family Gracillariidae, known from Java, Indonesia. It was described by Edward Meyrick in 1934. The larvae feed on a Magnoliaceae species.
