= Acrocercops myriogramma =

Scientific classification
- Kingdom: Animalia
- Phylum: Arthropoda
- Class: Insecta
- Order: Lepidoptera
- Family: Gracillariidae
- Genus: Acrocercops
- Species: A. myriogramma

Binomial name
- Acrocercops myriogramma Meyrick, 1937

Species of moth

Acrocercops myriogramma is a moth of the family Gracillariidae, known from Uttarakhand, India. It was described by Edward Meyrick in 1937. The hostplant for the species is Mallotus philippinensis.
