= Acrocercops habroscia =

Scientific classification
- Domain: Eukaryota
- Kingdom: Animalia
- Phylum: Arthropoda
- Class: Insecta
- Order: Lepidoptera
- Family: Gracillariidae
- Genus: Acrocercops
- Species: A. habroscia

Binomial name
- Acrocercops habroscia Meyrick, 1921

Species of moth

Acrocercops habroscia is a moth of the family Gracillariidae, known from Fiji. It was described by Edward Meyrick in 1921. The hostplant for the species is Calophyllum inophyllum.
