= Acrocercops crystallopa =

Scientific classification
- Domain: Eukaryota
- Kingdom: Animalia
- Phylum: Arthropoda
- Class: Insecta
- Order: Lepidoptera
- Family: Gracillariidae
- Genus: Acrocercops
- Species: A. crystallopa

Binomial name
- Acrocercops crystallopa Meyrick, 1916

Species of moth

Acrocercops crystallopa is a moth of the family Gracillariidae, known from Karnataka, India. It was described by Edward Meyrick in 1916. The hostplants for the species include Memecylon amplexicaule and Memecylon edule.
