= Acrocercops tacita =

Scientific classification
- Domain: Eukaryota
- Kingdom: Animalia
- Phylum: Arthropoda
- Class: Insecta
- Order: Lepidoptera
- Family: Gracillariidae
- Genus: Acrocercops
- Species: A. tacita

Binomial name
- Acrocercops tacita Triberti, 2001

Species of moth

Acrocercops tacita is a moth of the family Gracillariidae. It is known from Greece (including the Peloponnisos and Rhodes) and Lebanon.

The larvae feed on Quercus coccifera. They mine the leaves of their host plant. The mine has the form of a blotch mine on the underside of the leaf.
