= Acrocercops patellata =

Scientific classification
- Kingdom: Animalia
- Phylum: Arthropoda
- Clade: Pancrustacea
- Class: Insecta
- Order: Lepidoptera
- Family: Gracillariidae
- Genus: Acrocercops
- Species: A. patellata

Binomial name
- Acrocercops patellata Meyrick, 1921

Species of moth

Acrocercops patellata is a moth of the family Gracillariidae, known from Fiji. It was described by Edward Meyrick in 1921.
