= Acrocercops tomia =

Scientific classification
- Domain: Eukaryota
- Kingdom: Animalia
- Phylum: Arthropoda
- Class: Insecta
- Order: Lepidoptera
- Family: Gracillariidae
- Genus: Acrocercops
- Species: A. tomia

Binomial name
- Acrocercops tomia Bradley, 1956

Species of moth

Acrocercops tomia is a moth of the family Gracillariidae. It is known from Lord Howe Island.
