= Acrocercops apicella =

Scientific classification
- Domain: Eukaryota
- Kingdom: Animalia
- Phylum: Arthropoda
- Class: Insecta
- Order: Lepidoptera
- Family: Gracillariidae
- Genus: Acrocercops
- Species: A. apicella

Binomial name
- Acrocercops apicella Bradley, 1957

Species of moth

Acrocercops apicella is a moth of the family Gracillariidae, known from Guadalcanal and Rennell Island of the Solomon Islands. It was named by J.D. Bradley in 1957.
