= Acrocercops chrysoplitis =

Scientific classification
- Kingdom: Animalia
- Phylum: Arthropoda
- Class: Insecta
- Order: Lepidoptera
- Family: Gracillariidae
- Genus: Acrocercops
- Species: A. chrysoplitis

Binomial name
- Acrocercops chrysoplitis Meyrick, 1937

Species of moth

Acrocercops chrysoplitis is a moth of the family Gracillariidae, known from Uttarakhand, India. It was described by Edward Meyrick in 1937. The hostplant for the species is Shorea robusta.
