= Acrocercops heterodoxa =

Scientific classification
- Domain: Eukaryota
- Kingdom: Animalia
- Phylum: Arthropoda
- Class: Insecta
- Order: Lepidoptera
- Family: Gracillariidae
- Genus: Acrocercops
- Species: A. heterodoxa

Binomial name
- Acrocercops heterodoxa Meyrick, 1912

Species of moth

Acrocercops heterodoxa is a moth of the family Gracillariidae. It is known from South Africa.
