= Acrocercops triacris =

Scientific classification
- Domain: Eukaryota
- Kingdom: Animalia
- Phylum: Arthropoda
- Class: Insecta
- Order: Lepidoptera
- Family: Gracillariidae
- Genus: Acrocercops
- Species: A. triacris

Binomial name
- Acrocercops triacris Meyrick, 1908

Species of moth

Acrocercops triacris is a moth of the family Gracillariidae. It is known from Sri Lanka.
