= Acrocercops cyma =

Scientific classification
- Domain: Eukaryota
- Kingdom: Animalia
- Phylum: Arthropoda
- Class: Insecta
- Order: Lepidoptera
- Family: Gracillariidae
- Genus: Acrocercops
- Species: A. cyma

Binomial name
- Acrocercops cyma Bradley, 1957

Species of moth

Acrocercops cyma is a moth of the family Gracillariidae. It is known from Guadalcanal and Rennell Island.
