= Acrocercops xeniella =

Scientific classification
- Kingdom: Animalia
- Phylum: Arthropoda
- Clade: Pancrustacea
- Class: Insecta
- Order: Lepidoptera
- Family: Gracillariidae
- Genus: Acrocercops
- Species: A. xeniella

Binomial name
- Acrocercops xeniella (Zeller, 1877)

Species of moth

Acrocercops xeniella is a moth of the family Gracillariidae. It is known from Colombia.
