= Acrocercops brochogramma =

Scientific classification
- Kingdom: Animalia
- Phylum: Arthropoda
- Class: Insecta
- Order: Lepidoptera
- Family: Gracillariidae
- Genus: Acrocercops
- Species: A. brochogramma

Binomial name
- Acrocercops brochogramma Meyrick, 1914

Species of moth

Acrocercops brochogramma is a moth of the family Gracillariidae, known from Guadalcanal Island in the Solomon Islands, as well as India and Sri Lanka. The hostplant for the species is an unidentified species of Hibiscus.
