= Acrocercops attenuatum =

Scientific classification
- Domain: Eukaryota
- Kingdom: Animalia
- Phylum: Arthropoda
- Class: Insecta
- Order: Lepidoptera
- Family: Gracillariidae
- Genus: Acrocercops
- Species: A. attenuatum

Binomial name
- Acrocercops attenuatum (Walsingham, 1897)

Synonyms
- Acrocercops attenuata Forbes, 1930

Species of moth

Acrocercops attenuatum is a moth of the family Gracillariidae, known from Saint Thomas Island, in the Virgin Islands. The hostplant for the species is Croton flavens.
