= Acrocercops helicomitra =

Scientific classification
- Kingdom: Animalia
- Phylum: Arthropoda
- Class: Insecta
- Order: Lepidoptera
- Family: Gracillariidae
- Genus: Acrocercops
- Species: A. helicomitra

Binomial name
- Acrocercops helicomitra Meyrick, 1924

Species of moth

Acrocercops helicomitra is a moth of the family Gracillariidae, known from Brazil. It was described by Edward Meyrick in 1924. The hostplant for the species is Gossypium herbaceum.
