= Acrocercops chalcea =

Scientific classification
- Domain: Eukaryota
- Kingdom: Animalia
- Phylum: Arthropoda
- Class: Insecta
- Order: Lepidoptera
- Family: Gracillariidae
- Genus: Acrocercops
- Species: A. chalcea

Binomial name
- Acrocercops chalcea Turner, 1926

Species of moth

Acrocercops chalcea is a moth of the family Gracillariidae. It is known from Queensland, Australia.
