= Acrocercops achnodes =

Scientific classification
- Domain: Eukaryota
- Kingdom: Animalia
- Phylum: Arthropoda
- Class: Insecta
- Order: Lepidoptera
- Family: Gracillariidae
- Genus: Acrocercops
- Species: A. achnodes

Binomial name
- Acrocercops achnodes Meyrick, 1915

Species of moth

Acrocercops achnodes is a moth of the family Gracillariidae, known from Ecuador. It was named by Edward Meyrick in 1915.
