= Acrocercops zygonoma =

Scientific classification
- Kingdom: Animalia
- Phylum: Arthropoda
- Class: Insecta
- Order: Lepidoptera
- Family: Gracillariidae
- Genus: Acrocercops
- Species: A. zygonoma

Binomial name
- Acrocercops zygonoma Meyrick, 1921

Species of moth

Acrocercops zygonoma, also known as the leafminer, is a moth of the family Gracillariidae, described in 1921 by Edward Meyrick. It is known from the province of Bihar in India.

The larvae feed on Mangifera indica (mangoes) and Gossypium (cotton) species. They probably mine the leaves of their host plant.

The species has been officially labelled a pest and prohibited from Western Australia.
