= Acrocercops rhothiastis =

Scientific classification
- Kingdom: Animalia
- Phylum: Arthropoda
- Class: Insecta
- Order: Lepidoptera
- Family: Gracillariidae
- Genus: Acrocercops
- Species: A. rhothiastis

Binomial name
- Acrocercops rhothiastis Meyrick, 1921

Species of moth

Acrocercops rhothiastis is a moth of the family Gracillariidae. It is known from Nigeria.

The larvae feed on Bridelia micrantha. They probably mine the leaves of their host plant.
