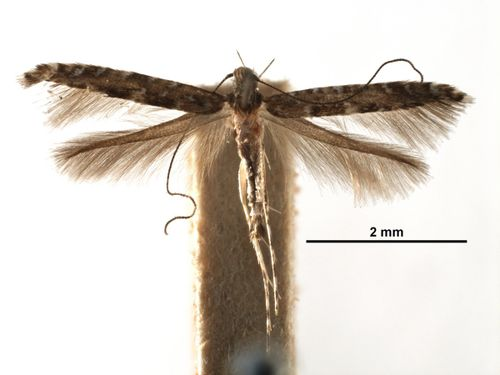

Scientific classification
- Kingdom: Animalia
- Phylum: Arthropoda
- Clade: Pancrustacea
- Class: Insecta
- Order: Lepidoptera
- Family: Gracillariidae
- Genus: Acrocercops
- Species: A. affinis

Binomial name
- Acrocercops affinis Braun, 1918

= Acrocercops affinis =

Species of moth

Acrocercops affinis is a moth of the family Gracillariidae, known from California, U.S.A.

The hostplant for the species is an unidentified species of Quercus. They mine the leaves of their host plant. The mine starts as a narrow, white line, expanding abruptly into a large, white blotch. Within the blotch, most of the parenchyma is consumed.
