= Acrocercops fuscapica =

Scientific classification
- Kingdom: Animalia
- Phylum: Arthropoda
- Class: Insecta
- Order: Lepidoptera
- Family: Gracillariidae
- Genus: Acrocercops
- Species: A. fuscapica

Binomial name
- Acrocercops fuscapica Bland, 1980

Species of moth

Acrocercops fuscapica is a moth of the family Gracillariidae. It is known from Nigeria.

The wingspan is 6 mm (0.24 in) (holotype, male).
