= Acrocercops rhombocosma =

Scientific classification
- Kingdom: Animalia
- Phylum: Arthropoda
- Clade: Pancrustacea
- Class: Insecta
- Order: Lepidoptera
- Family: Gracillariidae
- Genus: Acrocercops
- Species: A. rhombocosma

Binomial name
- Acrocercops rhombocosma Meyrick, 1911

Species of moth

Acrocercops rhombocosma is a moth of the family Gracillariidae. It is known from the Seychelles.
