= Acrocercops bifrenis =

Scientific classification
- Domain: Eukaryota
- Kingdom: Animalia
- Phylum: Arthropoda
- Class: Insecta
- Order: Lepidoptera
- Family: Gracillariidae
- Genus: Acrocercops
- Species: A. bifrenis

Binomial name
- Acrocercops bifrenis Meyrick, 1918

Species of moth

Acrocercops bifrenis is a moth of the family Gracillariidae, known from Maharashtra and Karnataka, India.

The hostplant for the species is Calycopteris floribunda. They mine the leaves of their host plant. The mine consists of a rather long blotch under the upper cuticle of the leaf.
