= Acrocercops heteroloba =

Scientific classification
- Kingdom: Animalia
- Phylum: Arthropoda
- Class: Insecta
- Order: Lepidoptera
- Family: Gracillariidae
- Genus: Acrocercops
- Species: A. heteroloba

Binomial name
- Acrocercops heteroloba Meyrick, 1932

Species of moth

Acrocercops heteroloba is a moth of the family Gracillariidae. It is known from Ethiopia.
