= Acrocercops delicata =

Scientific classification
- Domain: Eukaryota
- Kingdom: Animalia
- Phylum: Arthropoda
- Class: Insecta
- Order: Lepidoptera
- Family: Gracillariidae
- Genus: Acrocercops
- Species: A. delicata

Binomial name
- Acrocercops delicata Meyrick, 1921

Species of moth

Acrocercops delicata is a moth of the family Gracillariidae. It is known from Java, Indonesia.

The larvae feed on Nephelium lappaceum. They mine the leaves of their host plant.

== Original description ==
Wingspan 7 mm. Head and thorax white. Palpi white, with fuscous marks at apex of second joint, and middle of terminal joint. Abdomen white, apex dark fuscous except extreme tip. Forewings narrow, moderately pointed; whitish-ochreous finely speckled with fuscous; six nearly direct white fasciae edged with minute dark fuscous specks, first narrow, almost basal, second narrow, third moderate, beyond middle, last three towards apex, slender, irregular, partly confluent or connected: cilia whitish, suffused with grey round apex. Hindwings and cilia white. Java, bred from Nephelium lappaceum (Sapindaceae); three specimens
