= Acrocercops breyeri =

Scientific classification
- Domain: Eukaryota
- Kingdom: Animalia
- Phylum: Arthropoda
- Class: Insecta
- Order: Lepidoptera
- Family: Gracillariidae
- Genus: Acrocercops
- Species: A. breyeri

Binomial name
- Acrocercops breyeri Bourquin, 1962

Species of moth

Acrocercops breyeri is a moth of the family Gracillariidae, known from Argentina. The hostplant for the species is Senecio bonariensis.
