= Acrocercops eugeniella =

Scientific classification
- Domain: Eukaryota
- Kingdom: Animalia
- Phylum: Arthropoda
- Class: Insecta
- Order: Lepidoptera
- Family: Gracillariidae
- Genus: Acrocercops
- Species: A. eugeniella

Binomial name
- Acrocercops eugeniella (van Deventer, 1904)

Species of moth

Acrocercops eugeniella is a moth of the family Gracillariidae, known from Java, Indonesia, as well as Thailand. It was described by W. van Deventer in 1904. The hostplants for the species include Eugenia aquea, Eugenia cumini, and Eugenia javanica.
