= Acrocercops rhodospira =

Scientific classification
- Kingdom: Animalia
- Phylum: Arthropoda
- Class: Insecta
- Order: Lepidoptera
- Family: Gracillariidae
- Genus: Acrocercops
- Species: A. rhodospira

Binomial name
- Acrocercops rhodospira Meyrick, 1939

Species of moth

Acrocercops rhodospira is a moth of the family Gracillariidae. It is known from Indonesia (Java).

The larvae feed on Schleicheria species. They probably mine the leaves of their host plant.
