= Acrocercops phaeomorpha =

Scientific classification
- Domain: Eukaryota
- Kingdom: Animalia
- Phylum: Arthropoda
- Class: Insecta
- Order: Lepidoptera
- Family: Gracillariidae
- Genus: Acrocercops
- Species: A. phaeomorpha

Binomial name
- Acrocercops phaeomorpha Meyrick, 1919

Species of moth

Acrocercops phaeomorpha is a moth of the family Gracillariidae, known from Maharashtra, Gujarat, and Bihar, India. It was described by Edward Meyrick in 1919. The hostplant for the species is Madhuca indica, and Madhuca latifolia.
