= Acrocercops albida =

Scientific classification
- Kingdom: Animalia
- Phylum: Arthropoda
- Clade: Pancrustacea
- Class: Insecta
- Order: Lepidoptera
- Family: Gracillariidae
- Genus: Acrocercops
- Species: A. albida

Binomial name
- Acrocercops albida Turner, 1947

Species of moth

Acrocercops albida is a moth in the family Gracillariidae. It is found in Queensland, Australia.
