= Acrocercops nereis =

Scientific classification
- Domain: Eukaryota
- Kingdom: Animalia
- Phylum: Arthropoda
- Class: Insecta
- Order: Lepidoptera
- Family: Gracillariidae
- Genus: Acrocercops
- Species: A. nereis

Binomial name
- Acrocercops nereis (Meyrick, 1880)

Synonyms
- Gracilaria nereis Meyrick, 1880; Gracilaria fluorescens Turner, 1894

Species of moth

Acrocercops nereis is a moth of the family Gracillariidae. It is known in Australia from the states of New South Wales, Queensland and South Australia.
