= Acrocercops diplacopa =

Scientific classification
- Domain: Eukaryota
- Kingdom: Animalia
- Phylum: Arthropoda
- Class: Insecta
- Order: Lepidoptera
- Family: Gracillariidae
- Genus: Acrocercops
- Species: A. diplacopa

Binomial name
- Acrocercops diplacopa Meyrick, 1936

Species of moth

Acrocercops diplacopa is a moth of the family Gracillariidae, known from Java, Indonesia. It was described by Edward Meyrick in 1936. The hostplant for the species is Ficus septica.
