= Acrocercops synclinias =

Scientific classification
- Kingdom: Animalia
- Phylum: Arthropoda
- Class: Insecta
- Order: Lepidoptera
- Family: Gracillariidae
- Genus: Acrocercops
- Species: A. synclinias

Binomial name
- Acrocercops synclinias Meyrick, 1931

Species of moth

Acrocercops synclinias is a moth of the family Gracillariidae. It is known from Indonesia (Java) and Malaysia (West Malaysia).

The larvae feed on Saraca declinata and Saraca thaipingensis. They probably mine the leaves of their host plant.
