= Acrocercops eupetala =

Scientific classification
- Domain: Eukaryota
- Kingdom: Animalia
- Phylum: Arthropoda
- Class: Insecta
- Order: Lepidoptera
- Family: Gracillariidae
- Genus: Acrocercops
- Species: A. eupetala

Binomial name
- Acrocercops eupetala (Meyrick, 1880)

Synonyms
- Gracilaria eupetala Meyrick, 1880

Species of moth

Acrocercops eupetala is a moth of the family Gracillariidae. It is known from New South Wales and Queensland, Australia.

The larvae feed on Acacia decurrens. They probably mine the leaves of their host plant.
