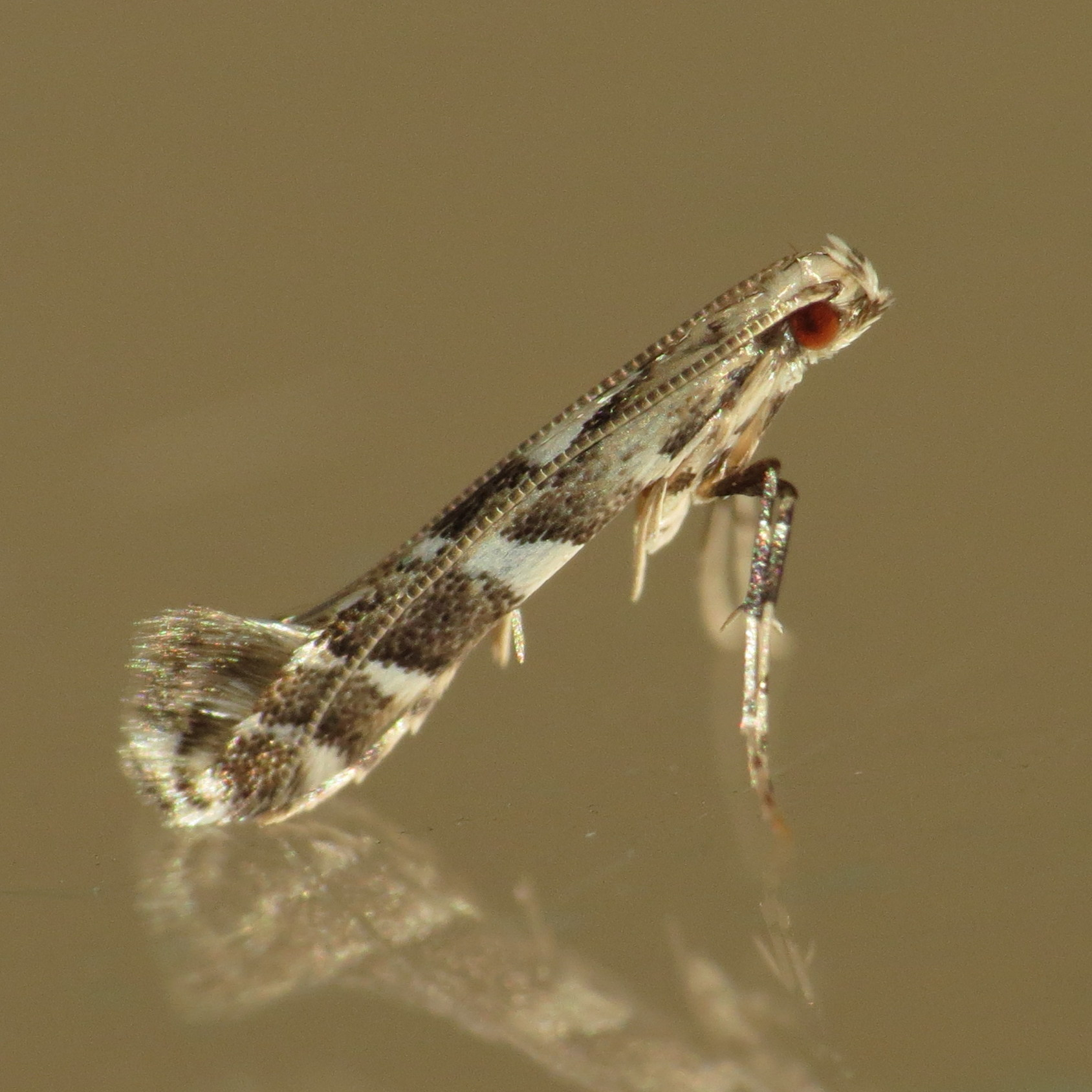
- Acrocercops astericola

Scientific classification
- Kingdom: Animalia
- Phylum: Arthropoda
- Class: Insecta
- Order: Lepidoptera
- Family: Gracillariidae
- Subfamily: Acrocercopinae
- Genus: Acrocercops; Wallengren, 1881

Species
- See text

= Acrocercops =

Genus of moths

Acrocercops is a genus of moths in the family Gracillariidae.

== Species ==
- Acrocercops acanthidias Meyrick, 1934
- Acrocercops achnodes Meyrick, 1915
- Acrocercops aeglophanes (Turner, 1913)
- Acrocercops aellomacha (Meyrick, 1880)
- Acrocercops aeolellum (Meyrick, 1880)
- Acrocercops aethalota (Meyrick, 1880)
- Acrocercops affinis Braun, 1918
- Acrocercops albida Turner, 1947
- Acrocercops albidorsella Bradley, 1957
- Acrocercops albinatella (Chambers, 1872)
- Acrocercops albofasciella Yazaki, 1926
- Acrocercops albomaculella (Turner, 1894)
- Acrocercops albomarginatum (Walsingham, 1897)
- Acrocercops allactopa Meyrick, 1916
- Acrocercops alysidota (Meyrick, 1880)
- Acrocercops amethystopa Meyrick, 1916
- Acrocercops amurensis Kuznetzov, 1960
- Acrocercops angelica Meyrick, 1919
- Acrocercops anthogramma Meyrick, 1921
- Acrocercops anthracuris Meyrick, 1926
- Acrocercops antigrapha Turner, 1926
- Acrocercops antimima Turner, 1940
- Acrocercops apicella Bradley, 1957
- Acrocercops apicepunctella (Walsingham, 1891)
- Acrocercops apoblepta Turner, 1913
- Acrocercops arbutella Braun, 1925
- Acrocercops archepolis (Meyrick, 1907)
- Acrocercops argentigera Diakonoff, 1955
- Acrocercops argocosma Meyrick, 1915
- Acrocercops argodesma Meyrick, 1936
- Acrocercops argyraspis Meyrick, 1908
- Acrocercops argyrodesma (Meyrick, 1883)
- Acrocercops argyrosema Turner, 1947
- Acrocercops asaphogramma Meyrick, 1920
- Acrocercops astericola (Frey & Boll, 1873)
- Acrocercops astiopa Meyrick, 1930
- Acrocercops attenuatum (Walsingham, 1897)
- Acrocercops auricilla (Stainton, 1859)
- Acrocercops autadelpha (Meyrick, 1880)
- Acrocercops autarithma Meyrick, 1934
- Acrocercops axinophora Turner, 1940
- Acrocercops barringtoniella (van Deventer, 1904)
- Acrocercops bifasciata (Walsingham, 1891)
- Acrocercops bifrenis Meyrick, 1918
- Acrocercops bisinuata Meyrick, 1921
- Acrocercops brachyglypta Meyrick, 1931
- Acrocercops breyeri Bourquin, 1962
- Acrocercops brochogramma Meyrick, 1914
- Acrocercops brongniardella (Fabricius, 1798)
- Acrocercops caementosa Meyrick, 1915
- Acrocercops caenotheta (Meyrick, 1880)
- Acrocercops calicella (Stainton, 1862)
- Acrocercops calycophthalma Meyrick, 1926
- Acrocercops camptochrysa Meyrick, 1921
- Acrocercops candida Turner, 1947
- Acrocercops castellata Meyrick, 1908
- Acrocercops chalcea Turner, 1926
- Acrocercops chalceopla (Turner, 1913)
- Acrocercops chalinopa Meyrick, 1920
- Acrocercops chalinosema Meyrick, 1936
- Acrocercops charitopis Meyrick, 1915
- Acrocercops chenopa Meyrick, 1932
- Acrocercops cherimoliae Ghesquière, 1940
- Acrocercops chionoplecta (Meyrick, 1883)
- Acrocercops chionosema Turner, 1940
- Acrocercops chloronympha Meyrick, 1921
- Acrocercops chrysargyra Meyrick, 1908
- Acrocercops chrysometra (Meyrick, 1926)
- Acrocercops chrysophila Meyrick, 1937
- Acrocercops chrysophylli Vári, 1961
- Acrocercops chrysoplitis Meyrick, 1937
- Acrocercops cirrhantha Meyrick, 1915
- Acrocercops cissiella Busck, 1934
- Acrocercops citrodora Meyrick, 1914
- Acrocercops clepsinoma Meyrick, 1916
- Acrocercops clinogramma Meyrick, 1930
- Acrocercops clinozona Meyrick, 1920
- Acrocercops clisiopa Meyrick, 1935
- Acrocercops clisiophora Turner, 1940
- Acrocercops clitoriella Busck, [1934]
- Acrocercops clytosema Meyrick, 1920
- Acrocercops cocciferellum (Chrétien, 1910)
- Acrocercops coffeifoliella (Motschulsky, 1859)
- Acrocercops coloptila Meyrick, 1937
- Acrocercops combreticola Vári, 1961
- Acrocercops contorta Meyrick, 1920
- Acrocercops convoluta Meyrick, 1908
- Acrocercops cordiella Busck, 1934
- Acrocercops cornicina Meyrick, 1908
- Acrocercops crotalistis Meyrick, 1915
- Acrocercops crucigera Meyrick, 1920
- Acrocercops crypsigrapha Meyrick, 1930
- Acrocercops crystallopa Meyrick, 1916
- Acrocercops cyanodeta Meyrick, 1918
- Acrocercops cyclogramma Meyrick, 1921
- Acrocercops cylicota Meyrick, 1914
- Acrocercops cyma Bradley, 1957
- Acrocercops cymella Forbes, 1931
- Acrocercops cyphostacta Meyrick, 1921
- Acrocercops defigurata Meyrick, 1928
- Acrocercops delicata Meyrick, 1921
- Acrocercops demotes Walsingham, 1914
- Acrocercops desmochares Meyrick, 1921
- Acrocercops diacentrota Meyrick, 1935
- Acrocercops diatonica Meyrick, 1916
- Acrocercops didymella (Meyrick, 1880)
- Acrocercops diffluella (van Deventer, 1904)
- Acrocercops dinosticha Meyrick, 1936
- Acrocercops diplacopa Meyrick, 1936
- Acrocercops distylii Kumata & Kuroko, 1988
- Acrocercops doloploca Meyrick, 1921
- Acrocercops encentris Meyrick, 1915
- Acrocercops enchlamyda (Turner, 1894)
- Acrocercops ennychodes Meyrick, 1921
- Acrocercops epiclina Meyrick, 1918
- Acrocercops eranista Meyrick, 1918
- Acrocercops erebopa Meyrick, 1936
- Acrocercops erioplaca Meyrick, 1918
- Acrocercops euargyra Meyrick, 1934
- Acrocercops eugeniella (van Deventer, 1904)
- Acrocercops eupetala (Meyrick, 1880)
- Acrocercops eurhythmopa Meyrick, 1934
- Acrocercops euryschema Turner, 1947
- Acrocercops euthycolona Meyrick, 1931
- Acrocercops extenuata Meyrick, 1916
- Acrocercops fasciculata Meyrick, 1915
- Acrocercops ficina Vári, 1961
- Acrocercops fuscapica Bland, 1980
- Acrocercops galeopa Meyrick, 1908
- Acrocercops gemmans Walsingham, 1914
- Acrocercops geologica Meyrick, 1908
- Acrocercops glutella (van Deventer, 1904)
- Acrocercops goniodesma Meyrick, 1934
- Acrocercops gossypii Vári, 1961
- Acrocercops grammatacma Meyrick, 1921
- Acrocercops guttiferella (Viette, 1951)
- Acrocercops habroscia Meyrick, 1921
- Acrocercops hapalarga Meyrick, 1916
- Acrocercops haplocosma Meyrick, 1936
- Acrocercops hapsidota Meyrick, 1915
- Acrocercops hastigera Meyrick, 1915
- Acrocercops hedymopa Turner, 1913
- Acrocercops helicomitra Meyrick, 1924
- Acrocercops helicopa Meyrick, 1919
- Acrocercops hemiglypta Meyrick, 1916
- Acrocercops heptadrachma Diakonoff, 1955
- Acrocercops heterodoxa Meyrick, 1912
- Acrocercops heteroloba Meyrick, 1932
- Acrocercops hexachorda Meyrick, 1914
- Acrocercops hexaclosta Meyrick, 1934
- Acrocercops hierocosma Meyrick, 1912
- Acrocercops hippuris Meyrick, 1915
- Acrocercops homalacta Meyrick, 1927
- Acrocercops hoplocala (Meyrick, 1880)
- Acrocercops hormista Meyrick, 1916
- Acrocercops hyphantica Meyrick, 1912
- Acrocercops imperfecta Gozmány, 1960
- Acrocercops inconspicua Forbes, 1930
- Acrocercops insulariella Opler, 1971
- Acrocercops insulella (Walsingham, 1891)
- Acrocercops ipomoeae Busck, [1934]
- Acrocercops iraniana Triberti, 1990
- Acrocercops irradians Meyrick, 1931
- Acrocercops irrorata (Turner, 1894)
- Acrocercops isodelta Meyrick, 1908
- Acrocercops isotoma Turner, 1940
- Acrocercops karachiella Amsel, 1968
- Acrocercops laciniella (Meyrick, 1880)
- Acrocercops largoplaga Legrand, 1965
- Acrocercops lenticulata Meyrick, 1922
- Acrocercops leptalea (Turner, 1900)
- Acrocercops leucocyma (Meyrick, 1889)
- Acrocercops leucographa Clarke, 1953
- Acrocercops leucomochla Turner, 1926
- Acrocercops leuconota (Zeller, 1877)
- Acrocercops leucophaea Meyrick, 1919
- Acrocercops leucostega (Meyrick, 1932)
- Acrocercops leucotoma Turner, 1913
- Acrocercops lithochalca Meyrick, 1930
- Acrocercops lithogramma Meyrick, 1920
- Acrocercops lophonota Meyrick, 1921
- Acrocercops loxias Meyrick, 1918
- Acrocercops luctuosa Meyrick, 1915
- Acrocercops lyrica Meyrick, 1908
- Acrocercops lysibathra Meyrick, 1916
- Acrocercops macaria Turner, 1913
- Acrocercops macrochalca Meyrick, 1910
- Acrocercops macroclina Meyrick, 1916
- Acrocercops macroplaca Meyrick, 1908
- Acrocercops malvacea Walsingham, 1907
- Acrocercops mantica Meyrick, 1908
- Acrocercops maranthaceae Busck, 1934
- Acrocercops marmarauges Meyrick, 1936
- Acrocercops marmaritis Walsingham, 1914
- Acrocercops martaella Legrand, 1965
- Acrocercops mechanopla Meyrick, 1934
- Acrocercops melanocosma Meyrick, 1920
- Acrocercops melanoplecta Meyrick, 1908
- Acrocercops melantherella Busck, 1934
- Acrocercops mendosa Meyrick, 1912
- Acrocercops mesochaeta Meyrick, 1920
- Acrocercops microphis Meyrick, 1921
- Acrocercops myriogramma Meyrick, 1937
- Acrocercops nebropa Meyrick, 1927
- Acrocercops nereis (Meyrick, 1880)
- Acrocercops niphocremna Meyrick, 1932
- Acrocercops nitidula (Stainton, 1862)
- Acrocercops nolckeniella (Zeller, 1877)
- Acrocercops obscurella (Turner, 1894)
- Acrocercops obversa Meyrick, 1915
- Acrocercops ochnifolii Vári, 1961
- Acrocercops ochrocephala (Meyrick, 1880)
- Acrocercops ochronephela Meyrick, 1908
- Acrocercops ochroptila Turner, 1913
- Acrocercops ophiodes (Turner, 1896)
- Acrocercops orbifera Meyrick, 1908
- Acrocercops orianassa Meyrick, 1932
- Acrocercops ornata (Walsingham, 1897)
- Acrocercops ortholocha Meyrick, 1908
- Acrocercops orthostacta Meyrick, 1918
- Acrocercops osteopa Meyrick, 1920
- Acrocercops paliacma Meyrick, 1930
- Acrocercops panacicorticis (Watt, 1920)
- Acrocercops panacifinens (Watt, 1920)
- Acrocercops panacitorsens (Watt, 1920)
- Acrocercops panacivagans (Watt, 1920)
- Acrocercops panacivermiforma (Watt, 1920)
- Acrocercops parallela (Turner, 1894)
- Acrocercops patellata Meyrick, 1921
- Acrocercops patricia Meyrick, 1908
- Acrocercops pectinivalva Bland, 1980
- Acrocercops penographa Meyrick, 1920
- Acrocercops pentacycla Meyrick, 1934
- Acrocercops pentalocha Meyrick, 1912
- Acrocercops pertenuis Turner, 1923
- Acrocercops perturbata Meyrick, 1921
- Acrocercops petalopa Meyrick, 1934
- Acrocercops phaeodeta Meyrick, 1927
- Acrocercops phaeomorpha Meyrick, 1919
- Acrocercops phaeospora Meyrick, 1916
- Acrocercops pharopeda Meyrick, 1916
- Acrocercops piligera Meyrick, 1915
- Acrocercops plebeia (Turner, 1894)
- Acrocercops plectospila Meyrick, 1921
- Acrocercops plocamis Meyrick, 1908
- Acrocercops pnosmodiella (Busck, 1902)
- Acrocercops poliocephala Turner, 1913
- Acrocercops polyclasta Meyrick, 1919
- Acrocercops pontifica Forbes, 1931
- Acrocercops praeclusa Meyrick, 1914
- Acrocercops praesecta Meyrick, 1922
- Acrocercops prompta Meyrick, 1916
- Acrocercops prospera Meyrick, 1920
- Acrocercops psaliodes Meyrick, 1926
- Acrocercops punctulata (Walsingham, 1891)
- Acrocercops pylonias Meyrick, 1921
- Acrocercops pyrigenes (Turner, 1896)
- Acrocercops quadrisecta Meyrick, 1932
- Acrocercops querci Kumata & Kuroko, 1988
- Acrocercops quinquistrigella (Chambers, 1875)
- Acrocercops ramigera Meyrick, 1920
- Acrocercops retrogressa Meyrick, 1921
- Acrocercops rhodospira Meyrick, 1939
- Acrocercops rhombiferellum (Frey & Boll, 1876)
- Acrocercops rhombocosma Meyrick, 1911
- Acrocercops rhothiastis Meyrick, 1921
- Acrocercops rhothogramma T. B. Fletcher, 1933
- Acrocercops rhynchograpta Meyrick, 1920
- Acrocercops sarcocrossa Meyrick, 1924
- Acrocercops sauropis Meyrick, 1908
- Acrocercops scandalota Meyrick, 1914
- Acrocercops scenias Meyrick, 1914
- Acrocercops scoliograpta Meyrick, 1922
- Acrocercops scriptulata Meyrick, 1916
- Acrocercops selmatica Meyrick, 1918
- Acrocercops serriformis Meyrick, 1930
- Acrocercops serrigera Meyrick, 1915
- Acrocercops siphonaula Meyrick, 1931
- Acrocercops soritis Meyrick, 1915
- Acrocercops sphaerodelta Meyrick, 1935
- Acrocercops spodophylla Turner, 1913
- Acrocercops sporograpta Meyrick, 1932
- Acrocercops stalagmitis Meyrick, 1915
- Acrocercops stereomita Turner, 1913
- Acrocercops stricta Meyrick, 1908
- Acrocercops strigosa Braun, 1914
- Acrocercops strophala Meyrick, 1908
- Acrocercops strophiaula Meyrick, 1935
- Acrocercops supplex Meyrick, 1918
- Acrocercops symbolopis Meyrick, 1936
- Acrocercops symmetropa Meyrick, 1939
- Acrocercops symploca Turner, 1913
- Acrocercops synclinias Meyrick, 1931
- Acrocercops syzygiena Vári, 1961
- Acrocercops tacita Triberti, 2001
- Acrocercops taeniarcha Meyrick, 1932
- Acrocercops telearcha Meyrick, 1908
- Acrocercops telestis Meyrick, 1911
- Acrocercops tenera Meyrick, 1914
- Acrocercops terminaliae (Stainton, 1862)
- Acrocercops terminalina Vári, 1961
- Acrocercops tetrachorda Turner, 1913
- Acrocercops tetracrena Meyrick, 1908
- Acrocercops tetradeta Meyrick, 1926
- Acrocercops theaeformisella Viette, 1955
- Acrocercops thrylodes Meyrick, 1930
- Acrocercops thylacaula Meyrick, 1932
- Acrocercops tomia Bradley, 1956
- Acrocercops transecta Meyrick, 1931
- Acrocercops trapezoides (Turner, 1894)
- Acrocercops triacris Meyrick, 1908
- Acrocercops tricalyx Meyrick, 1921
- Acrocercops tricirrha Meyrick, 1935
- Acrocercops tricyma Meyrick, 1908
- Acrocercops tripolis Meyrick, 1921
- Acrocercops triscalma Meyrick, 1916
- Acrocercops trisigillata Meyrick, 1921
- Acrocercops trissoptila Meyrick, 1921
- Acrocercops tristaniae (Turner, 1894)
- Acrocercops undifraga Meyrick, 1931
- Acrocercops unilineata (Turner, 1894)
- Acrocercops unipuncta Bradley, 1957
- Acrocercops unistriata Yuan, 1986
- Acrocercops urbanella (Zeller, 1877)
- Acrocercops ustulatella (Stainton, 1859)
- Acrocercops vallata Kumata & Kuroko, 1988
- Acrocercops vanula Meyrick, 1912
- Acrocercops viatica Meyrick, 1916
- Acrocercops walsinghami Rebel, 1907
- Acrocercops xeniella (Zeller, 1877)
- Acrocercops xystrota Meyrick, 1915
- Acrocercops zadocaea Meyrick, 1912
- Acrocercops zamenopa Meyrick, 1934
- Acrocercops zebrulella Forbes, 1931
- Acrocercops zopherandra Meyrick, 1931
- Acrocercops zorionella (Hudson, 1918)
- Acrocercops zygonoma Meyrick, 1921
