= Acrocercops niphocremna =

Scientific classification
- Kingdom: Animalia
- Phylum: Arthropoda
- Class: Insecta
- Order: Lepidoptera
- Family: Gracillariidae
- Genus: Acrocercops
- Species: A. niphocremna

Binomial name
- Acrocercops niphocremna Meyrick, 1932

Species of moth

Acrocercops niphocremna is a moth of the family Gracillariidae, known from Maharashtra, India. It was described by Edward Meyrick in 1932. The hostplant for the species is Terminalia chebula.

Acrocercops is a genus of moths in the family Gracillariidae.
