= Acrocercops sarcocrossa =

Scientific classification
- Kingdom: Animalia
- Phylum: Arthropoda
- Class: Insecta
- Order: Lepidoptera
- Family: Gracillariidae
- Genus: Acrocercops
- Species: A. sarcocrossa

Binomial name
- Acrocercops sarcocrossa Meyrick, 1924

Species of moth

Acrocercops sarcocrossa is a moth of the family Gracillariidae. It is known from Fiji.

The larvae feed on Calophyllum species. They probably mine the leaves of their host plant.
