= Acrocercops tetradeta =

Scientific classification
- Domain: Eukaryota
- Kingdom: Animalia
- Phylum: Arthropoda
- Class: Insecta
- Order: Lepidoptera
- Family: Gracillariidae
- Genus: Acrocercops
- Species: A. tetradeta

Binomial name
- Acrocercops tetradeta Meyrick, 1926

Species of moth

Acrocercops tetradeta is a moth of the family Gracillariidae. It is known from Singapore and India (Karnataka and Maharashtra).

The larvae feed on Ixora coccinea. They probably mine the leaves of their host plant.
