= Acrocercops scenias =

Scientific classification
- Kingdom: Animalia
- Phylum: Arthropoda
- Class: Insecta
- Order: Lepidoptera
- Family: Gracillariidae
- Genus: Acrocercops
- Species: A. scenias

Binomial name
- Acrocercops scenias Meyrick, 1914

Species of moth

Acrocercops scenias is a moth of the family Gracillariidae. It is known from India (Karnataka).

The larvae feed on Changana bush.
