= Acrocercops candida =

Scientific classification
- Kingdom: Animalia
- Phylum: Arthropoda
- Class: Insecta
- Order: Lepidoptera
- Family: Gracillariidae
- Genus: Acrocercops
- Species: A. candida

Binomial name
- Acrocercops candida Turner, 1947

Species of moth

Acrocercops candida is a moth of the family Gracillariidae. It is known from Queensland, Australia.
