= Acrocercops leuconota =

Scientific classification
- Kingdom: Animalia
- Phylum: Arthropoda
- Clade: Pancrustacea
- Class: Insecta
- Order: Lepidoptera
- Family: Gracillariidae
- Genus: Acrocercops
- Species: A. leuconota

Binomial name
- Acrocercops leuconota (Zeller, 1877)

Species of moth

Acrocercops leuconota is a moth of the family Gracillariidae, known from Colombia. It was described by P.C. Zeller in 1877.
