= Acrocercops scoliograpta =

Scientific classification
- Kingdom: Animalia
- Phylum: Arthropoda
- Class: Insecta
- Order: Lepidoptera
- Family: Gracillariidae
- Genus: Acrocercops
- Species: A. scoliograpta

Binomial name
- Acrocercops scoliograpta Meyrick, 1922

Species of moth

Acrocercops scoliograpta is a moth of the family Gracillariidae. It is known from India (Punjab).
