= Acrocercops psaliodes =

Scientific classification
- Domain: Eukaryota
- Kingdom: Animalia
- Phylum: Arthropoda
- Class: Insecta
- Order: Lepidoptera
- Family: Gracillariidae
- Genus: Acrocercops
- Species: A. psaliodes

Binomial name
- Acrocercops psaliodes Meyrick, 1926

Species of moth

Acrocercops psaliodes is a moth of the family Gracillariidae. It is known from India (Karnataka and Maharashtra).

The larvae feed on Bridelia species. They mine the leaves of their host plant.
