= Acrocercops ochnifolii =

Scientific classification
- Kingdom: Animalia
- Phylum: Arthropoda
- Class: Insecta
- Order: Lepidoptera
- Family: Gracillariidae
- Genus: Acrocercops
- Species: A. ochnifolii

Binomial name
- Acrocercops ochnifolii Vári, 1961

Species of moth

Acrocercops ochnifolii is a moth of the family Gracillariidae. It is known from South Africa.

The larvae feed on Ochna natalitia. They mine the leaves of their host plant.
