= Acrocercops autadelpha =

Scientific classification
- Kingdom: Animalia
- Phylum: Arthropoda
- Clade: Pancrustacea
- Class: Insecta
- Order: Lepidoptera
- Family: Gracillariidae
- Genus: Acrocercops
- Species: A. autadelpha

Binomial name
- Acrocercops autadelpha (Meyrick, 1880)

Synonyms
- Gracilaria autadelpha Meyrick, 1880; Acrocercops symphyletes Turner, 1913

Species of moth

Acrocercops autadelpha is a moth of the family Gracillariidae. It is known from New South Wales and Queensland, Australia.

The wingspan is about 8 mm.

The larvae feed on Banksia species.
