= Acrocercops defigurata =

Scientific classification
- Kingdom: Animalia
- Phylum: Arthropoda
- Class: Insecta
- Order: Lepidoptera
- Family: Gracillariidae
- Genus: Acrocercops
- Species: A. defigurata

Binomial name
- Acrocercops defigurata Meyrick, 1928

Species of moth

Acrocercops defigurata is a moth of the family Gracillariidae, known from Assam, India, as well as Nepal. It was described by Edward Meyrick in 1928. The hostplant for the species is Juglans regia.
