= Acrocercops selmatica =

Scientific classification
- Domain: Eukaryota
- Kingdom: Animalia
- Phylum: Arthropoda
- Class: Insecta
- Order: Lepidoptera
- Family: Gracillariidae
- Genus: Acrocercops
- Species: A. selmatica

Binomial name
- Acrocercops selmatica Meyrick, 1918

Species of moth

Acrocercops selmatica is a moth of the family Gracillariidae. It is known from India (Assam).
