= Acrocercops nebropa =

Scientific classification
- Domain: Eukaryota
- Kingdom: Animalia
- Phylum: Arthropoda
- Class: Insecta
- Order: Lepidoptera
- Family: Gracillariidae
- Genus: Acrocercops
- Species: A. nebropa

Binomial name
- Acrocercops nebropa Meyrick, 1927

Species of insect

Acrocercops nebropa is a moth of the family Gracillariidae, known from Samoa. It was described by Edward Meyrick in 1932.
