= Acrocercops lophonota =

Scientific classification
- Kingdom: Animalia
- Phylum: Arthropoda
- Clade: Pancrustacea
- Class: Insecta
- Order: Lepidoptera
- Family: Gracillariidae
- Genus: Acrocercops
- Species: A. lophonota

Binomial name
- Acrocercops lophonota Meyrick, 1921

Species of moth

Acrocercops lophonota is a moth of the family Gracillariidae. It is known from Java, Indonesia.

== Original description ==
Wingspan 10–11 mm. Head and thorax rather dark fuscous, pale-speckled, face whitish. Palpi with second joint rough-scaled towards apex anteriorly, dark fuscous, apex whitish, terminal joint rather rough anteriorly, whitish with three dark fuscous rings. Basal joint of antennae with narrow but strong pecten at base. Abdomen dark grey, beneath and on sides whitish, with lateral series of oblique dark fuscous bars. Forewings very narrow, obtuse; rather dark fuscous, pale-speckled; an obscure transverse whitish line almost at base; white transverse lines converging towards costa before and beyond 1/3, accompanied above by yellowish lines, similar more oblique pairs of lines meeting on costa beyond middle; between these are two darker fuscous suboval spots resting on costa partially edged by similar lines, and a third larger subtriangular blotch on costa about 2/3, some irregular light yellowish angulated markings beyond this; an obtusely angulated transverse bluish-silvery line towards apex, followed on costa by a yellowish mark and white dot; a large projecting tuft of dark fuscous scales from dorsum before middle, a smaller one beyond middle, and a third in cilia before tornus: cilia grey, at apex a dark fuscous hook. Hindwings dark grey; cilia grey. Forewings beneath in male with expansible pencil of ochreous-whitish hairs from base of costa reaching to 1/3 of wing. Java, Batavia; two specimens. Nearly allied to auricilla, which has similar dorsal tufts, but distinct; the apical area of wing in Acrocercops auricilla is pale ochreous-yellowish, and the pale lines are more obscure, not yellowish, and rather differently arranged, the costal spots blackish, the male has a subcostal hairpencil beneath, but it is much shorter.
