= Acrocercops ophiodes =

Scientific classification
- Domain: Eukaryota
- Kingdom: Animalia
- Phylum: Arthropoda
- Class: Insecta
- Order: Lepidoptera
- Family: Gracillariidae
- Genus: Acrocercops
- Species: A. ophiodes

Binomial name
- Acrocercops ophiodes (Turner, 1896)

Synonyms
- Gracilaria ophiodes Turner, 1896

Species of moth

Acrocercops ophiodes is a moth of the family Gracillariidae. It is known from Queensland and New South Wales, Australia.
