= Acrocercops argodesma =

Scientific classification
- Domain: Eukaryota
- Kingdom: Animalia
- Phylum: Arthropoda
- Class: Insecta
- Order: Lepidoptera
- Family: Gracillariidae
- Genus: Acrocercops
- Species: A. argodesma

Binomial name
- Acrocercops argodesma Meyrick, 1936

Species of moth

Acrocercops argodesma is a moth of the family Gracillariidae, known from Java, Indonesia. The hostplant for the species is Eugenia cumini.
