= Acrocercops citrodora =

Scientific classification
- Kingdom: Animalia
- Phylum: Arthropoda
- Class: Insecta
- Order: Lepidoptera
- Family: Gracillariidae
- Genus: Acrocercops
- Species: A. citrodora

Binomial name
- Acrocercops citrodora Meyrick, 1914

Species of moth

Acrocercops citrodora is a moth of the family Gracillariidae, known from Karnataka, India. It was described by Edward Meyrick in 1914.
