= Acrocercops punctulata =

Scientific classification
- Domain: Eukaryota
- Kingdom: Animalia
- Phylum: Arthropoda
- Class: Insecta
- Order: Lepidoptera
- Family: Gracillariidae
- Genus: Acrocercops
- Species: A. punctulata

Binomial name
- Acrocercops punctulata (Walsingham, 1891)

Synonyms
- Gracilaria punctulata Walsingham, 1891

Species of moth

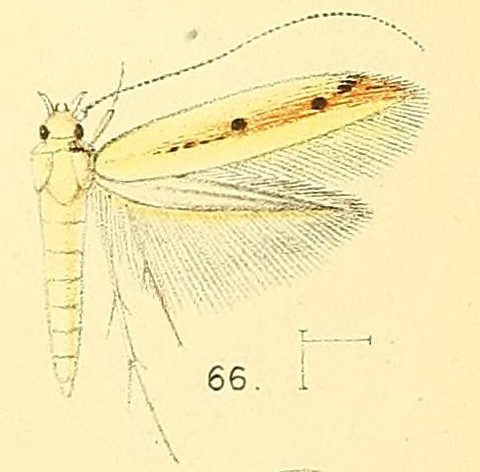
Acrocercops punctulata

Acrocercops punctulata is a moth of the family Gracillariidae. It is known from South Africa.
