= Acrocercops polyclasta =

Scientific classification
- Domain: Eukaryota
- Kingdom: Animalia
- Phylum: Arthropoda
- Class: Insecta
- Order: Lepidoptera
- Family: Gracillariidae
- Genus: Acrocercops
- Species: A. polyclasta

Binomial name
- Acrocercops polyclasta Meyrick, 1919

Species of moth

Acrocercops polyclasta is a moth of the family Gracillariidae, known from Uttarakhand, India. It was described by Edward Meyrick in 1919.
