= Acrocercops cherimoliae =

Scientific classification
- Kingdom: Animalia
- Phylum: Arthropoda
- Class: Insecta
- Order: Lepidoptera
- Family: Gracillariidae
- Genus: Acrocercops
- Species: A. cherimoliae

Binomial name
- Acrocercops cherimoliae Ghesquière, 1940

Species of moth

Acrocercops cherimoliae is a moth of the family Gracillariidae. It is known from the Democratic Republic of Congo.

The larvae feed on Annona cherimolia. They probably mine the leaves of their host plant.
