= Acrocercops karachiella =

Scientific classification
- Domain: Eukaryota
- Kingdom: Animalia
- Phylum: Arthropoda
- Class: Insecta
- Order: Lepidoptera
- Family: Gracillariidae
- Genus: Acrocercops
- Species: A. karachiella

Binomial name
- Acrocercops karachiella Amsel, 1968

Species of moth

Acrocercops karachiella is a moth of the family Gracillariidae, known from Pakistan. It was described by H.G. Amsel in 1968.
