= Acrocercops leucostega =

Scientific classification
- Kingdom: Animalia
- Phylum: Arthropoda
- Class: Insecta
- Order: Lepidoptera
- Family: Gracillariidae
- Genus: Acrocercops
- Species: A. leucostega

Binomial name
- Acrocercops leucostega (Meyrick, 1932)

Synonyms
- Tinea timaea Meyrick, 1932

Species of moth

Acrocercops leucostega is a moth of the family Gracillariidae. It is known from Sierra Leone.
