= Acrocercops heptadrachma =

Scientific classification
- Domain: Eukaryota
- Kingdom: Animalia
- Phylum: Arthropoda
- Class: Insecta
- Order: Lepidoptera
- Family: Gracillariidae
- Genus: Acrocercops
- Species: A. heptadrachma

Binomial name
- Acrocercops heptadrachma Diakonoff, 1955

Species of moth

Acrocercops heptadrachma is a moth of the family Gracillariidae, known from Papua New Guinea. It was described by A. Diakonoff in 1955.
