= Acrocercops sauropis =

Scientific classification
- Domain: Eukaryota
- Kingdom: Animalia
- Phylum: Arthropoda
- Class: Insecta
- Order: Lepidoptera
- Family: Gracillariidae
- Genus: Acrocercops
- Species: A. sauropis

Binomial name
- Acrocercops sauropis Meyrick, 1908

Species of moth

Acrocercops sauropis is a moth of the family Gracillariidae. It is known from India (Meghalaya).
