= Acrocercops clinogramma =

Scientific classification
- Kingdom: Animalia
- Phylum: Arthropoda
- Class: Insecta
- Order: Lepidoptera
- Family: Gracillariidae
- Genus: Acrocercops
- Species: A. clinogramma

Binomial name
- Acrocercops clinogramma Meyrick, 1930

Species of moth

Acrocercops clinogramma is a moth of the family Gracillariidae, known from Vietnam. It was described by Edward Meyrick in 1930.
