= Acrocercops petalopa =

Scientific classification
- Kingdom: Animalia
- Phylum: Arthropoda
- Class: Insecta
- Order: Lepidoptera
- Family: Gracillariidae
- Genus: Acrocercops
- Species: A. petalopa

Binomial name
- Acrocercops petalopa Meyrick, 1934

Species of moth

Acrocercops petalopa is a moth of the family Gracillariidae, known from Maharashtra, India. It was described by Edward Meyrick in 1934. The hostplant for the species is Anogeissus latifolia.
