= Acrocercops acanthidias =

Scientific classification
- Kingdom: Animalia
- Phylum: Arthropoda
- Class: Insecta
- Order: Lepidoptera
- Family: Gracillariidae
- Genus: Acrocercops
- Species: A. acanthidias

Binomial name
- Acrocercops acanthidias Meyrick, 1934

Species of moth

Acrocercops acanthidias is a moth of the family Gracillariidae, known from Java, Indonesia. The host plants for the species include Erioglossum edule and Lepisanthes rubiginosum.
