= Acrocercops macroplaca =

Scientific classification
- Domain: Eukaryota
- Kingdom: Animalia
- Phylum: Arthropoda
- Class: Insecta
- Order: Lepidoptera
- Family: Gracillariidae
- Genus: Acrocercops
- Species: A. macroplaca

Binomial name
- Acrocercops macroplaca Meyrick, 1908

Species of moth

Acrocercops macroplaca is a moth of the family Gracillariidae, known from Meghalaya, India. It was described by Edward Meyrick in 1915.
