= Acrocercops helicopa =

Scientific classification
- Domain: Eukaryota
- Kingdom: Animalia
- Phylum: Arthropoda
- Class: Insecta
- Order: Lepidoptera
- Family: Gracillariidae
- Genus: Acrocercops
- Species: A. helicopa

Binomial name
- Acrocercops helicopa Meyrick, 1919

Species of moth

Acrocercops helicopa is a moth of the family Gracillariidae. It is known from India (Uttaranchal). It was described by Edward Meyrick in 1919.
