= Acrocercops imperfecta =

Scientific classification
- Kingdom: Animalia
- Phylum: Arthropoda
- Clade: Pancrustacea
- Class: Insecta
- Order: Lepidoptera
- Family: Gracillariidae
- Genus: Acrocercops
- Species: A. imperfecta

Binomial name
- Acrocercops imperfecta Gozmány, 1960

Species of moth

Acrocercops imperfecta is a moth of the family Gracillariidae. It is known from Egypt.
