= Acrocercops aeglophanes =

Scientific classification
- Kingdom: Animalia
- Phylum: Arthropoda
- Clade: Pancrustacea
- Class: Insecta
- Order: Lepidoptera
- Family: Gracillariidae
- Genus: Acrocercops
- Species: A. aeglophanes

Binomial name
- Acrocercops aeglophanes Turner, 1913

Species of moth

Acrocercops aeglophanes is a moth of the family Gracillariidae. It is known from Queensland.
