= Acrocercops lenticulata =

Scientific classification
- Kingdom: Animalia
- Phylum: Arthropoda
- Class: Insecta
- Order: Lepidoptera
- Family: Gracillariidae
- Genus: Acrocercops
- Species: A. lenticulata

Binomial name
- Acrocercops lenticulata Meyrick, 1922

Species of moth

Acrocercops lenticulata is a moth of the family Gracillariidae, known from Meghalaya and Assam, India. It was described by Edward Meyrick in 1922.
