= Acrocercops enchlamyda =

Scientific classification
- Domain: Eukaryota
- Kingdom: Animalia
- Phylum: Arthropoda
- Class: Insecta
- Order: Lepidoptera
- Family: Gracillariidae
- Genus: Acrocercops
- Species: A. enchlamyda

Binomial name
- Acrocercops enchlamyda (Turner, 1894)

Synonyms
- Gracilaria enchlamyda Turner, 1894; Gracilaria euchlamyda Turner, 1896

Species of moth

Acrocercops enchlamyda is a moth of the family Gracillariidae. It is known from Queensland, Australia.
