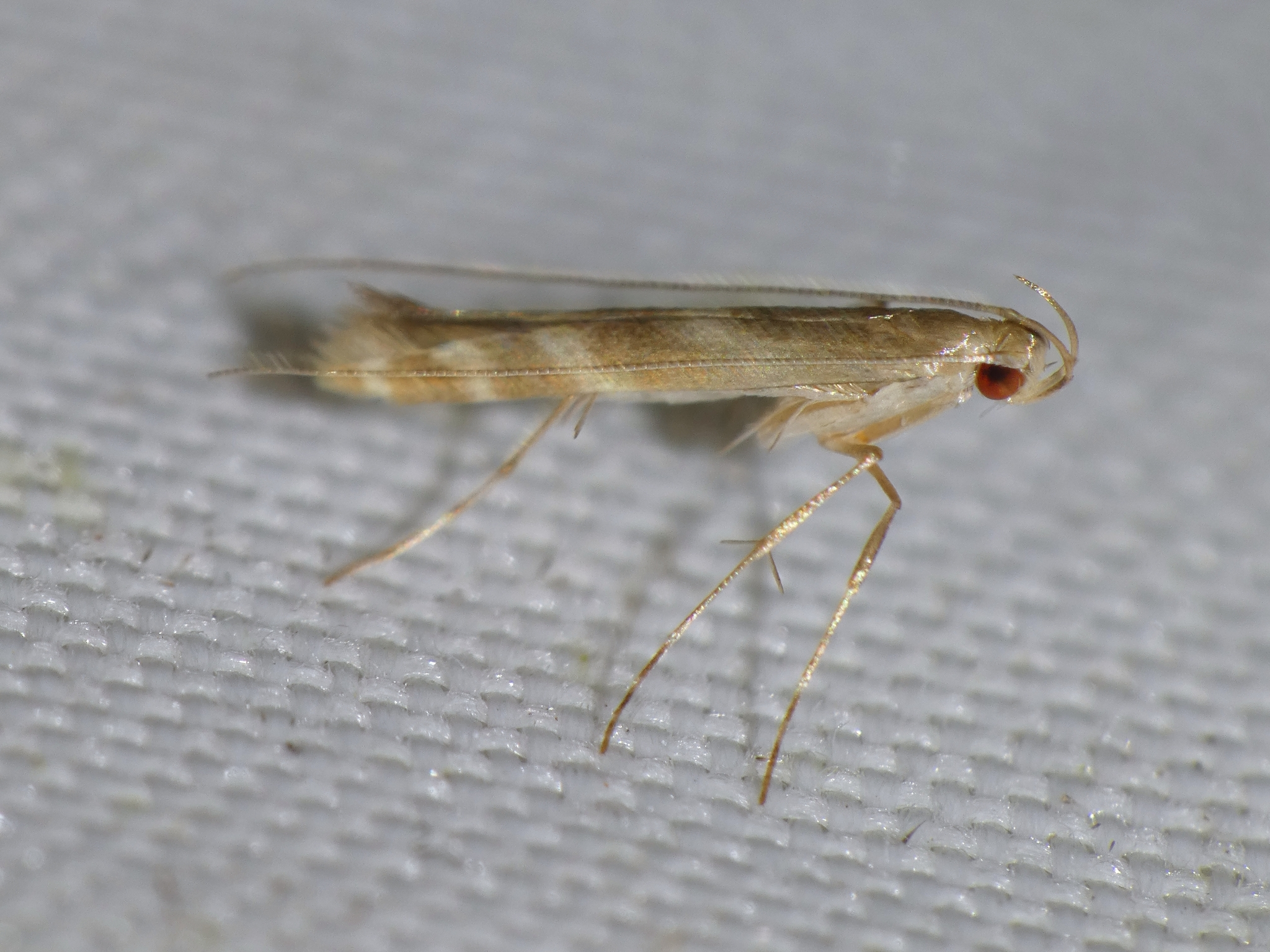

Scientific classification
- Kingdom: Animalia
- Phylum: Arthropoda
- Clade: Pancrustacea
- Class: Insecta
- Order: Lepidoptera
- Family: Gracillariidae
- Genus: Acrocercops
- Species: A. ochroptila

Binomial name
- Acrocercops ochroptila Turner, 1913

= Acrocercops ochroptila =

Species of moth

Acrocercops ochroptila is a species of moth in the family Gracillariidae. It is known from Queensland and the Northern Territory, Australia.

The larvae feed on Terminalia catappa. They probably mine the leaves of their host plant.
