= Acrocercops insulella =

Scientific classification
- Domain: Eukaryota
- Kingdom: Animalia
- Phylum: Arthropoda
- Class: Insecta
- Order: Lepidoptera
- Family: Gracillariidae
- Genus: Acrocercops
- Species: A. insulella

Binomial name
- Acrocercops insulella (Walsingham, 1891)

Species of moth

Acrocercops insulella is a moth of the family Gracillariidae, known from Saint Vincent and the Grenadines and the Dominican Republic. It was described by Walsingham, Lord Thomas de Grey in 1891.
