= Acrocercops prompta =

Scientific classification
- Domain: Eukaryota
- Kingdom: Animalia
- Phylum: Arthropoda
- Class: Insecta
- Order: Lepidoptera
- Family: Gracillariidae
- Genus: Acrocercops
- Species: A. prompta

Binomial name
- Acrocercops prompta Meyrick, 1916

Species of moth

Acrocercops prompta is a moth of the family Gracillariidae, known from Tamil Nadu, India. It was described by Edward Meyrick in 1916.
