= Acrocercops bisinuata =

Scientific classification
- Domain: Eukaryota
- Kingdom: Animalia
- Phylum: Arthropoda
- Class: Insecta
- Order: Lepidoptera
- Family: Gracillariidae
- Genus: Acrocercops
- Species: A. bisinuata

Binomial name
- Acrocercops bisinuata Meyrick, 1921

Species of moth

Acrocercops bisinuata is a moth of the family Gracillariidae, known from Sri Lanka and India. The hostplant for the species is Eugenia malaccensis.
