= Acrocercops brachyglypta =

Scientific classification
- Kingdom: Animalia
- Phylum: Arthropoda
- Class: Insecta
- Order: Lepidoptera
- Family: Gracillariidae
- Genus: Acrocercops
- Species: A. brachyglypta

Binomial name
- Acrocercops brachyglypta Meyrick, 1931

Species of moth

Acrocercops brachyglypta is a moth of the family Gracillariidae, known from Java, Indonesia, as well as Samoa and the Solomon Islands. It was described by E. Meyrick in 1931.
