= Acrocercops archepolis =

Scientific classification
- Kingdom: Animalia
- Phylum: Arthropoda
- Class: Insecta
- Order: Lepidoptera
- Family: Gracillariidae
- Genus: Acrocercops
- Species: A. archepolis

Binomial name
- Acrocercops archepolis (Meyrick, 1907)

Synonyms
- Conopomorpha archepolis Turner, 1894

Species of moth

Acrocercops archepolis is a moth of the family Gracillariidae. It is known from South Australia.
