= Acrocercops sphaerodelta =

Scientific classification
- Kingdom: Animalia
- Phylum: Arthropoda
- Class: Insecta
- Order: Lepidoptera
- Family: Gracillariidae
- Genus: Acrocercops
- Species: A. sphaerodelta

Binomial name
- Acrocercops sphaerodelta Meyrick, 1935

Species of moth

Acrocercops sphaerodelta is a moth of the family Gracillariidae. It is known from Indonesia (Java).

The larvae feed on Eugenia species, including Eugenia cumini. They probably mine the leaves of their host plant.
