= Acrocercops melanocosma =

Scientific classification
- Domain: Eukaryota
- Kingdom: Animalia
- Phylum: Arthropoda
- Class: Insecta
- Order: Lepidoptera
- Family: Gracillariidae
- Genus: Acrocercops
- Species: A. melanocosma

Binomial name
- Acrocercops melanocosma Meyrick, 1920

Species of moth

Acrocercops melanocosma is a moth of the family Gracillariidae, known from Brazil. It was described by Edward Meyrick in 1920.
