= Acrocercops plectospila =

Scientific classification
- Domain: Eukaryota
- Kingdom: Animalia
- Phylum: Arthropoda
- Class: Insecta
- Order: Lepidoptera
- Family: Gracillariidae
- Genus: Acrocercops
- Species: A. plectospila

Binomial name
- Acrocercops plectospila Meyrick, 1921

Species of moth

Acrocercops plectospila is a moth of the family Gracillariidae. It is known from Queensland, Australia.
