= Acrocercops taeniarcha =

Scientific classification
- Kingdom: Animalia
- Phylum: Arthropoda
- Class: Insecta
- Order: Lepidoptera
- Family: Gracillariidae
- Genus: Acrocercops
- Species: A. taeniarcha

Binomial name
- Acrocercops taeniarcha Meyrick, 1932

Species of moth

Acrocercops taeniarcha is a moth of the family Gracillariidae. It is found in Brazil.
