= Acrocercops albofasciella =

Scientific classification
- Kingdom: Animalia
- Phylum: Arthropoda
- Clade: Pancrustacea
- Class: Insecta
- Order: Lepidoptera
- Family: Gracillariidae
- Genus: Acrocercops
- Species: A. albofasciella

Binomial name
- Acrocercops albofasciella Yazaki, 1926

Species of moth

Acrocercops albofasciella is a moth of the family Gracillariidae. It is known from Japan (Kyūshū, Honshū).

The wingspan is about 7.5 mm.

The larvae feed on Ficus species. They probably mine the leaves of their host plant.
