= Acrocercops geologica =

Scientific classification
- Kingdom: Animalia
- Phylum: Arthropoda
- Clade: Pancrustacea
- Class: Insecta
- Order: Lepidoptera
- Family: Gracillariidae
- Genus: Acrocercops
- Species: A. geologica

Binomial name
- Acrocercops geologica Meyrick, 1908

Species of moth

Acrocercops geologica is a moth of the family Gracillariidae, known from Sri Lanka. It was described by Edward Meyrick in 1908.
