= Acrocercops clytosema =

Scientific classification
- Domain: Eukaryota
- Kingdom: Animalia
- Phylum: Arthropoda
- Class: Insecta
- Order: Lepidoptera
- Family: Gracillariidae
- Genus: Acrocercops
- Species: A. clytosema

Binomial name
- Acrocercops clytosema Meyrick, 1920

Species of moth

Acrocercops clytosema is a moth of the family Gracillariidae, known from Brazil. It was described by Edward Meyrick in 1920.
