= Acrocercops cyphostacta =

Scientific classification
- Kingdom: Animalia
- Phylum: Arthropoda
- Class: Insecta
- Order: Lepidoptera
- Family: Gracillariidae
- Genus: Acrocercops
- Species: A. cyphostacta

Binomial name
- Acrocercops cyphostacta Meyrick, 1921

Species of moth

Acrocercops cyphostacta is a moth of the family Gracillariidae. It is known from Indonesia (Java).

== Original description ==
Wingspan 6 mm. Head white. Palpi smooth, white, with dark fuscous rings at apex of second joint and above middle of terminal. Thorax white, shoulders with a brown spot. Abdomen greyish, beneath white, sides with oblique dark fuscous marks. Forewings very narrow, moderately pointed, acute; ochreous-brown; four white fasciae slightly sprinkled with black specks and edged with black irroration, first at 1/3, moderate, oblique, rather curved, connected with base by a fine white dorsal streak, second beyond middle, narrower, rather oblique, third at 3 /4, narrow, expanded on costa, interrupted in middle with black irroration to form two small spots, fourth praeapical, slender, partially interrupted by black scales: cilia whitish-grey, round apex whitish with blackish subbasal line. Hindwings grey; cilia light grey. Java, Pekalongan (van Deventer); one specimen. Nearest to Acrocercops orthostatic.
