= Acrocercops symbolopis =

Scientific classification
- Kingdom: Animalia
- Phylum: Arthropoda
- Clade: Pancrustacea
- Class: Insecta
- Order: Lepidoptera
- Family: Gracillariidae
- Genus: Acrocercops
- Species: A. symbolopis

Binomial name
- Acrocercops symbolopis Meyrick, 1936

Species of moth

Acrocercops symbolopis is a moth of the family Gracillariidae. It is known from India and Thailand.

The larvae feed on Achras sapota and Manilkara zapota. They probably mine the leaves of their host plant.
