= Acrocercops leptalea =

Scientific classification
- Kingdom: Animalia
- Phylum: Arthropoda
- Class: Insecta
- Order: Lepidoptera
- Family: Gracillariidae
- Genus: Acrocercops
- Species: A. leptalea

Binomial name
- Acrocercops leptalea (Turner, 1900)

Synonyms
- Gracilaria leptalea Turner, 1900

Species of moth

Acrocercops leptalea is a moth of the family Gracillariidae. It is known from Queensland, Australia.
