= Acrocercops melantherella =

Scientific classification
- Kingdom: Animalia
- Phylum: Arthropoda
- Clade: Pancrustacea
- Class: Insecta
- Order: Lepidoptera
- Family: Gracillariidae
- Genus: Acrocercops
- Species: A. melantherella

Binomial name
- Acrocercops melantherella Busck, 1934

Species of moth

Acrocercops melantherella is a moth of the family Gracillariidae. It is known from Cuba.

The larvae feed on Melanthera aspera and Melanthera deltoidea. They probably mine the leaves of their host plant.
