= Acrocercops calycophthalma =

Scientific classification
- Domain: Eukaryota
- Kingdom: Animalia
- Phylum: Arthropoda
- Class: Insecta
- Order: Lepidoptera
- Family: Gracillariidae
- Genus: Acrocercops
- Species: A. calycophthalma

Binomial name
- Acrocercops calycophthalma Meyrick, 1926

Species of moth

Acrocercops calycophthalma is a moth of the family Gracillariidae, known from Maharashtra and Karnataka, India.

The hostplant for the species is Terminalia bellirica. They mine the leaves of their host plant. The mine has the form of a blotch mine under the upper cuticle of the leaves. There may be up to seven larvae feeding in one mine.
