= Acrocercops tripolis =

Scientific classification
- Domain: Eukaryota
- Kingdom: Animalia
- Phylum: Arthropoda
- Class: Insecta
- Order: Lepidoptera
- Family: Gracillariidae
- Genus: Acrocercops
- Species: A. tripolis

Binomial name
- Acrocercops tripolis Meyrick, 1921

Species of moth

Acrocercops tripolis is a moth of the family Gracillariidae. It is known from Indonesia (Java).

== Original description ==
Wingspan 7 mm. Head white, collar pale ochreous-yellowish. Palpi somewhat roughened anteriorly, white, with rings of dark fuscous speckling at apex of second joint and middle of terminal. Basal joint of antennae with anterior tuft of scales. Thorax pale ochreous-yellowish, posterior third white. Abdomen whitish. Forewings very narrow, moderately pointed, acute; white, with some minute scattered fuscous specks; a costal dot of black irroration almost at base; moderate slightly oblique light ochreous-yellowish fasciae edged with some fuscous specks near base, before middle, and at 2 /3, third narrower; small blackish opposite spots on margins at 5/6, and a third in disc just before these; apex slightly yellowish-tinged: cilia grey-whitish, round apex finely speckled with grey. Hindwings light grey; cilia whitish-grey. Java, Pekalongan (van Deventer); one specimen.
