= Acrocercops trapezoides =

Scientific classification
- Domain: Eukaryota
- Kingdom: Animalia
- Phylum: Arthropoda
- Class: Insecta
- Order: Lepidoptera
- Family: Gracillariidae
- Genus: Acrocercops
- Species: A. trapezoides

Binomial name
- Acrocercops trapezoides (Turner, 1894)

Synonyms
- Gracilaria trapezoides Turner, 1894

Species of moth

Acrocercops trapezoides is a moth of the family Gracillariidae. It is known from Queensland, Australia.
