= Acrocercops thrylodes =

Scientific classification
- Kingdom: Animalia
- Phylum: Arthropoda
- Class: Insecta
- Order: Lepidoptera
- Family: Gracillariidae
- Genus: Acrocercops
- Species: A. thrylodes

Binomial name
- Acrocercops thrylodes Meyrick, 1930

Species of moth

Acrocercops thrylodes is a moth of the family Gracillariidae. It is known from India (Maharashtra).

The larvae feed on Carissa carandas. They probably mine the leaves of their host plant.
