= Acrocercops tristaniae =

Scientific classification
- Domain: Eukaryota
- Kingdom: Animalia
- Phylum: Arthropoda
- Class: Insecta
- Order: Lepidoptera
- Family: Gracillariidae
- Genus: Acrocercops
- Species: A. tristaniae

Binomial name
- Acrocercops tristaniae (Turner, 1894)

Synonyms
- Gracilaria tristaniae Turner, 1894

Species of moth

Acrocercops tristaniae is a moth of the family Gracillariidae. It is known from Queensland, Australia.

The larvae feed on Eugenia ventenatii and Lophostemon confertus. They probably mine the leaves of their host plant.
