= Acrocercops diffluella =

Scientific classification
- Kingdom: Animalia
- Phylum: Arthropoda
- Class: Insecta
- Order: Lepidoptera
- Family: Gracillariidae
- Genus: Acrocercops
- Species: A. diffluella

Binomial name
- Acrocercops diffluella (van Deventer, 1904)

Species of moth

Acrocercops diffluella is a moth of the family Gracillariidae, known from Java, Indonesia, and Selangor, Malaysia, as well as India, Papua New Guinea, and the Solomon Islands. It was described by W. van Deventer in 1904. The hostplants for the species include Terminalia arjuna and Terminalia catappa.
