= Acrocercops phaeodeta =

Scientific classification
- Kingdom: Animalia
- Phylum: Arthropoda
- Class: Insecta
- Order: Lepidoptera
- Family: Gracillariidae
- Genus: Acrocercops
- Species: A. phaeodeta

Binomial name
- Acrocercops phaeodeta Meyrick, 1927

Species of moth

Acrocercops phaeodeta is a moth of the family Gracillariidae, known from Samoa. It was described by Edward Meyrick in 1927.
