= Acrocercops glutella =

Scientific classification
- Domain: Eukaryota
- Kingdom: Animalia
- Phylum: Arthropoda
- Class: Insecta
- Order: Lepidoptera
- Family: Gracillariidae
- Genus: Acrocercops
- Species: A. glutella

Binomial name
- Acrocercops glutella (van Deventer, 1904)

Species of moth

Acrocercops glutella is a moth of the family Gracillariidae, known from Java, Indonesia. It was described by W. van Deventer in 1904. th hostplants for the species include Gluta rengus and Semecarpus heterophylla.
