= Acrocercops hexaclosta =

Scientific classification
- Kingdom: Animalia
- Phylum: Arthropoda
- Class: Insecta
- Order: Lepidoptera
- Family: Gracillariidae
- Genus: Acrocercops
- Species: A. hexaclosta

Binomial name
- Acrocercops hexaclosta Meyrick, 1934

Species of moth

Acrocercops hexaclosta is a moth of the family Gracillariidae, known from Java, Indonesia. It was described by Edward Meyrick in 1934. The hostplant for the species is an unidentified species of Macaranga.
