= Acrocercops lithochalca =

Scientific classification
- Kingdom: Animalia
- Phylum: Arthropoda
- Class: Insecta
- Order: Lepidoptera
- Family: Gracillariidae
- Genus: Acrocercops
- Species: A. lithochalca

Binomial name
- Acrocercops lithochalca Meyrick, 1930

Species of moth

Acrocercops lithochalca is a moth of the family Gracillariidae, known from Sikkim, India. It was described by Edward Meyrick in 1930.
