= Acrocercops chionoplecta =

Scientific classification
- Kingdom: Animalia
- Phylum: Arthropoda
- Class: Insecta
- Order: Lepidoptera
- Family: Gracillariidae
- Genus: Acrocercops
- Species: A. chionoplecta

Binomial name
- Acrocercops chionoplecta (Meyrick, 1882)

Synonyms
- Gracilaria chionoplecta Meyrick, 1882

Species of moth

Acrocercops chionoplecta is a moth of the family Gracillariidae. It is known from New South Wales, Australia.

The larvae feed on Phebalium dentatum. They probably mine the leaves of their host plant.
