= Acrocercops querci =

Scientific classification
- Kingdom: Animalia
- Phylum: Arthropoda
- Class: Insecta
- Order: Lepidoptera
- Family: Gracillariidae
- Genus: Acrocercops
- Species: A. querci

Binomial name
- Acrocercops querci Kumata & Kuroko, 1988

Species of moth

Acrocercops querci is a moth of the family Gracillariidae. It is known from Japan (Honshū).

The wingspan is 7–9.8 mm.

The larvae feed on Quercus species, including Quercus glauca. They mine the leaves of their host plant.
