= Acrocercops trissoptila =

Scientific classification
- Domain: Eukaryota
- Kingdom: Animalia
- Phylum: Arthropoda
- Class: Insecta
- Order: Lepidoptera
- Family: Gracillariidae
- Genus: Acrocercops
- Species: A. trissoptila

Binomial name
- Acrocercops trissoptila Meyrick, 1921

Species of moth

Acrocercops trissoptila is a moth of the family Gracillariidae. It is known from India (Gujarat and Maharashtra).
