= Acrocercops aeolellum =

Scientific classification
- Kingdom: Animalia
- Phylum: Arthropoda
- Clade: Pancrustacea
- Class: Insecta
- Order: Lepidoptera
- Family: Gracillariidae
- Genus: Acrocercops
- Species: A. aeolellum

Binomial name
- Acrocercops aeolellum (Meyrick, 1880)

Synonyms
- Coriscium aeolellum Meyrick, 1880; Acrocercops aeolella Turner, 1940

Species of moth

Acrocercops aeolellum is a moth of the family Gracillariidae. It is known from New South Wales, Australia.
