= Acrocercops cylicota =

Scientific classification
- Kingdom: Animalia
- Phylum: Arthropoda
- Class: Insecta
- Order: Lepidoptera
- Family: Gracillariidae
- Genus: Acrocercops
- Species: A. cylicota

Binomial name
- Acrocercops cylicota Meyrick, 1914

Species of moth

Acrocercops cylicota is a moth of the family Gracillariidae, known from Karnataka and Maharashtra, India. It was described by Edward Meyrick in 1914. The hostplants for the species include Colebrookea oppositifolia and Elsholtzia fruticosa.
