= Acrocercops tricirrha =

Scientific classification
- Kingdom: Animalia
- Phylum: Arthropoda
- Class: Insecta
- Order: Lepidoptera
- Family: Gracillariidae
- Genus: Acrocercops
- Species: A. tricirrha

Binomial name
- Acrocercops tricirrha Meyrick, 1935

Species of moth

Acrocercops tricirrha is a moth of the family Gracillariidae. It is known from Indonesia (Java).

The larvae feed on Persicaria chinensis. They probably mine the leaves of their host plant.
