= Acrocercops xystrota =

Scientific classification
- Domain: Eukaryota
- Kingdom: Animalia
- Phylum: Arthropoda
- Class: Insecta
- Order: Lepidoptera
- Family: Gracillariidae
- Genus: Acrocercops
- Species: A. xystrota

Binomial name
- Acrocercops xystrota Meyrick, 1915

Species of moth

Acrocercops xystrota is a moth of the family Gracillariidae. It is known from Guyana.
