= Acrocercops crypsigrapha =

Scientific classification
- Kingdom: Animalia
- Phylum: Arthropoda
- Class: Insecta
- Order: Lepidoptera
- Family: Gracillariidae
- Genus: Acrocercops
- Species: A. crypsigrapha

Binomial name
- Acrocercops crypsigrapha Meyrick, 1930

Species of moth

Acrocercops crypsigrapha is a moth of the family Gracillariidae, known from Myanmar. It was described by Edward Meyrick in 1930.
