= Acrocercops argyrodesma =

Scientific classification
- Kingdom: Animalia
- Phylum: Arthropoda
- Clade: Pancrustacea
- Class: Insecta
- Order: Lepidoptera
- Family: Gracillariidae
- Genus: Acrocercops
- Species: A. argyrodesma

Binomial name
- Acrocercops argyrodesma (Meyrick, 1882)

Synonyms
- Gracilaria argyrodesma Meyrick, 1882

Species of moth

Acrocercops argyrodesma is a moth of the family Gracillariidae. It is known from New South Wales, Australia.

The larvae feed on Grevillea linearis, and potentially mine the leaves of their host plant.
