= Acrocercops anthracuris =

Scientific classification
- Domain: Eukaryota
- Kingdom: Animalia
- Phylum: Arthropoda
- Class: Insecta
- Order: Lepidoptera
- Family: Gracillariidae
- Genus: Acrocercops
- Species: A. anthracuris

Binomial name
- Acrocercops anthracuris Meyrick, 1926

Species of moth

Acrocercops anthracuris is a moth of the family Gracillariidae, known from Maharashtra, India. The host plant for the species is Pongamia pinnata.
