= Acrocercops viatica =

Scientific classification
- Domain: Eukaryota
- Kingdom: Animalia
- Phylum: Arthropoda
- Class: Insecta
- Order: Lepidoptera
- Family: Gracillariidae
- Genus: Acrocercops
- Species: A. viatica

Binomial name
- Acrocercops viatica Meyrick, 1916

Species of moth

Acrocercops viatica is a moth of the family Gracillariidae. It is known from India (Karnataka).
