= Acrocercops diatonica =

Scientific classification
- Domain: Eukaryota
- Kingdom: Animalia
- Phylum: Arthropoda
- Class: Insecta
- Order: Lepidoptera
- Family: Gracillariidae
- Genus: Acrocercops
- Species: A. diatonica

Binomial name
- Acrocercops diatonica Meyrick, 1916

Species of moth

Acrocercops diatonica is a moth of the family Gracillariidae, known from Karnataka, India, as well as West Malaysia, Papua New Guinea, and Thailand. It was described by Edward Meyrick in 1916. The hostplant for the species is Theobroma cacao and Mangifera species.
