= Acrocercops leucographa =

Scientific classification
- Kingdom: Animalia
- Phylum: Arthropoda
- Class: Insecta
- Order: Lepidoptera
- Family: Gracillariidae
- Genus: Acrocercops
- Species: A. leucographa

Binomial name
- Acrocercops leucographa Clarke, 1953

Species of moth

Acrocercops leucographa is a moth of the family Gracillariidae. It is known from Argentina.
