= Acrocercops ramigera =

Scientific classification
- Kingdom: Animalia
- Phylum: Arthropoda
- Clade: Pancrustacea
- Class: Insecta
- Order: Lepidoptera
- Family: Gracillariidae
- Genus: Acrocercops
- Species: A. ramigera

Binomial name
- Acrocercops ramigera Meyrick, 1920

Species of moth

Acrocercops ramigera is a moth of the family Gracillariidae. It is found in Brazil.
