= Acrocercops unipuncta =

Scientific classification
- Domain: Eukaryota
- Kingdom: Animalia
- Phylum: Arthropoda
- Class: Insecta
- Order: Lepidoptera
- Family: Gracillariidae
- Genus: Acrocercops
- Species: A. unipuncta

Binomial name
- Acrocercops unipuncta Bradley, 1957

Species of moth

Acrocercops unipuncta is a moth of the family Gracillariidae. It is known from Rennell Island.
