= Acrocercops martaella =

Scientific classification
- Domain: Eukaryota
- Kingdom: Animalia
- Phylum: Arthropoda
- Class: Insecta
- Order: Lepidoptera
- Family: Gracillariidae
- Genus: Acrocercops
- Species: A. martaella

Binomial name
- Acrocercops martaella Legrand, 1965

Species of moth

Acrocercops martaella is a moth of the family Gracillariidae. It is known from the Seychelles.
