= Acrocercops albomaculella =

Scientific classification
- Kingdom: Animalia
- Phylum: Arthropoda
- Clade: Pancrustacea
- Class: Insecta
- Order: Lepidoptera
- Family: Gracillariidae
- Genus: Acrocercops
- Species: A. albomaculella

Binomial name
- Acrocercops albomaculella (Turner, 1894)

Synonyms
- Gracilaria albomaculella Turner, 1894; Gracilaria albimaculella; Turner, 1896

Species of moth

Acrocercops albomaculella is a moth of the family Gracillariidae. It is known from Queensland, Australia.
