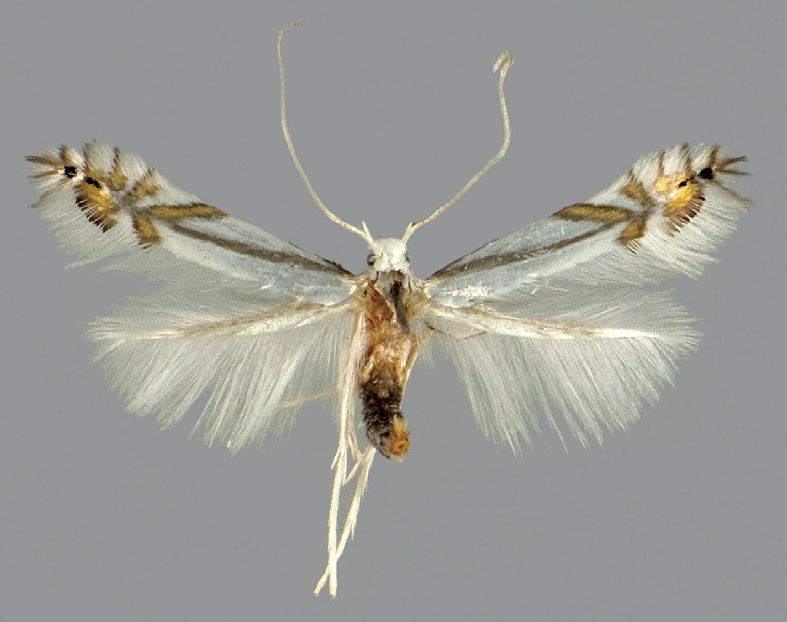
- Phyllocnistis tropaeolicola

Scientific classification
- Domain: Eukaryota
- Kingdom: Animalia
- Phylum: Arthropoda
- Class: Insecta
- Order: Lepidoptera
- Family: Gracillariidae
- Subfamily: Phyllocnistinae; Herrich-Schäffer, 1857

Genera
- 1

= Phyllocnistinae =

Subfamily of moths

Phyllocnistinae is a subfamily of insects in the moth family Gracillariidae.

== Genera ==
Genera:

- Phyllocnistis Zeller, 1848
