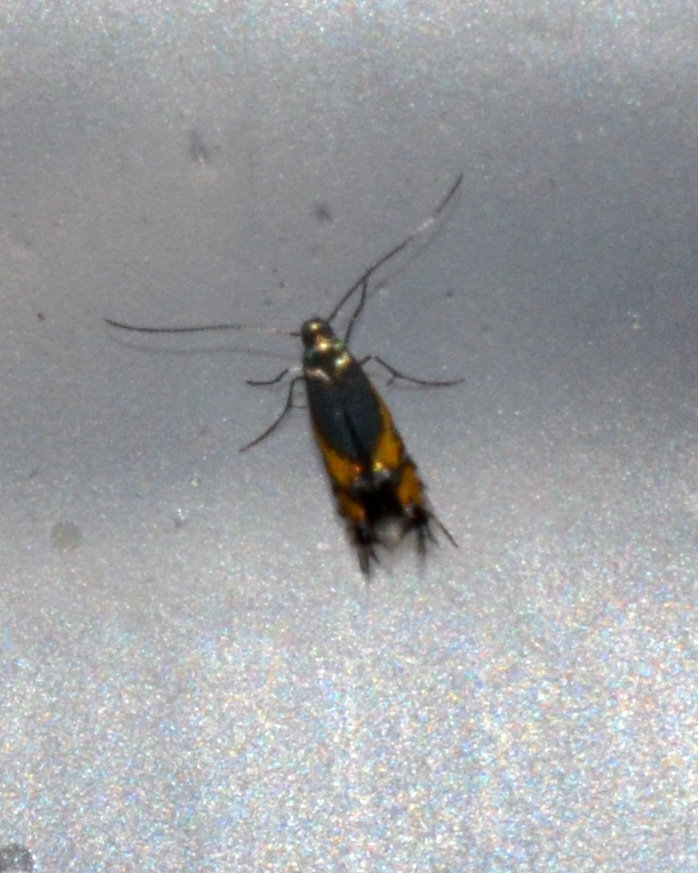

Scientific classification
- Kingdom: Animalia
- Phylum: Arthropoda
- Clade: Pancrustacea
- Class: Insecta
- Order: Lepidoptera
- Family: Gracillariidae
- Genus: Phyllocnistis
- Species: P. insignis

Binomial name
- Phyllocnistis insignis Frey & Boll, 1876

Synonyms
- Phyllocnistis erechtitisella Chambers, 1878; Phyllocnistis erechtiisella Dyar, [1903]

= Phyllocnistis insignis =

Species of moth

Phyllocnistis insignis is a moth of the family Gracillariidae, found throughout the United States (including Maine, Illinois, Ohio, Maryland, Michigan, Kentucky, Missouri, Texas, Georgia, Florida and California).

The hostplants for the species include Arnoglossum muehlenbergii, Erechtites hieracifolia, Prenanthes alba, and Packera aurea. They mine the leaves of their host plant. The mine has the form of a long, narrow, linear, winding mine on the upperside of the leaf.
