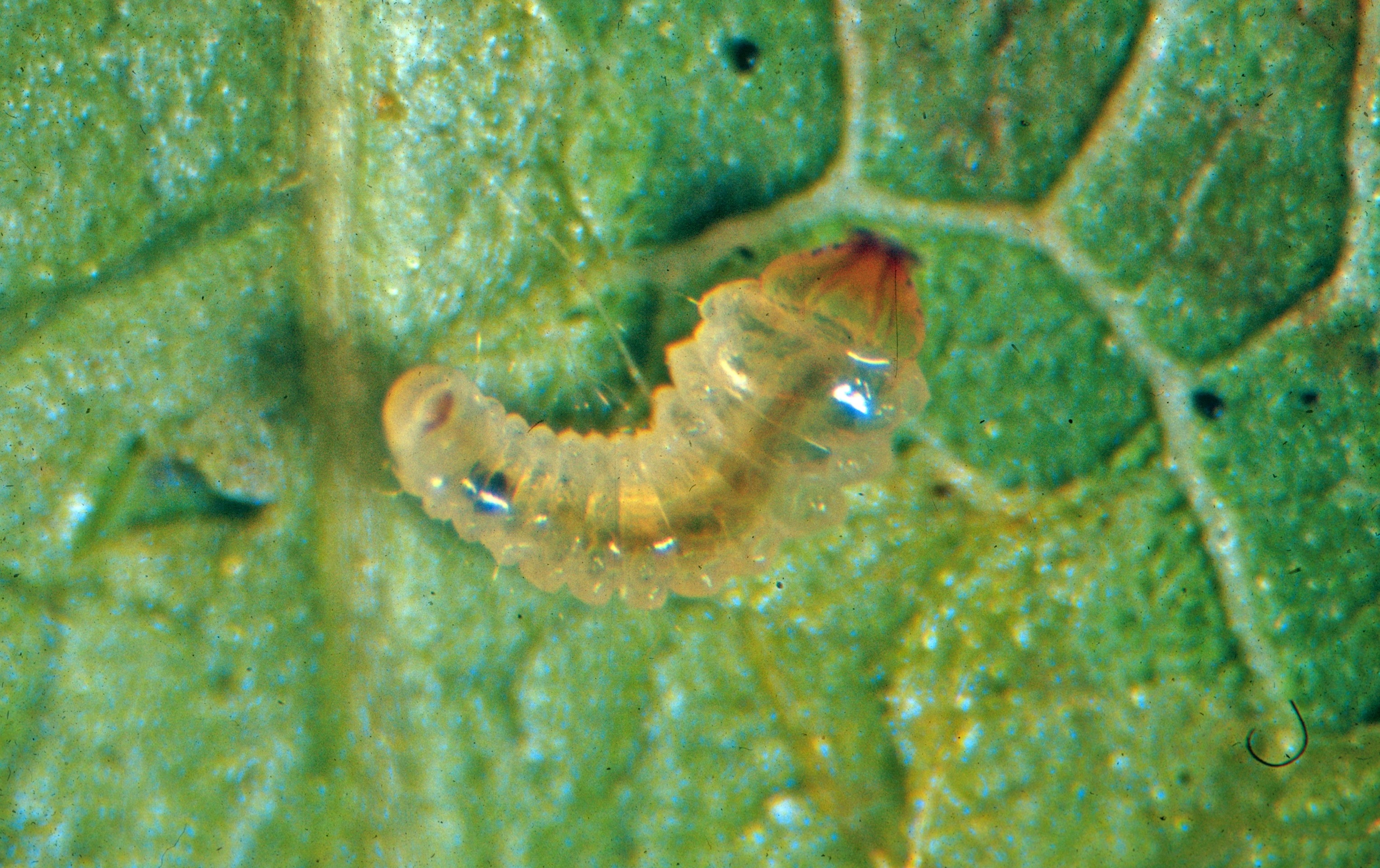

Scientific classification
- Kingdom: Animalia
- Phylum: Arthropoda
- Clade: Pancrustacea
- Class: Insecta
- Order: Lepidoptera
- Family: Gracillariidae
- Genus: Phyllocnistis
- Species: P. populiella

Binomial name
- Phyllocnistis populiella Chambers, 1875

= Phyllocnistis populiella =

Species of moth

Phyllocnistis populiella, the common aspen leaf miner or aspen serpentine leafminer, is a moth of the family Gracillariidae. It is found in northern North America, including Alberta, Massachusetts, Ontario and Alaska.

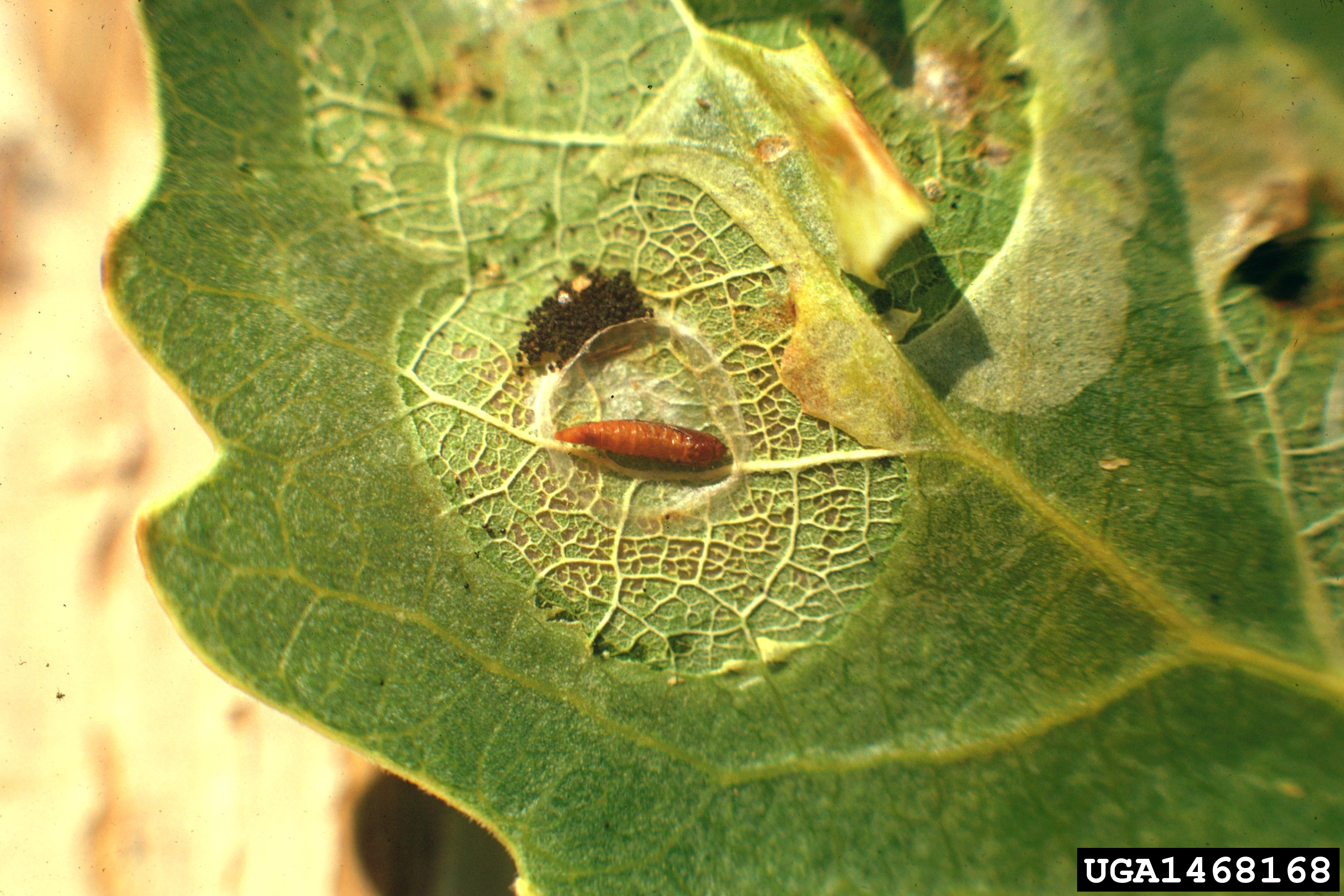
Pupa

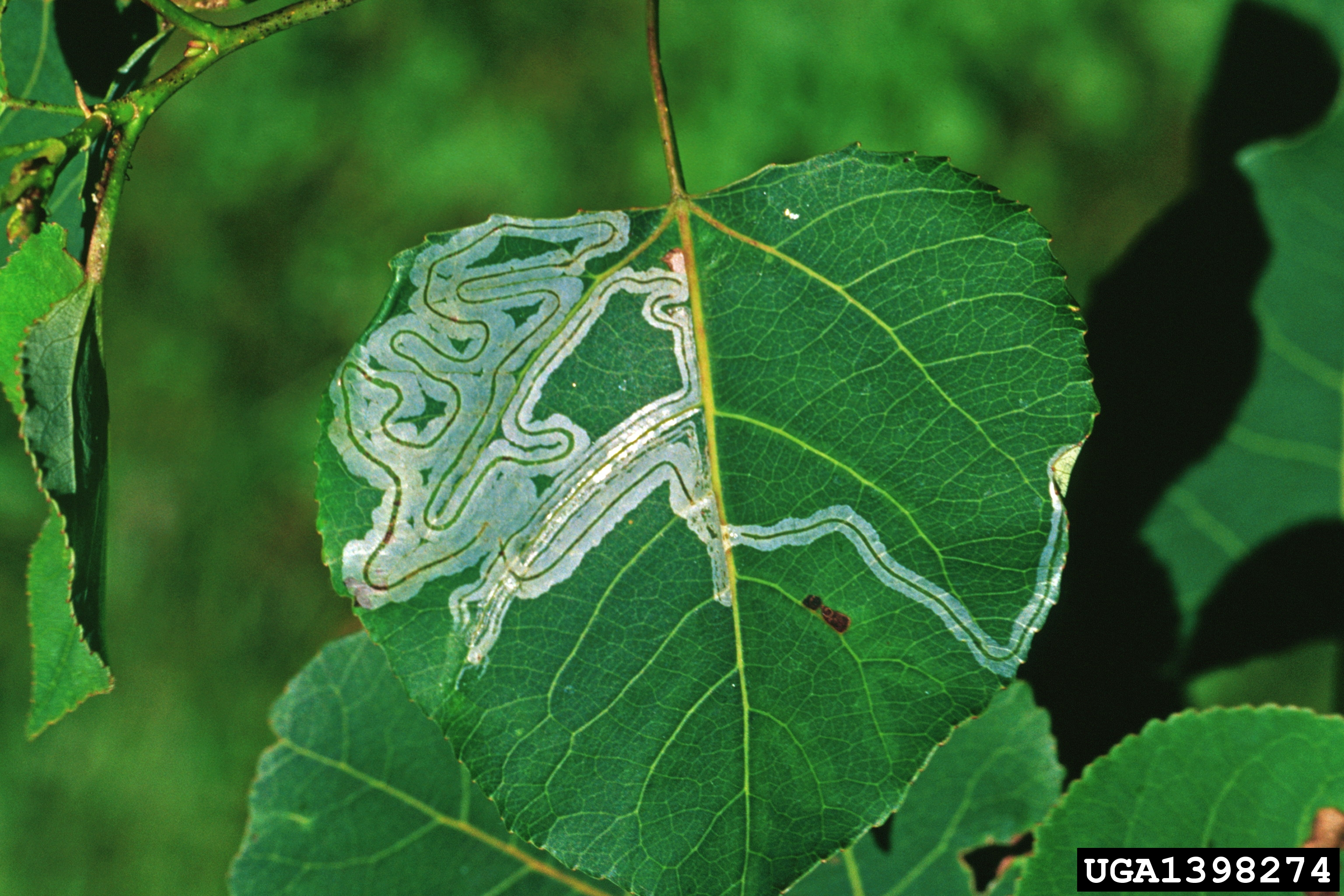
Damage

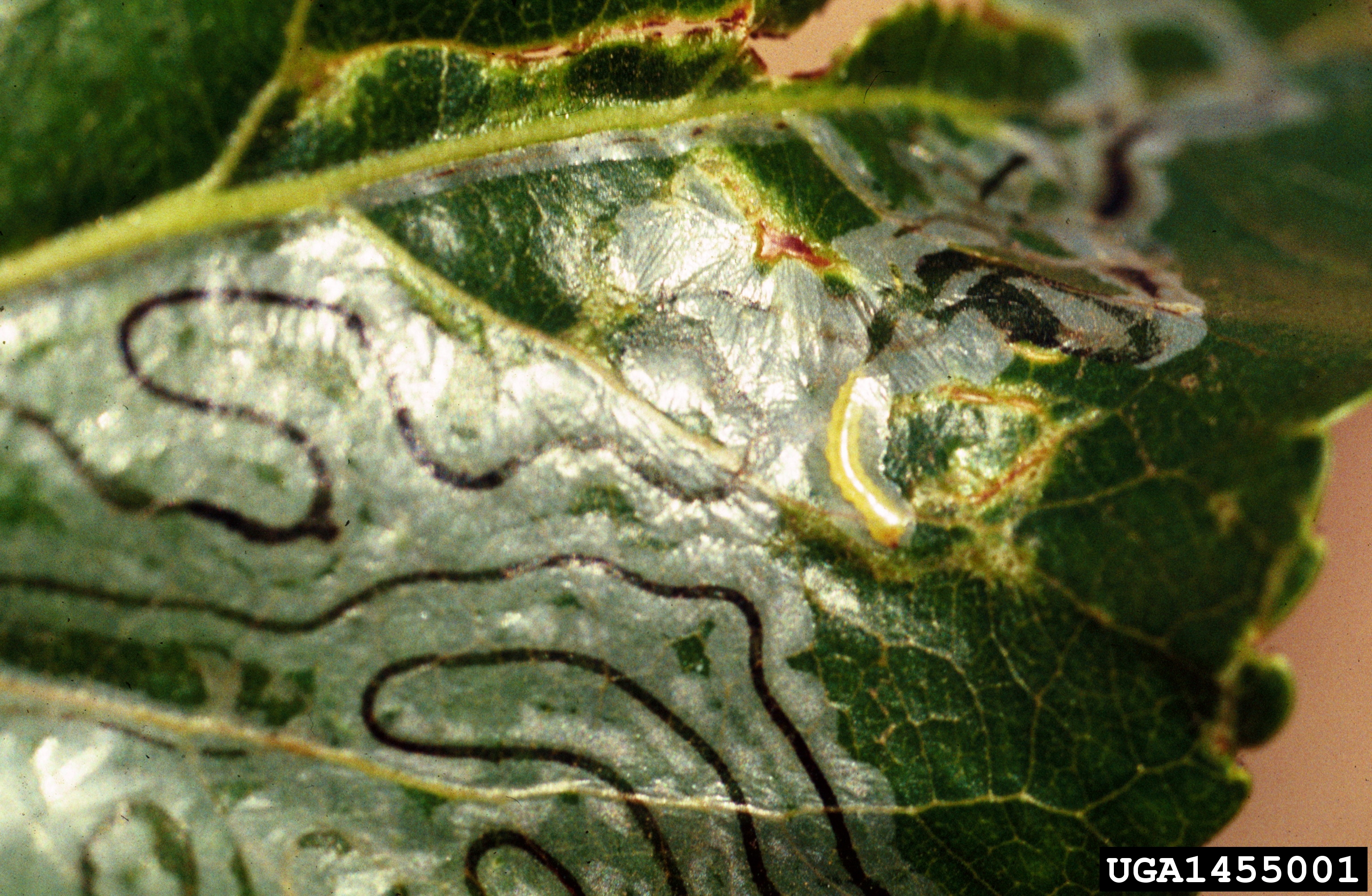
Damage

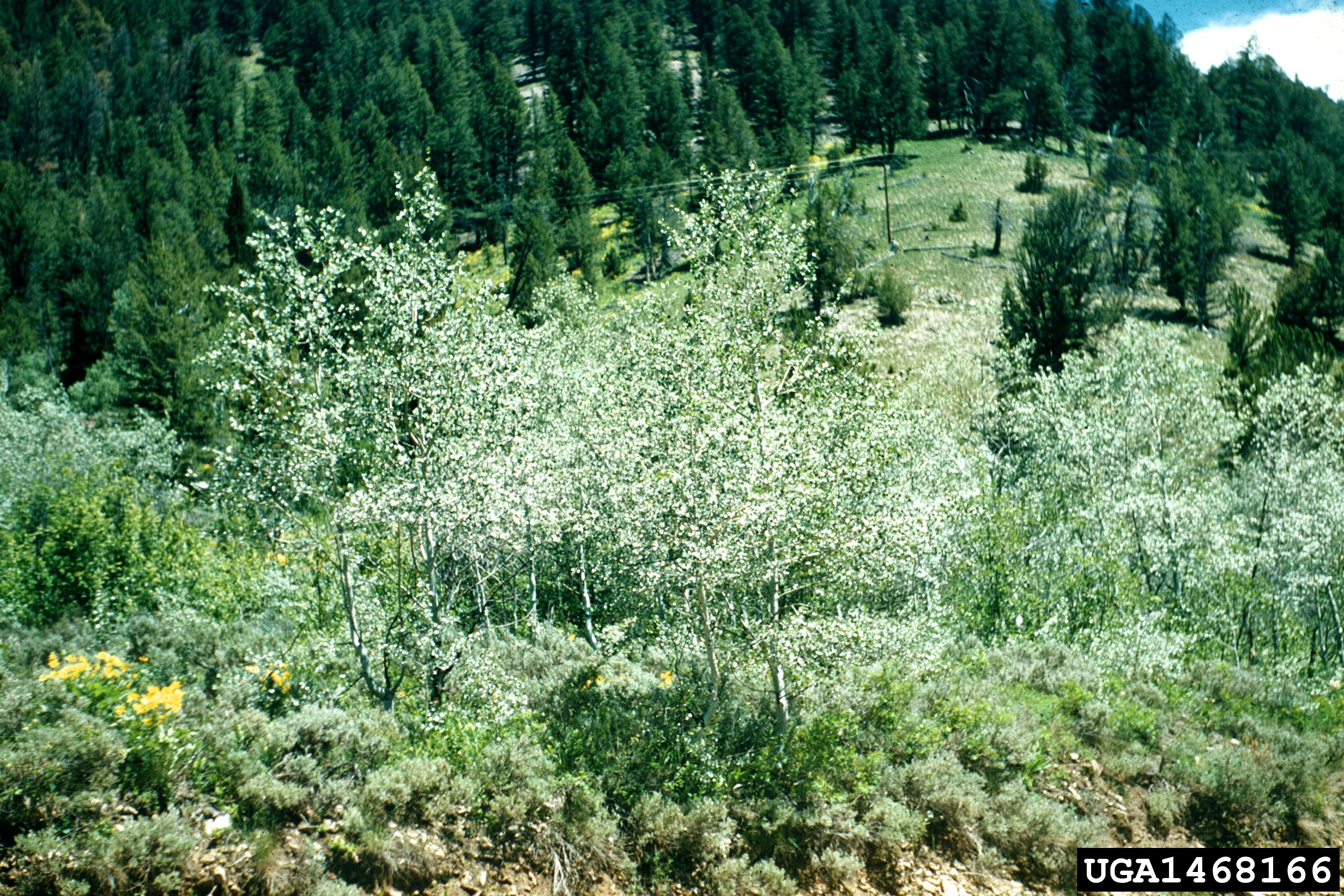
Infestation

The larvae feed on Populus tremuloides and balsam poplar.
