= Phyllocnistis breynilla =

Scientific classification
- Kingdom: Animalia
- Phylum: Arthropoda
- Class: Insecta
- Order: Lepidoptera
- Family: Gracillariidae
- Genus: Phyllocnistis
- Species: P. breynilla

Binomial name
- Phyllocnistis breynilla Liu & Zang, 1989

Species of moth

Phyllocnistis breynilla is a moth of the family Gracillariidae, known from Guangdong, China.

The hostplant for the species is Breynia fruticosa, and the moths mine on the upper side of the plant's leaves.
