= Phyllocnistis spatulata =

Scientific classification
- Kingdom: Animalia
- Phylum: Arthropoda
- Class: Insecta
- Order: Lepidoptera
- Family: Gracillariidae
- Genus: Phyllocnistis
- Species: P. spatulata

Binomial name
- Phyllocnistis spatulata (Meyrick, 1928)

Species of moth

Phyllocnistis spatulata is a moth of the family Gracillariidae, known from Assam, India. The hostplant for the species is Lindera caudata.
