= Phyllocnistis hyperbolacma =

Scientific classification
- Kingdom: Animalia
- Phylum: Arthropoda
- Class: Insecta
- Order: Lepidoptera
- Family: Gracillariidae
- Genus: Phyllocnistis
- Species: P. hyperbolacma

Binomial name
- Phyllocnistis hyperbolacma (Meyrick, 1931)

Species of moth

Phyllocnistis hyperbolacma is a moth of the family Gracillariidae, known from Honshū, Japan. It was named by E. Meyrick in 1931.
