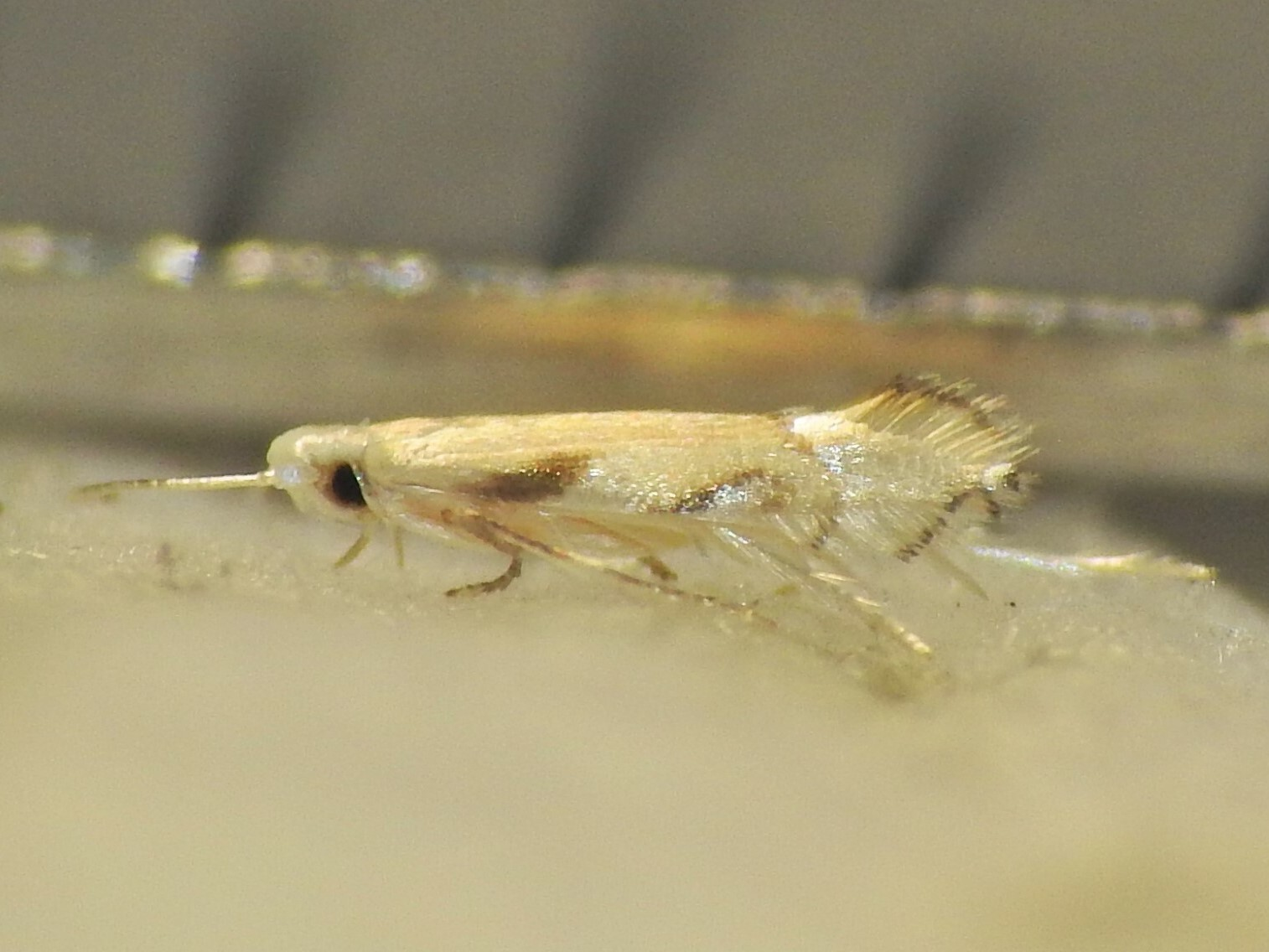

Scientific classification
- Kingdom: Animalia
- Phylum: Arthropoda
- Clade: Pancrustacea
- Class: Insecta
- Order: Lepidoptera
- Family: Gracillariidae
- Genus: Phyllocnistis
- Species: P. iodocella

Binomial name
- Phyllocnistis iodocella Meyrick, 1880

= Phyllocnistis iodocella =

Species of moth

Phyllocnistis iodocella is a species of moth in the family Gracillariidae. It is known from New South Wales, Australia.
