= Phyllocnistis amydropa =

Scientific classification
- Kingdom: Animalia
- Phylum: Arthropoda
- Class: Insecta
- Order: Lepidoptera
- Family: Gracillariidae
- Genus: Phyllocnistis
- Species: P. amydropa

Binomial name
- Phyllocnistis amydropa (Meyrick, 1934)

Species of moth

Phyllocnistis amydropa is a moth of the family Gracillariidae, known from Maharashtra, India.

The hostplant for the species is Gmelina arborea. They mine the leaves of their host plant. The mine has the form of a wandering gallery under the upper cuticle of the leaf.
