= Phyllocnistis intermediella =

Scientific classification
- Domain: Eukaryota
- Kingdom: Animalia
- Phylum: Arthropoda
- Class: Insecta
- Order: Lepidoptera
- Family: Gracillariidae
- Genus: Phyllocnistis
- Species: P. intermediella

Binomial name
- Phyllocnistis intermediella Busck, 1900

Species of moth

Phyllocnistis intermediella is a moth of the family Gracillariidae, known from Florida, U.S.A.

The hostplants for the species include Mastichodendron foetidissimum, and Sideroxylon pallidum. They mine the leaves of their host plant. The mine is found on the underside of the leaf. It has the form of a long, whitish, irregular serpentine just below the epidermis, confined to one side of the leaf and not crossing the main rib.
