= Phyllocnistis stereograpta =

Scientific classification
- Kingdom: Animalia
- Phylum: Arthropoda
- Class: Insecta
- Order: Lepidoptera
- Family: Gracillariidae
- Genus: Phyllocnistis
- Species: P. stereograpta

Binomial name
- Phyllocnistis stereograpta (Meyrick, 1934)

Species of moth

Phyllocnistis stereograpta is a moth of the family Gracillariidae, known from Maharashtra, India.

The hostplant for the species is Stereospermum suaveolens. They mine the leaves of their host plant. The mine consists of a wandering gallery in the leaf.
