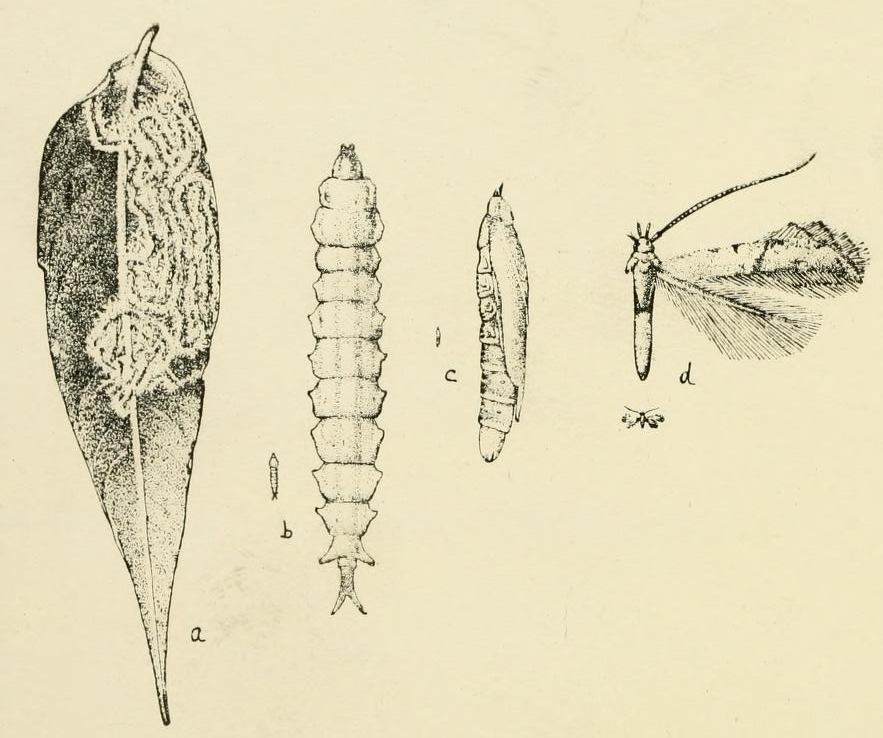

Scientific classification
- Kingdom: Animalia
- Phylum: Arthropoda
- Class: Insecta
- Order: Lepidoptera
- Family: Gracillariidae
- Genus: Phyllocnistis
- Species: P. helicodes

Binomial name
- Phyllocnistis helicodes Meyrick, 1916

= Phyllocnistis helicodes =

Species of moth

Phyllocnistis helicodes is a moth of the family Gracillariidae, known from Bihar, India. The hostplant for the species is Polyalthia longifolia.
