= Phyllocnistis phrixopa =

Scientific classification
- Kingdom: Animalia
- Phylum: Arthropoda
- Class: Insecta
- Order: Lepidoptera
- Family: Gracillariidae
- Genus: Phyllocnistis
- Species: P. phrixopa

Binomial name
- Phyllocnistis phrixopa (Meyrick, 1926)

Species of moth

Phyllocnistis phrixopa is a moth of the family Gracillariidae, known from Maharashtra and Karnataka, India. The hostplants for the species include Casearia esculenta, and Casearia multinervosa.
