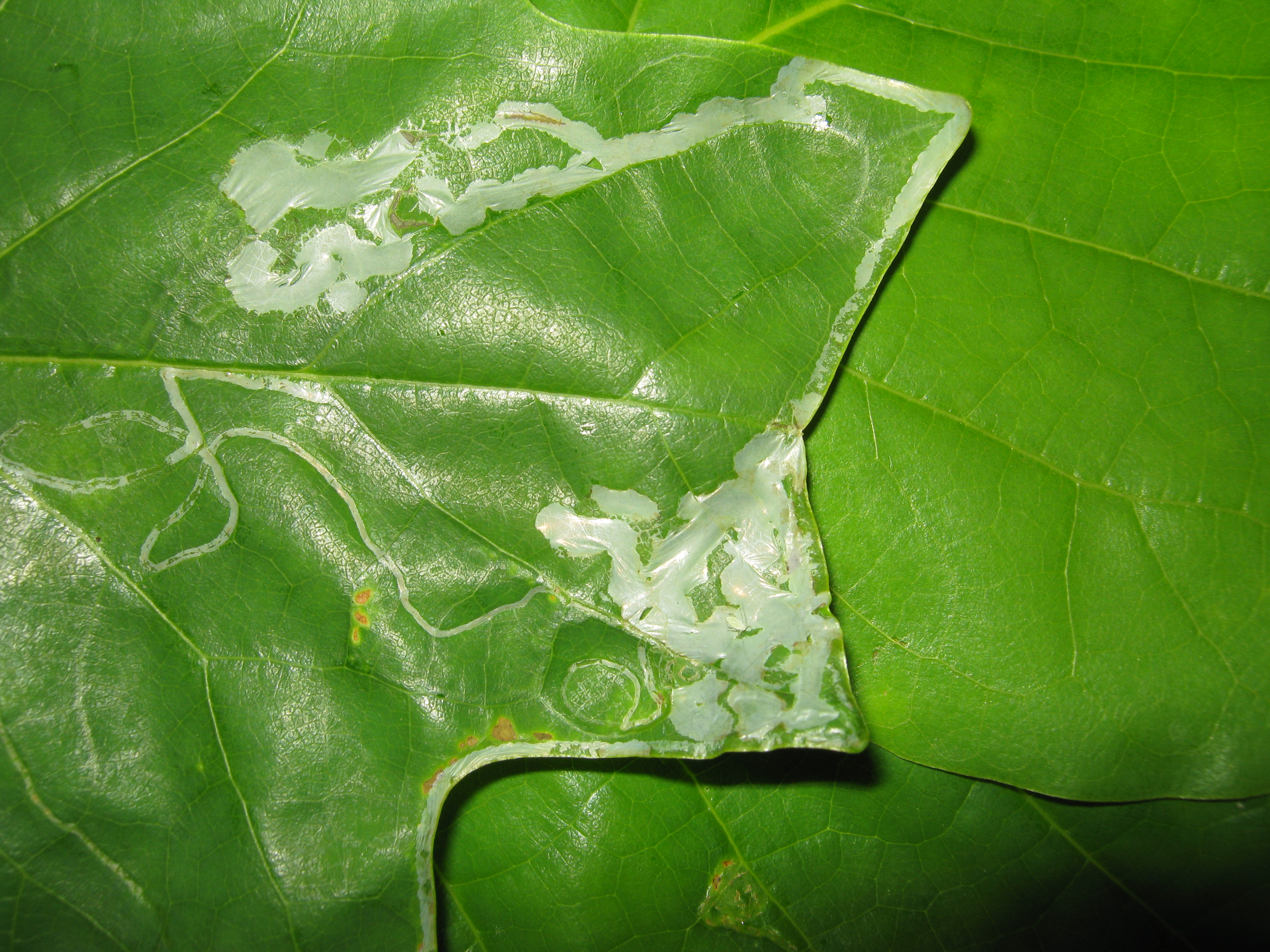
- Leaf mines on tulip tree, Liriodendron

Scientific classification
- Kingdom: Animalia
- Phylum: Arthropoda
- Clade: Pancrustacea
- Class: Insecta
- Order: Lepidoptera
- Family: Gracillariidae
- Genus: Phyllocnistis
- Species: P. liriodendronella

Binomial name
- Phyllocnistis liriodendronella (Clemens, 1863)

Synonyms
- Phyllocnistis liriodendrella Dyar, [1903]

= Phyllocnistis liriodendronella =

Species of moth

Phyllocnistis liriodendronella is a moth of the family Gracillariidae, known from the United States (New York, New Jersey, Maryland, Pennsylvania and Kentucky). The hostplants for the species include Liriodendron tulipifera, Magnolia grandiflora, and Magnolia virginiana. They mine the leaves of their host plant.
