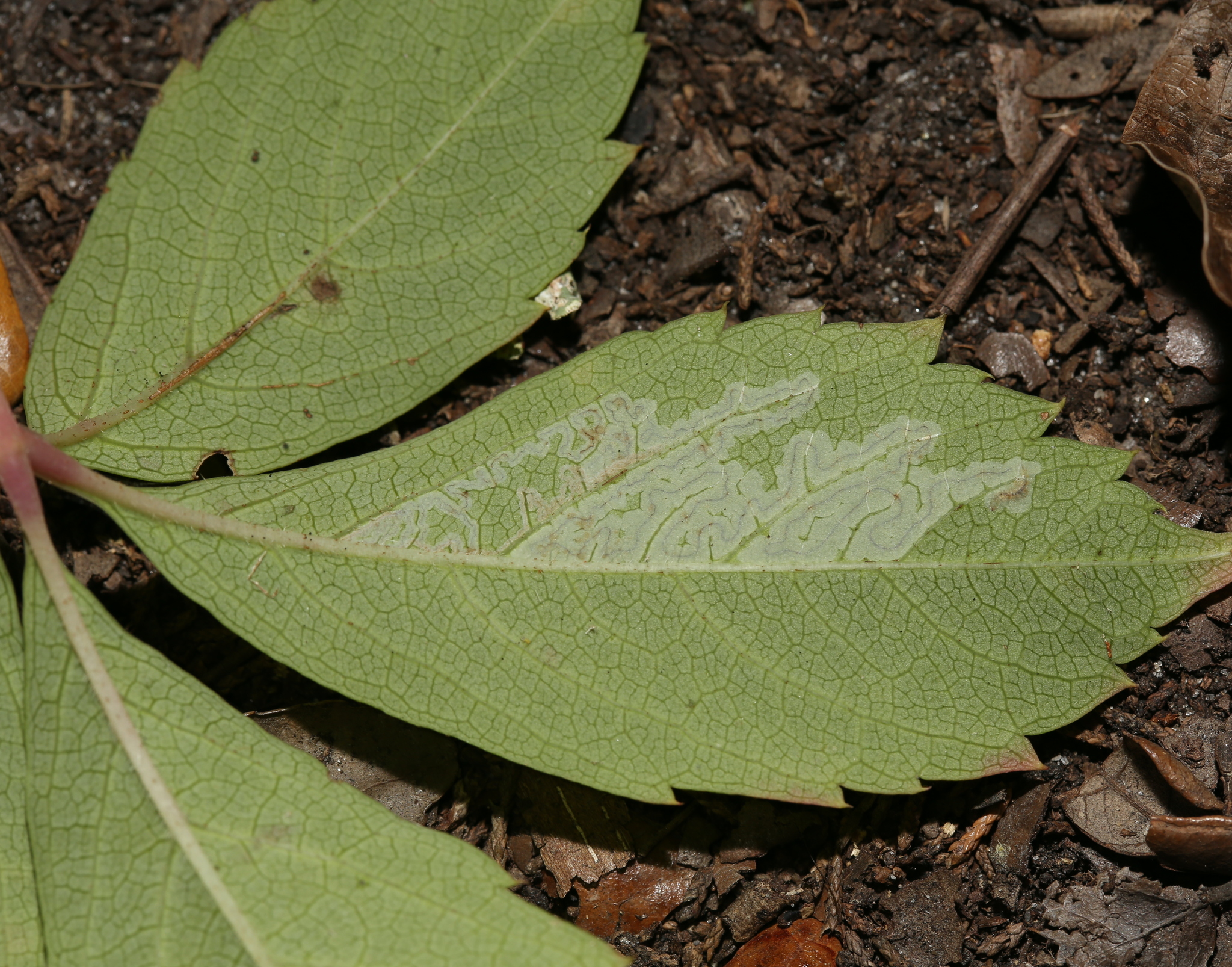
- Leaf mine on Parthenocissus quinquefolia

Scientific classification
- Kingdom: Animalia
- Phylum: Arthropoda
- Clade: Pancrustacea
- Class: Insecta
- Order: Lepidoptera
- Family: Gracillariidae
- Genus: Phyllocnistis
- Species: P. ampelopsiella

Binomial name
- Phyllocnistis ampelopsiella (Chambers, 1871)

= Phyllocnistis ampelopsiella =

Species of moth

Phyllocnistis ampelopsiella is a moth of the family Gracillariidae, known from Québec and the United States (Colorado, Kentucky, Maine and New York).

The host plants for the species include Parthenocissus quinquefolia, Psedera quinquefolia, and Vitis vinifera. They mine the leaves of their host plant, producing a white, convoluted mine on the underside of the leaf. Although it is somewhat linear, it winds about from the midrib to the margin and back, between the veins of the leaf until the entire cuticle in the mined portion is separated, and the mine becomes a blotch.
