= Phyllocnistis humiliella =

Scientific classification
- Kingdom: Animalia
- Phylum: Arthropoda
- Class: Insecta
- Order: Lepidoptera
- Family: Gracillariidae
- Genus: Phyllocnistis
- Species: P. humiliella

Binomial name
- Phyllocnistis humiliella (van Deventer, 1904)

Species of moth

Phyllocnistis humiliella is a moth of the family Gracillariidae, known from Java, Indonesia. The hostplant for the species is Cinnamomum iners.
