= Phyllocnistis abatiae =

Scientific classification
- Kingdom: Animalia
- Phylum: Arthropoda
- Class: Insecta
- Order: Lepidoptera
- Family: Gracillariidae
- Genus: Phyllocnistis
- Species: P. abatiae

Binomial name
- Phyllocnistis abatiae (E.M. Hering, 1958)

Species of moth

Phyllocnistis abatiae is a moth of the family Gracillariidae, known from Argentina. The hostplant for the species is Abatia stellata.
