= Phyllocnistis exiguella =

Scientific classification
- Kingdom: Animalia
- Phylum: Arthropoda
- Class: Insecta
- Order: Lepidoptera
- Family: Gracillariidae
- Genus: Phyllocnistis
- Species: P. exiguella

Binomial name
- Phyllocnistis exiguella (van Deventer, 1904)

Species of moth

Phyllocnistis exiguella is a moth of the family Gracillariidae, known from Java, Indonesia. The hostplants for the species include Buchanania arborescens and Buchanania florida.
