= Phyllocnistis toparcha =

Scientific classification
- Kingdom: Animalia
- Phylum: Arthropoda
- Clade: Pancrustacea
- Class: Insecta
- Order: Lepidoptera
- Family: Gracillariidae
- Genus: Phyllocnistis
- Species: P. toparcha

Binomial name
- Phyllocnistis toparcha (Meyrick, 1918)

Synonyms
- Phyllocnistis pachyscia Meyrick, 1931

Species of moth

Phyllocnistis toparcha is a moth of the family Gracillariidae, known from Honshū, Japan, and Tamil Nadu, India. The hostplant for the species is Vitis vinifera.
