= Phyllocnistis ramulicola =

Scientific classification
- Domain: Eukaryota
- Kingdom: Animalia
- Phylum: Arthropoda
- Class: Insecta
- Order: Lepidoptera
- Family: Gracillariidae
- Genus: Phyllocnistis
- Species: P. ramulicola

Binomial name
- Phyllocnistis ramulicola Langmaid & Corley, 2007

Species of moth

Phyllocnistis ramulicola is a moth of the family Gracillariidae. It is known from southern Great Britain and Portugal.

The larvae feed on Salix cinerea, Salix caprea, Salix aurita, Salix fragilis and Salix viminalis. They mine the leaves of their host plant.
