= Phyllocnistis chrysophthalma =

Scientific classification
- Kingdom: Animalia
- Phylum: Arthropoda
- Clade: Pancrustacea
- Class: Insecta
- Order: Lepidoptera
- Family: Gracillariidae
- Genus: Phyllocnistis
- Species: P. chrysophthalma

Binomial name
- Phyllocnistis chrysophthalma (Meyrick, 1915)

Species of moth

Phyllocnistis chrysophthalma is a moth of the family Gracillariidae, known from Karnataka, India.

The species' host plants include Cinnamomum verum and Cinnamomum zeylanicum. They mine the leaves of these host plants. The mine takes the form of a blotch under the lower cuticle. It is elongated and winding, and the larva's path is marked by frass forming a wavy, continuous, fine dark line.
