= Phyllocnistis micrographa =

Scientific classification
- Kingdom: Animalia
- Phylum: Arthropoda
- Class: Insecta
- Order: Lepidoptera
- Family: Gracillariidae
- Genus: Phyllocnistis
- Species: P. micrographa

Binomial name
- Phyllocnistis micrographa (Meyrick, 1916)

Species of moth

Phyllocnistis micrographa is a moth of the family Gracillariidae, known from Karnataka, India. It was named by E. Meyrick in 1916.
