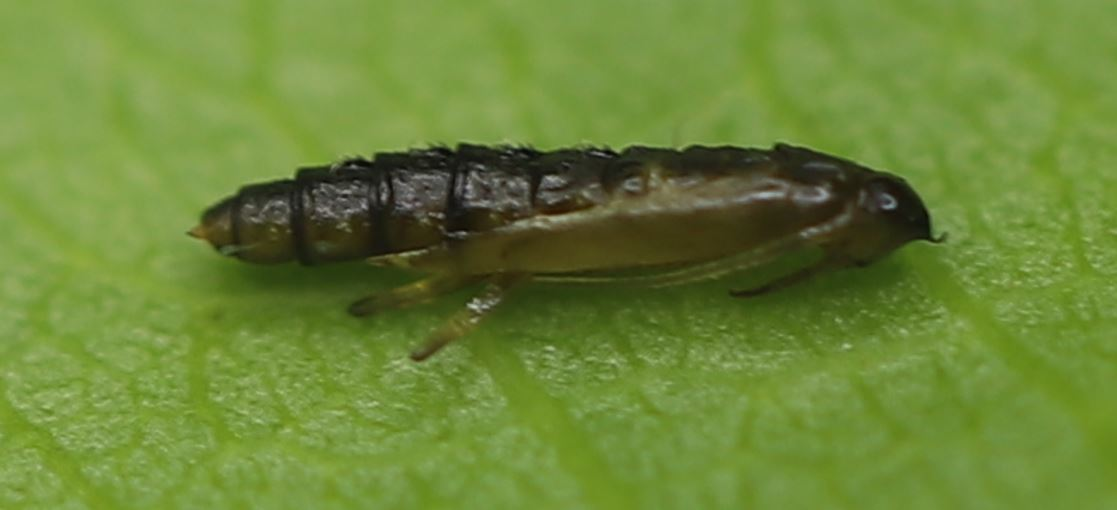
- Phyllocnistis extrematrix pupa

Scientific classification
- Kingdom: Animalia
- Phylum: Arthropoda
- Class: Insecta
- Order: Lepidoptera
- Family: Gracillariidae
- Genus: Phyllocnistis
- Species: P. extrematrix

Binomial name
- Phyllocnistis extrematrix Martynova, 1955

= Phyllocnistis extrematrix =

Species of moth

Phyllocnistis extrematrix is a moth in the family Gracillariidae. It is found widely in central and southern Europe, and in Kazakhstan and the Asian part of Russia; it has also recently colonised England, where it was first discovered in Norfolk on 29 July 2025.

The larvae feed on several species of poplar, including Populus balsamifera, Populus × canadensis, Populus nigra, Populus suaveolens and Populus trichocarpa, forming mines which start near the base of the leaf and then work down the leaf petiole and into young stems.
