= Phyllocnistis wygodzinskyi =

Scientific classification
- Domain: Eukaryota
- Kingdom: Animalia
- Phylum: Arthropoda
- Class: Insecta
- Order: Lepidoptera
- Family: Gracillariidae
- Genus: Phyllocnistis
- Species: P. wygodzinskyi

Binomial name
- Phyllocnistis wygodzinskyi E. M. Hering, 1958

Species of moth

Phyllocnistis wygodzinskyi is a moth of the family Gracillariidae, known from Argentina. It was described by German entomologist Erich Martin Hering in 1958. The larvae feed on Asteraceae species. They probably mine the leaves of their host plant.
