= Phyllocnistis tectonivora =

Scientific classification
- Kingdom: Animalia
- Phylum: Arthropoda
- Class: Insecta
- Order: Lepidoptera
- Family: Gracillariidae
- Genus: Phyllocnistis
- Species: P. tectonivora

Binomial name
- Phyllocnistis tectonivora (Meyrick, 1936)

Species of moth

Phyllocnistis tectonivora is a moth of the family Gracillariidae, known from Java, Indonesia. The hostplant for the species is Tectona grandis.
