= Phyllocnistis hagnopa =

Scientific classification
- Kingdom: Animalia
- Phylum: Arthropoda
- Class: Insecta
- Order: Lepidoptera
- Family: Gracillariidae
- Genus: Phyllocnistis
- Species: P. hagnopa

Binomial name
- Phyllocnistis hagnopa (Meyrick, 1920)

Species of moth

Phyllocnistis hagnopa is a moth of the family Gracillariidae, known from Tamil Nadu, India. The hostplant for the species is Ailanthus excelsa.
