= Phyllocnistis argentella =

Scientific classification
- Domain: Eukaryota
- Kingdom: Animalia
- Phylum: Arthropoda
- Class: Insecta
- Order: Lepidoptera
- Family: Gracillariidae
- Genus: Phyllocnistis
- Species: P. argentella

Binomial name
- Phyllocnistis argentella (Bradley, 1957)

Species of moth

Phyllocnistis argentella is a moth of the family Gracillariidae, known from Rennell Island in the Solomon Islands. It was described by J.D. Bradley in 1957, originally under the genus Opostega.
