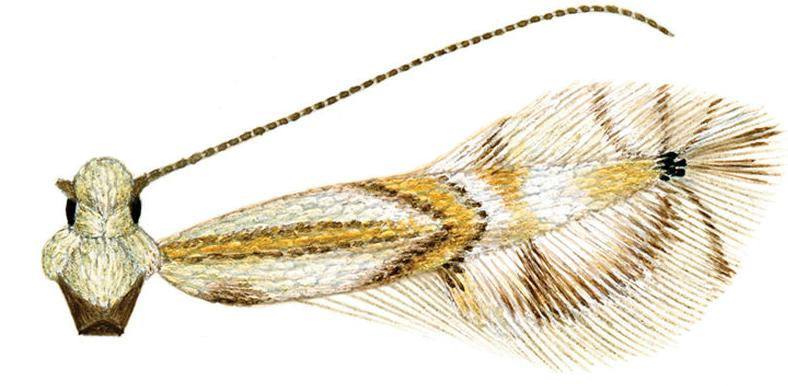

Scientific classification
- Kingdom: Animalia
- Phylum: Arthropoda
- Class: Insecta
- Order: Lepidoptera
- Family: Gracillariidae
- Genus: Phyllocnistis
- Species: P. hyperpersea

Binomial name
- Phyllocnistis hyperpersea Davis & Wagner, 2011

= Phyllocnistis hyperpersea =

Species of moth

Phyllocnistis hyperpersea is a moth of the family Gracillariidae. It is found from Nansemond and Virginia Beach Counties in Virginia, south along the lowland Atlantic coastal region to the Florida Everglades. It might have a much wider range, since material which might belong to this species has been recorded from Honduras and Mexico.

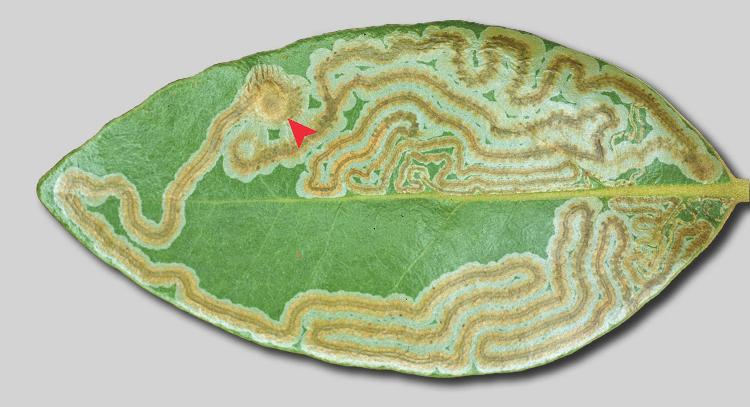
Mine

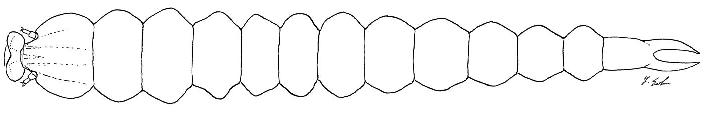
Larva

The length of the forewings is 1.9–2.2 mm. Adults have been recorded in September, December, February, March, April, May and June in southern Florida and in June in southern Virginia.

The larvae feed on Persea americana and Persea borbonia. They mine the leaves of their host plant. The mine has the form of a long, slender, serpentine gallery, with a relatively broad, dark brownish, median frass trail, almost always located on the upper (adaxial) side of the leaf. The egg is deposited on the upper leaf surface away from the midrib. Mines begin on one side of the blade, but after much of one side is consumed, cross over near the leaf apex to the other side. The median frass line is unusually broad for a species of Phyllocnistis, resembling more that of the Chilean genus Prophyllocnistis. Pupation occurs in the lamina, away from the leaf edge in a circular nidus, similar to that fashioned by Prophyllocnistis. The serpentine portion of the mine begins as a narrow tract of about 0.3 mm wide and gradually enlarges before the pupation chamber to a width of about 2–2.5 mm. The median frass line is one fourth of the mine width in the early instars and gradually broadens to more than half the mine width.

== Etymology ==
The specific name is derived from the Greek, hyper (meaning above, over) and the generic plant name of its host, Persea, in reference to the characteristic leafmining habit of the larva on the upperside of the leaf.
