= Phyllocnistis cassiella =

Scientific classification
- Kingdom: Animalia
- Phylum: Arthropoda
- Class: Insecta
- Order: Lepidoptera
- Family: Gracillariidae
- Genus: Phyllocnistis
- Species: P. cassiella

Binomial name
- Phyllocnistis cassiella Ghesquière, 1940

Species of moth

Phyllocnistis cassiella is a moth of the family Gracillariidae. It is known from Democratic Republic of Congo.

The larvae feed on Senna didymobotrya. They probably mine the leaves of their host plant.
