= Phyllocnistis embeliella =

Scientific classification
- Kingdom: Animalia
- Phylum: Arthropoda
- Class: Insecta
- Order: Lepidoptera
- Family: Gracillariidae
- Genus: Phyllocnistis
- Species: P. embeliella

Binomial name
- Phyllocnistis embeliella Liu & Zeng, 1989

Species of moth

Phyllocnistis embeliella is a moth of the family Gracillariidae, known from Guangdong, China. The host plant for the species is Embelia lacta.
