= Phyllocnistis aurilinea =

Scientific classification
- Kingdom: Animalia
- Phylum: Arthropoda
- Clade: Pancrustacea
- Class: Insecta
- Order: Lepidoptera
- Family: Gracillariidae
- Genus: Phyllocnistis
- Species: P. aurilinea

Binomial name
- Phyllocnistis aurilinea (Zeller, 1877)

Species of moth

Phyllocnistis aurilinea is a moth of the family Gracillariidae, known from Colombia. The hostplants for the species include Macleania rupestris and Cissampelos rhombifolia.
