= Phyllocnistis triortha =

Scientific classification
- Kingdom: Animalia
- Phylum: Arthropoda
- Clade: Pancrustacea
- Class: Insecta
- Order: Lepidoptera
- Family: Gracillariidae
- Genus: Phyllocnistis
- Species: P. triortha

Binomial name
- Phyllocnistis triortha Meyrick, 1906

Species of moth

Phyllocnistis triortha is a moth of the family Gracillariidae. It is known from Western Australia.
