= Phyllocnistis oxyopa =

Scientific classification
- Kingdom: Animalia
- Phylum: Arthropoda
- Clade: Pancrustacea
- Class: Insecta
- Order: Lepidoptera
- Family: Gracillariidae
- Genus: Phyllocnistis
- Species: P. oxyopa

Binomial name
- Phyllocnistis oxyopa (Meyrick, 1918)

Species of moth

Phyllocnistis oxyopa is a moth of the family Gracillariidae, known from Maharashtra, India. It was named by E. Meyrick in 1918.
