= Phyllocnistis lucernifera =

Scientific classification
- Kingdom: Animalia
- Phylum: Arthropoda
- Class: Insecta
- Order: Lepidoptera
- Family: Gracillariidae
- Genus: Phyllocnistis
- Species: P. lucernifera

Binomial name
- Phyllocnistis lucernifera (Meyrick, 1935)

Species of moth

Phyllocnistis lucernifera is a moth of the family Gracillariidae, known from Maharashtra, India. They mine the leaves of their host plant. The mine has the form of a wandering zigzag gallery on the under surface of the leaf.
