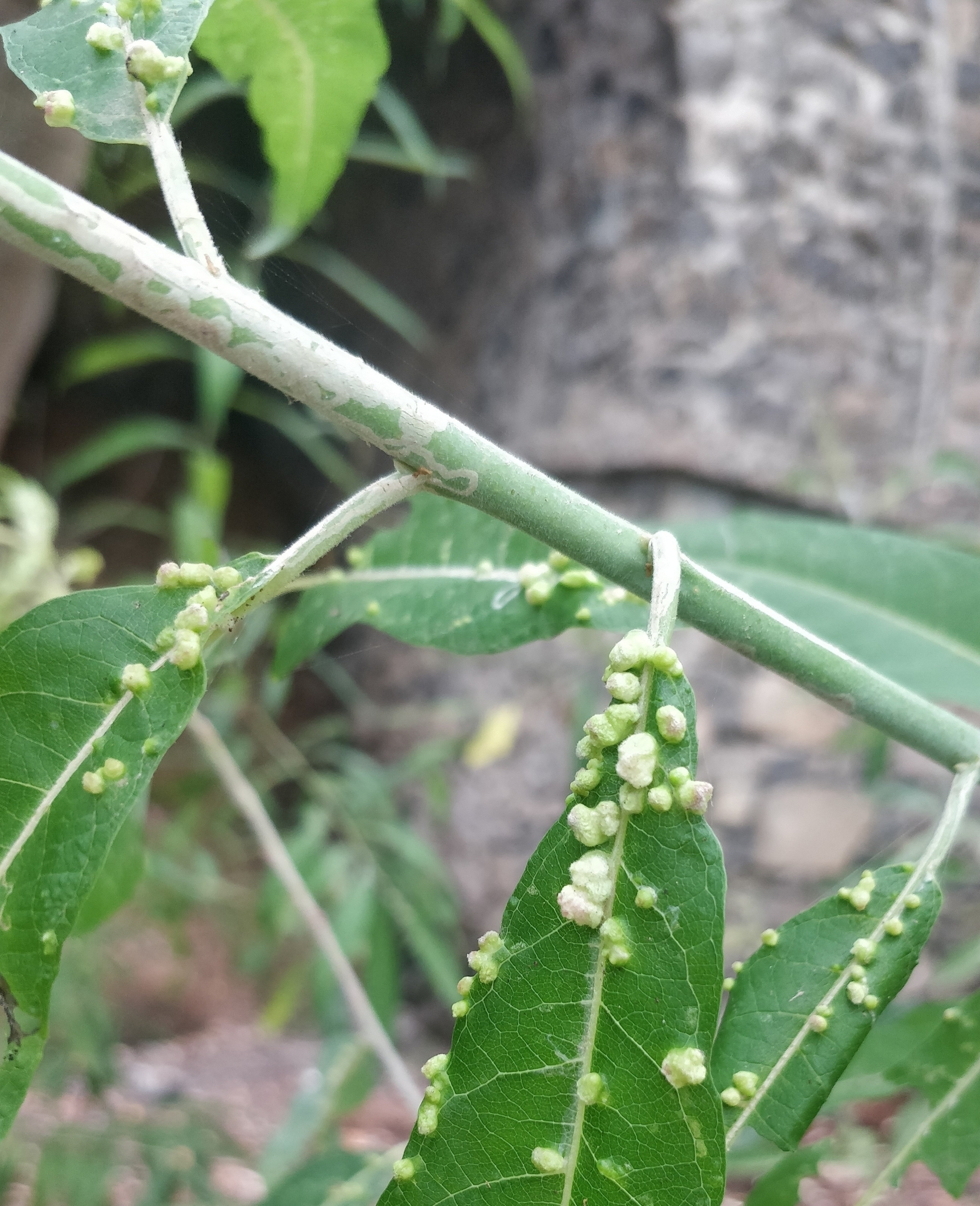
- Leaf galls caused by Phyllocnistis canariensis

Scientific classification
- Domain: Eukaryota
- Kingdom: Animalia
- Phylum: Arthropoda
- Class: Insecta
- Order: Lepidoptera
- Family: Gracillariidae
- Genus: Phyllocnistis
- Species: P. canariensis

Binomial name
- Phyllocnistis canariensis M. Hering, 1927

= Phyllocnistis canariensis =

Species of moth

Phyllocnistis canariensis is a species of moth in the family Gracillariidae. It is known from the Canary Islands and Madeira.

The larvae feed on Salix canariensis. They mine the stems and leaves of their host plant.
