= Phyllocnistis exaeta =

Scientific classification
- Kingdom: Animalia
- Phylum: Arthropoda
- Class: Insecta
- Order: Lepidoptera
- Family: Gracillariidae
- Genus: Phyllocnistis
- Species: P. exaeta

Binomial name
- Phyllocnistis exaeta (Meyrick, 1926)

Species of moth

Phyllocnistis exaeta is a moth of the family Gracillariidae, known from Assam, India. It was named by E. Meyrick in 1926.
