= Phyllocnistis baccharidis =

Scientific classification
- Domain: Eukaryota
- Kingdom: Animalia
- Phylum: Arthropoda
- Class: Insecta
- Order: Lepidoptera
- Family: Gracillariidae
- Genus: Phyllocnistis
- Species: P. baccharidis

Binomial name
- Phyllocnistis baccharidis E. M. Hering, 1958

Species of moth

Phyllocnistis baccharidis is a moth of the family Gracillariidae, known from Argentina. The hostplant for the species is an unidentified species of Baccharis.
