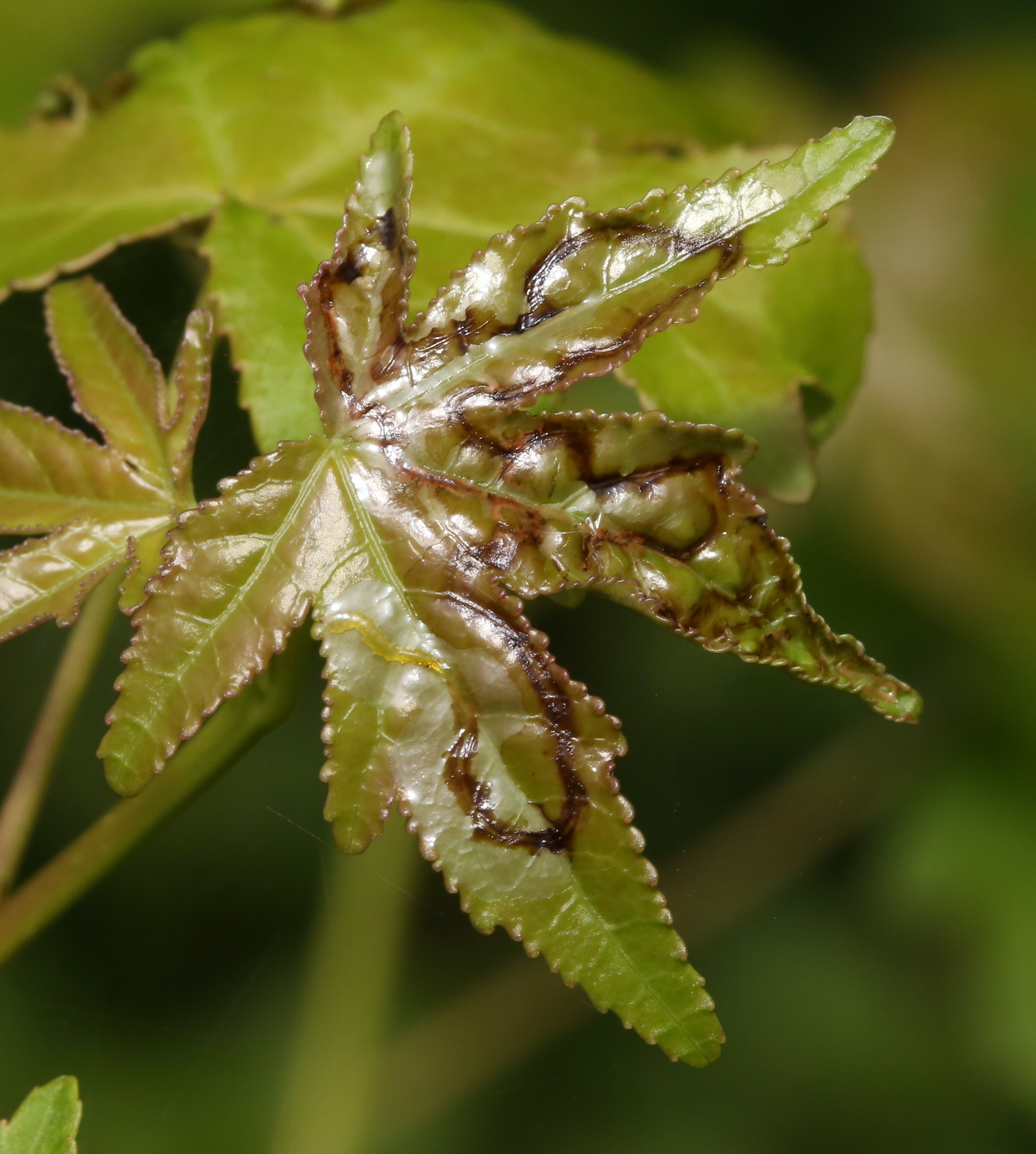
- Leaf mine on sweetgum

Scientific classification
- Kingdom: Animalia
- Phylum: Arthropoda
- Clade: Pancrustacea
- Class: Insecta
- Order: Lepidoptera
- Family: Gracillariidae
- Genus: Phyllocnistis
- Species: P. liquidambarisella

Binomial name
- Phyllocnistis liquidambarisella (Chambers, 1875)

= Phyllocnistis liquidambarisella =

Species of moth

Phyllocnistis liquidambarisella is a moth of the family Gracillariidae, known from the United States (New York, Maryland, Kentucky, Georgia, Texas, Florida). The hostplant for the species is Liquidambar styraciflua. They mine the leaves of their host plant. The mine has the form of a long, winding, linear mine on the upperside of the leaf. It is rather indistinct, without any central line of frass.
