= Phyllocnistis puyehuensis =

Scientific classification
- Kingdom: Animalia
- Phylum: Arthropoda
- Class: Insecta
- Order: Lepidoptera
- Family: Gracillariidae
- Genus: Phyllocnistis
- Species: P. puyehuensis

Binomial name
- Phyllocnistis puyehuensis (Davis, 1994)

Species of moth

Phyllocnistis puyehuensis is a moth of the family Gracillariidae, known from Chile. It was named by D.R. Davis in 1994.
