= Phyllocnistis selenopa =

Scientific classification
- Kingdom: Animalia
- Phylum: Arthropoda
- Class: Insecta
- Order: Lepidoptera
- Family: Gracillariidae
- Genus: Phyllocnistis
- Species: P. selenopa

Binomial name
- Phyllocnistis selenopa (Meyrick, 1915)

Species of moth

Phyllocnistis selenopa is a moth of the family Gracillariidae, known from Guadalcanal, in the Solomon Islands, as well as India and Sri Lanka. The hostplant for the species is Melia azedarach.
