= Phyllocnistis atranota =

Scientific classification
- Kingdom: Animalia
- Phylum: Arthropoda
- Clade: Pancrustacea
- Class: Insecta
- Order: Lepidoptera
- Family: Gracillariidae
- Genus: Phyllocnistis
- Species: P. atranota

Binomial name
- Phyllocnistis atranota Meyrick, 1906

Species of moth

Phyllocnistis atranota is a moth of the family Gracillariidae. It is known from New South Wales, Australia.

The wingspan is about 5 mm.

The larvae feed on Alphitonia excelsa. They probably mine the leaves of their host plant.
