= Phyllocnistis voutei =

Scientific classification
- Kingdom: Animalia
- Phylum: Arthropoda
- Class: Insecta
- Order: Lepidoptera
- Family: Gracillariidae
- Genus: Phyllocnistis
- Species: P. voutei

Binomial name
- Phyllocnistis voutei (M. Hering, 1932)

Species of moth

Phyllocnistis voutei is a moth of the family Gracillariidae, known from Java, Indonesia.

The hostplant for the species is an unidentified species of Loranthus. They mine the leaves of their host plant. The mine is located on the underside of the leaf surface.
