= Phyllocnistis hapalodes =

Scientific classification
- Kingdom: Animalia
- Phylum: Arthropoda
- Clade: Pancrustacea
- Class: Insecta
- Order: Lepidoptera
- Family: Gracillariidae
- Genus: Phyllocnistis
- Species: P. hapalodes

Binomial name
- Phyllocnistis hapalodes Meyrick, 1906

Species of moth

Phyllocnistis hapalodes is a moth of the family Gracillariidae. It is known from Western Australia.
