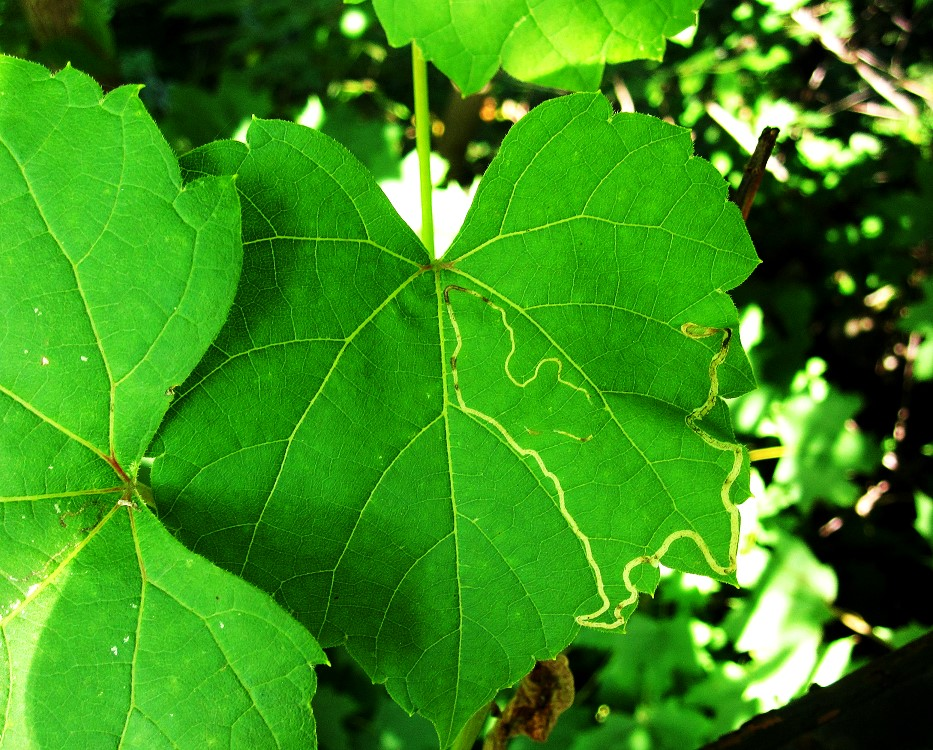
- Leafmine in frost grape (Vitis vulpina) caused by Phyllocnistis vitifoliella

Scientific classification
- Kingdom: Animalia
- Phylum: Arthropoda
- Clade: Pancrustacea
- Class: Insecta
- Order: Lepidoptera
- Family: Gracillariidae
- Genus: Phyllocnistis
- Species: P. vitifoliella

Binomial name
- Phyllocnistis vitifoliella (Chambers, 1871)

= Phyllocnistis vitifoliella =

Species of moth

Phyllocnistis vitifoliella is a moth of the family Gracillariidae, known from Québec and the United States (where it has been recorded from Wisconsin, California, Florida, Georgia, Maryland, Michigan, New York, Texas, Vermont, Kentucky and Illinois).
