= Phyllocnistis habrochroa =

Scientific classification
- Kingdom: Animalia
- Phylum: Arthropoda
- Class: Insecta
- Order: Lepidoptera
- Family: Gracillariidae
- Genus: Phyllocnistis
- Species: P. habrochroa

Binomial name
- Phyllocnistis habrochroa (Meyrick, 1915)

Species of moth

Phyllocnistis habrochroa is a moth of the family Gracillariidae, known from Karnataka, India. The hostplant for the species is Abatia stellata. It was named by E. Meyrick in 1915.
