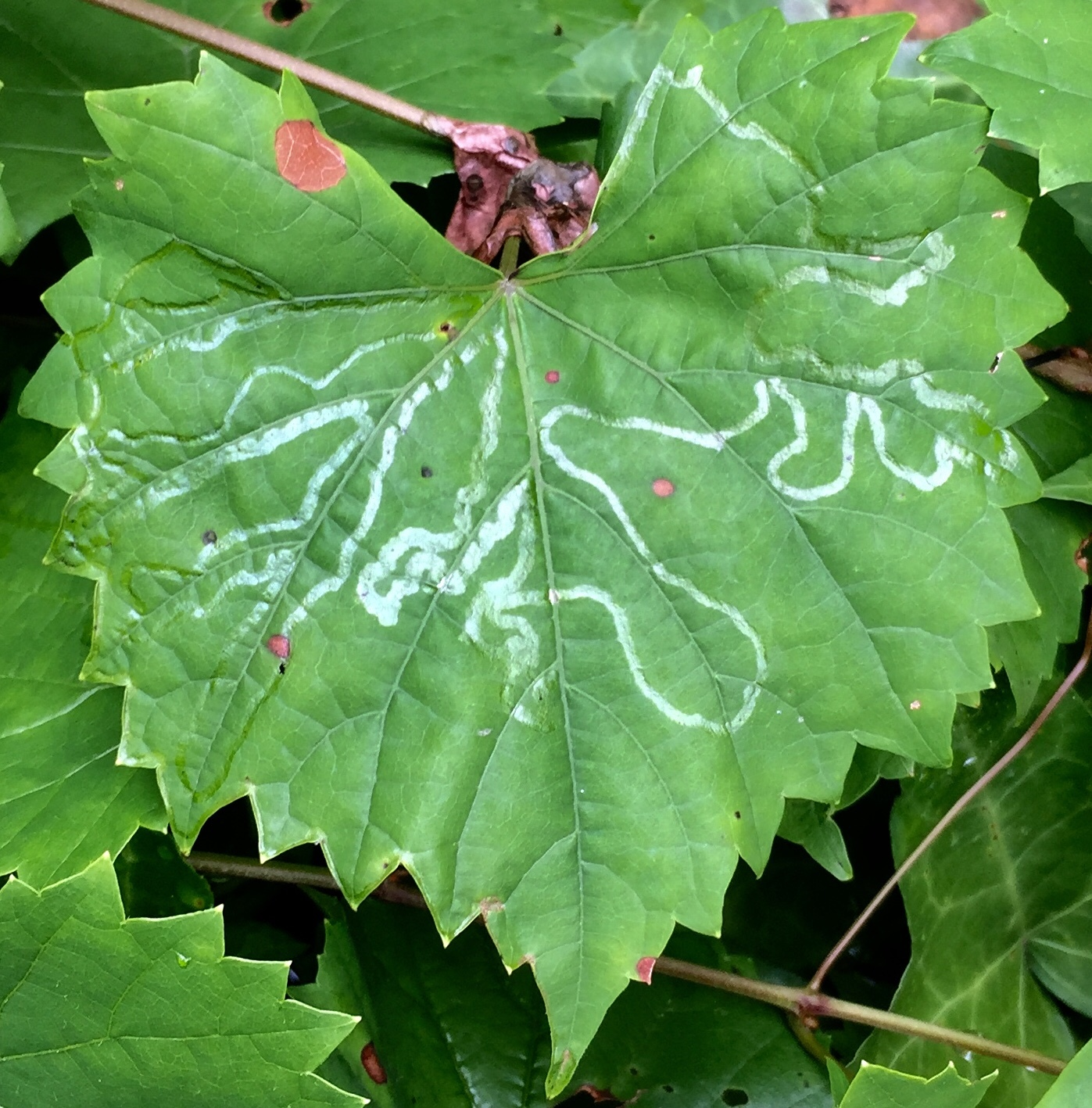
- Leaf mines caused by Phyllocnistis vitegenella larvae

Scientific classification
- Kingdom: Animalia
- Phylum: Arthropoda
- Clade: Pancrustacea
- Class: Insecta
- Order: Lepidoptera
- Family: Gracillariidae
- Genus: Phyllocnistis
- Species: P. vitegenella

Binomial name
- Phyllocnistis vitegenella Clemens, 1859

Synonyms
- Phyllocnistis vitigenella Clemens, 1860 (Unj. Emend.)

= Phyllocnistis vitegenella =

Species of moth

Phyllocnistis vitegenella is a moth of the family Gracillariidae. It is native to North America, but has been recorded from northern Italy in 1994, Slovenia in 2004 and Switzerland in 2009.

The larvae feed on American native species of Vitis and it has become a pest of the cultivated Vitis vinifera. They mine the leaves of their host plants.
