= Phyllocnistis argothea =

Scientific classification
- Kingdom: Animalia
- Phylum: Arthropoda
- Class: Insecta
- Order: Lepidoptera
- Family: Gracillariidae
- Genus: Phyllocnistis
- Species: P. argothea

Binomial name
- Phyllocnistis argothea (Meyrick, 1933)

Species of moth

Phyllocnistis argothea is a moth of the family Gracillariidae, known from Bihar, India. The hostplant for the species is Drypetes roxburghii.
