= Phyllocnistis cirrhophanes =

Scientific classification
- Kingdom: Animalia
- Phylum: Arthropoda
- Class: Insecta
- Order: Lepidoptera
- Family: Gracillariidae
- Genus: Phyllocnistis
- Species: P. cirrhophanes

Binomial name
- Phyllocnistis cirrhophanes (Meyrick, 1915)

Species of moth

Phyllocnistis cirrhophanes is a moth of the family Gracillariidae, known from Karnataka, India.

The hostplant for the species is Alseodaphne semecarpifolia. They mine the leaves of their host plant. The mine starts as a spiral. Later, it becomes an undulating gallery under the upper cuticle of the leaf, always confined to the edge of the leaf and producing blackish discolouration.
