= Phyllocnistis pharetrucha =

Scientific classification
- Kingdom: Animalia
- Phylum: Arthropoda
- Class: Insecta
- Order: Lepidoptera
- Family: Gracillariidae
- Genus: Phyllocnistis
- Species: P. pharetrucha

Binomial name
- Phyllocnistis pharetrucha Meyrick, 1921

Species of moth

Phyllocnistis pharetrucha is a moth of the family Gracillariidae. It is known from South Africa.
