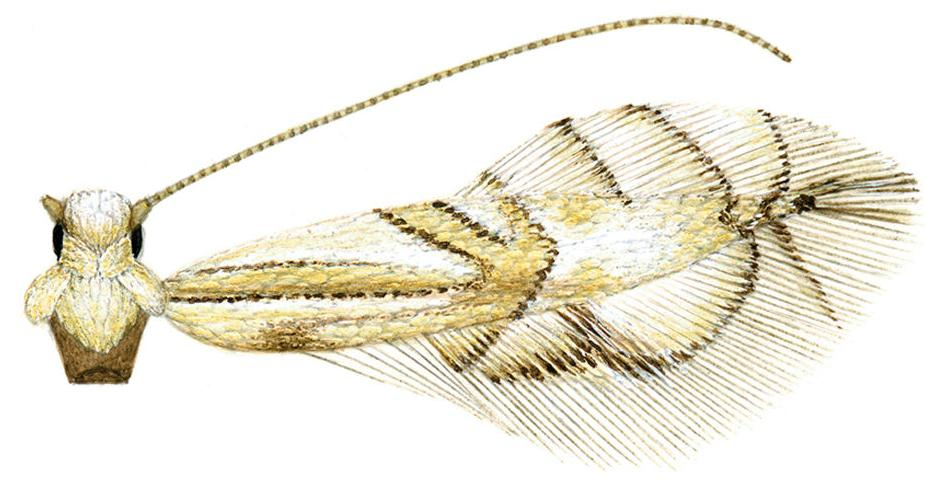

Scientific classification
- Kingdom: Animalia
- Phylum: Arthropoda
- Class: Insecta
- Order: Lepidoptera
- Family: Gracillariidae
- Genus: Phyllocnistis
- Species: P. subpersea

Binomial name
- Phyllocnistis subpersea Davis and Wagner, 2011

= Phyllocnistis subpersea =

Species of moth

Phyllocnistis subpersea is a moth of the family Gracillariidae. It is found in the Dade and Monroe Counties of Florida. Mines of what appear to be this species have been found as far north as the Green Swamp in coastal South Carolina.

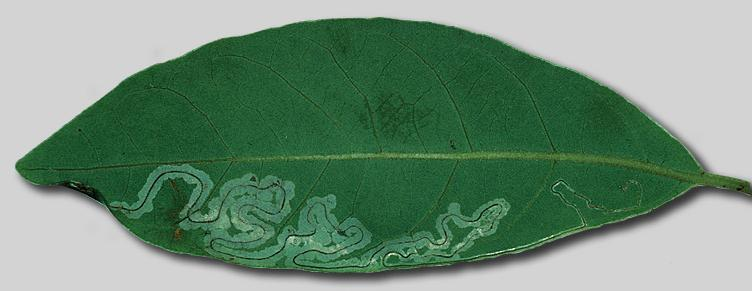
Mine

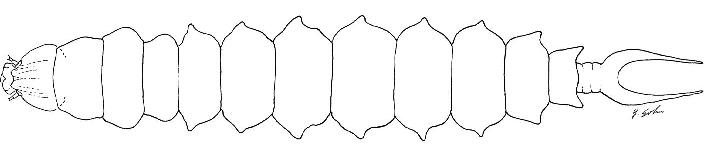
Larva

The length of the forewings is 2-2.7 mm. Adults have been recorded from February to April in Florida.

The larvae feed on Persea borbonia. They mine the leaves of their host plant. The mine has the form of a long, slender, serpentine gallery, containing a dark, median frass trail, on the underside or occasionally the upperside of the leaf, with pupation occurring in a slightly enlarged, elliptical chamber at the mine terminus along a leaf edge. The egg is deposited away from the midrib, usually on the lower side of the leaf. Mine width increases from about 0.3 mm broad to a maximum width of about 2–2.5 mm. The width of the frass trail is usually about half the mine width. Early instars of the larvae have a highly modified, depressed body for sapfeeding. The final instar is non-feeding, with all mouthparts reduced or absent except for functional spinneret.

== Etymology ==
The specific name is derived from the Greek sub (meaning under) and the generic plant name of its host, Persea, in reference to the characteristic leafmining habit of the larva usually on the underside of the leaf.
