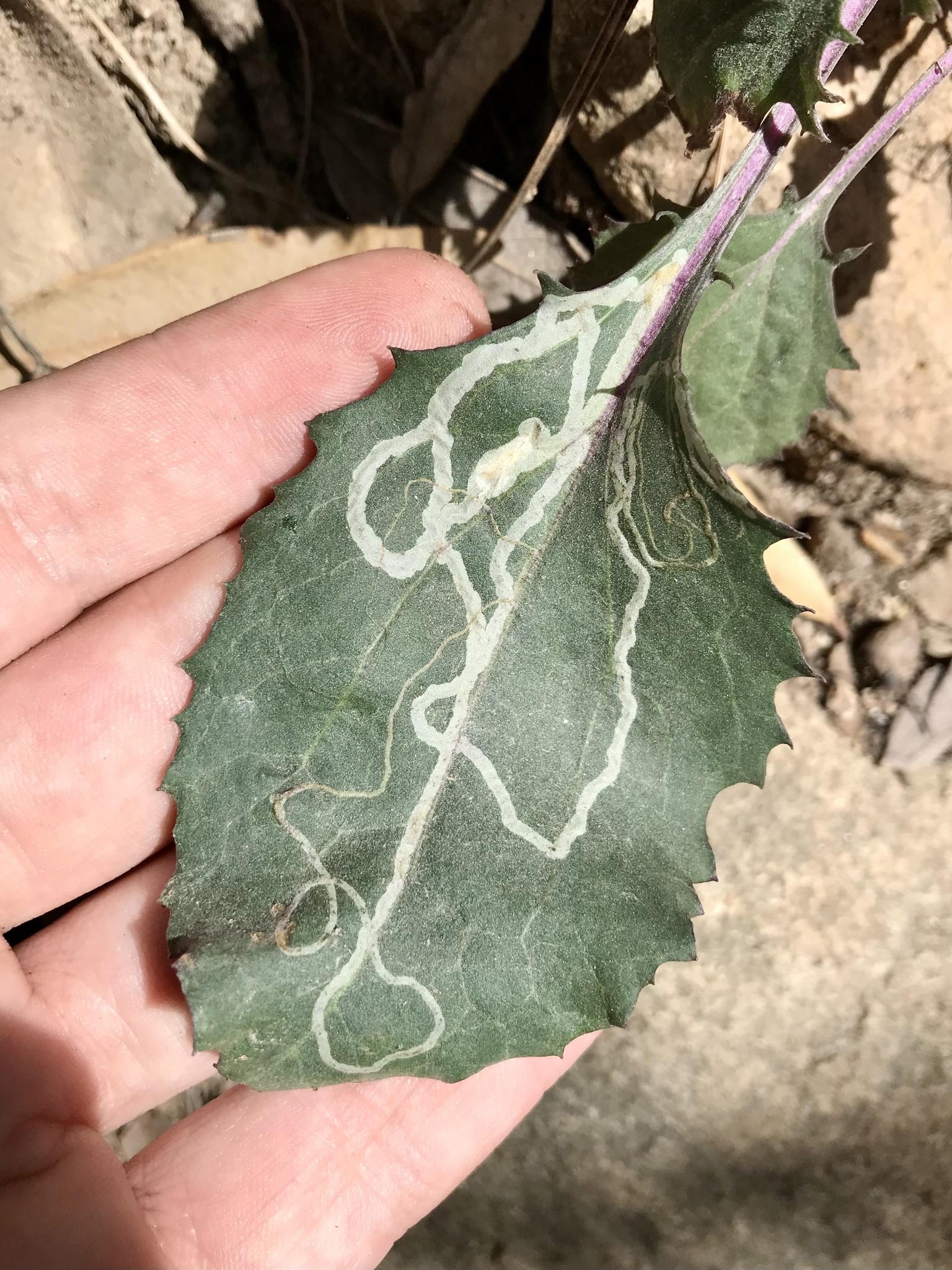
- Leaf mines made by Phyllocnistis finitima

Scientific classification
- Kingdom: Animalia
- Phylum: Arthropoda
- Clade: Pancrustacea
- Class: Insecta
- Order: Lepidoptera
- Family: Gracillariidae
- Genus: Phyllocnistis
- Species: P. finitima

Binomial name
- Phyllocnistis finitima (Braun, 1927)

= Phyllocnistis finitima =

Species of moth

Phyllocnistis finitima is a species of moth in the family Gracillariidae, known from the south-western U.S. (Arizona) The hostplant is Senecio cruentus.
