= Phyllocnistis sciophanta =

Scientific classification
- Kingdom: Animalia
- Phylum: Arthropoda
- Clade: Pancrustacea
- Class: Insecta
- Order: Lepidoptera
- Family: Gracillariidae
- Genus: Phyllocnistis
- Species: P. sciophanta

Binomial name
- Phyllocnistis sciophanta (Meyrick, 1915)

Species of moth

Phyllocnistis sciophanta is a moth of the family Gracillariidae, known from Peru. It was described by E. Meyrick in 1915.
