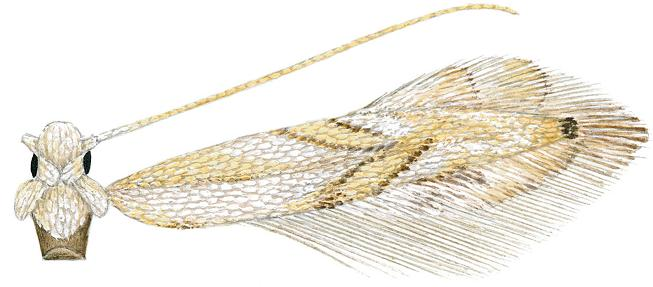

Scientific classification
- Kingdom: Animalia
- Phylum: Arthropoda
- Class: Insecta
- Order: Lepidoptera
- Family: Gracillariidae
- Genus: Phyllocnistis
- Species: P. perseafolia

Binomial name
- Phyllocnistis perseafolia Davis and Wagner, 2011

= Phyllocnistis perseafolia =

Species of moth

Phyllocnistis perseafolia is a moth of the family Gracillariidae. It is known only from the type locality in the Department of Caldas, west-central Colombia, but probably widespread over northern South America wherever avocado is cultivated.

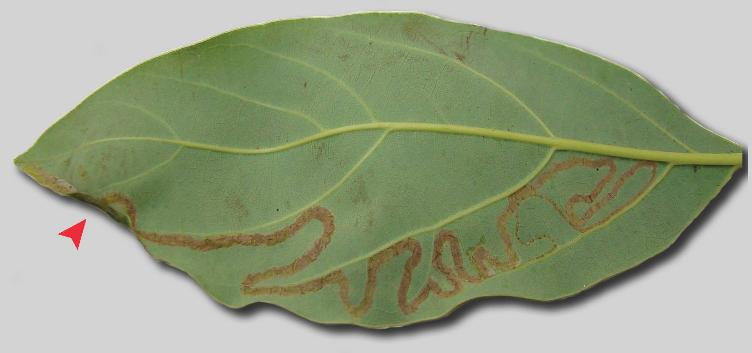
Mine

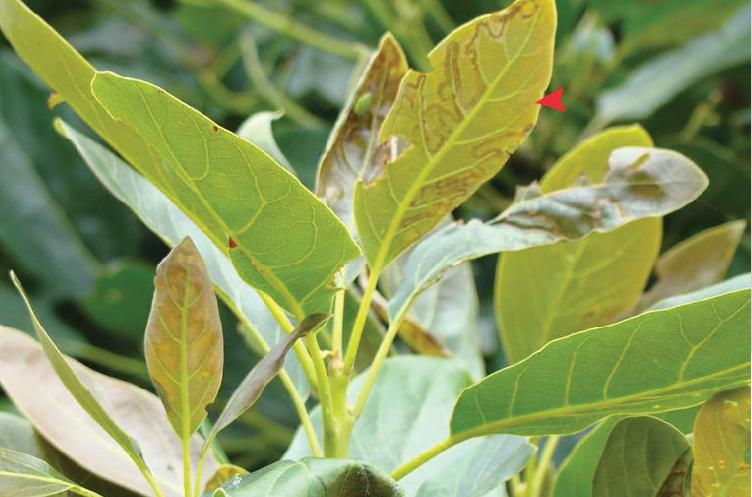
Location of the mine

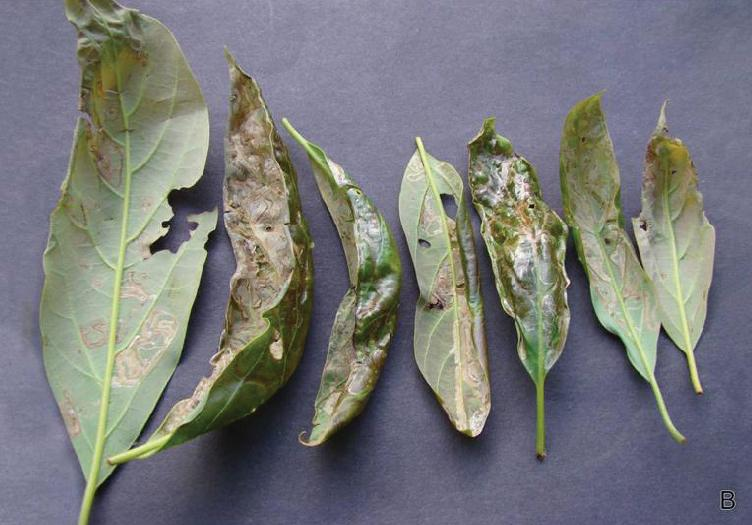
Damage

The length of the forewings is 2.6–3.2 mm. Adults have been recorded in April in Colombia.

The larvae feed on Persea americana. Serpentine mines of possibly this species have also been observed on avocado fruit. They mine the leaves of their host plant. The mine has the form of a long, slender, serpentine gallery, containing a dark, narrow, median frass trail, present on either the underside or upperside of the leaf, with pupation occurring in a slightly enlarged, elliptical chamber at the mine terminus along the leaf edge.

== Etymology ==
The specific name is derived from the generic plant name of its host, Persea and the Latin folium (meaning leaf), in reference to its leafmining habit.
