= Phyllocnistis endoxa =

Scientific classification
- Kingdom: Animalia
- Phylum: Arthropoda
- Class: Insecta
- Order: Lepidoptera
- Family: Gracillariidae
- Genus: Phyllocnistis
- Species: P. endoxa

Binomial name
- Phyllocnistis endoxa (Meyrick, 1926)

Species of moth

Phyllocnistis endoxa is a moth of the family Gracillariidae, found in Maharashtra and Karnataka, India. The host plant for the species is Aporosa lindleyana.
