= Phyllocnistis minimella =

Scientific classification
- Kingdom: Animalia
- Phylum: Arthropoda
- Class: Insecta
- Order: Lepidoptera
- Family: Gracillariidae
- Genus: Phyllocnistis
- Species: P. minimella

Binomial name
- Phyllocnistis minimella van Deventer, 1904

Species of moth

Phyllocnistis minimella is a moth of the family Gracillariidae, known from Java, Indonesia. The hostplant for the species is Protium javanicum.
