= Phyllocnistis diaugella =

Scientific classification
- Kingdom: Animalia
- Phylum: Arthropoda
- Clade: Pancrustacea
- Class: Insecta
- Order: Lepidoptera
- Family: Gracillariidae
- Genus: Phyllocnistis
- Species: P. diaugella

Binomial name
- Phyllocnistis diaugella Meyrick, 1880

Species of moth

Phyllocnistis diaugella is a moth of the family Gracillariidae. It is known from New South Wales and Queensland in Australia.

The larvae feed on Breynia species (including Breynia oblongifolia) and Euphorbia sparrmannii, and mine the leaves of their host plant.
