= Phyllocnistis nepenthae =

Scientific classification
- Kingdom: Animalia
- Phylum: Arthropoda
- Class: Insecta
- Order: Lepidoptera
- Family: Gracillariidae
- Genus: Phyllocnistis
- Species: P. nepenthae

Binomial name
- Phyllocnistis nepenthae (M. Hering, 1931)

Species of moth

Phyllocnistis nepenthae is a moth of the family Gracillariidae, known from Sumatra, Indonesia. The hostplant for the species is Nepenthes tobaica.
