= Phyllocnistis wampella =

Scientific classification
- Kingdom: Animalia
- Phylum: Arthropoda
- Class: Insecta
- Order: Lepidoptera
- Family: Gracillariidae
- Genus: Phyllocnistis
- Species: P. wampella

Binomial name
- Phyllocnistis wampella Liu & Zeng, 1985

Synonyms
- Phyllocnistis wempella Du, 1989

Species of moth

Phyllocnistis wampella is a moth of the family Gracillariidae, known from Guangdong, China. The hostplant for the species is Clausena lansium.
