= Phyllocnistis titania =

Scientific classification
- Kingdom: Animalia
- Phylum: Arthropoda
- Class: Insecta
- Order: Lepidoptera
- Family: Gracillariidae
- Genus: Phyllocnistis
- Species: P. titania

Binomial name
- Phyllocnistis titania (Meyrick, 1928)

Species of moth

Phyllocnistis titania is a moth of the family Gracillariidae, known from Sumatra, Indonesia. The hostplant for the species is Premna tomentosa.
