= Phyllocnistis atractias =

Scientific classification
- Kingdom: Animalia
- Phylum: Arthropoda
- Clade: Pancrustacea
- Class: Insecta
- Order: Lepidoptera
- Family: Gracillariidae
- Genus: Phyllocnistis
- Species: P. atractias

Binomial name
- Phyllocnistis atractias Meyrick, 1906

Species of moth

Phyllocnistis atractias is a moth of the family Gracillariidae. It is known from New South Wales and Queensland in Australia.
