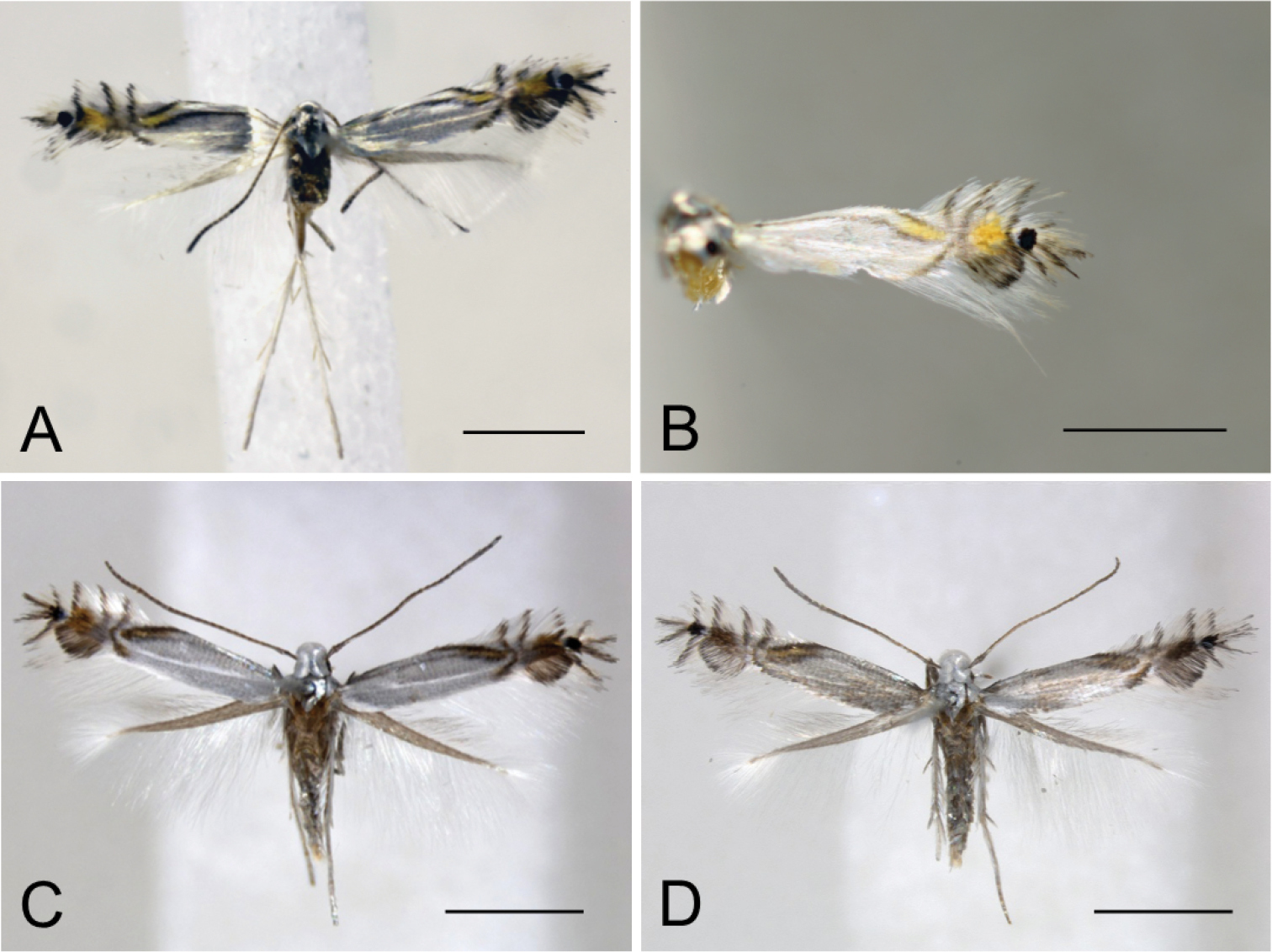

Scientific classification
- Kingdom: Animalia
- Phylum: Arthropoda
- Clade: Pancrustacea
- Class: Insecta
- Order: Lepidoptera
- Family: Gracillariidae
- Genus: Phyllocnistis
- Species: P. cornella

Binomial name
- Phyllocnistis cornella (Ermolaev, 1987)

= Phyllocnistis cornella =

Species of moth

Phyllocnistis cornella is a moth of the family Gracillariidae, known from the Kuril Islands, Kunashir, Russia. The hostplant for the species is Cornus controversa.
