= Phyllocnistis synglypta =

Scientific classification
- Kingdom: Animalia
- Phylum: Arthropoda
- Class: Insecta
- Order: Lepidoptera
- Family: Gracillariidae
- Genus: Phyllocnistis
- Species: P. synglypta

Binomial name
- Phyllocnistis synglypta (Meyrick, 1918)

Species of moth

Phyllocnistis synglypta is a moth of the family Gracillariidae, known from Maharashtra and Karnataka, India, as well as Malaysia.

The hostplants for the species include Terminalia catappa and Terminalia tomentosa. They mine the leaves of their host plant. The mine has the form of an irregular gallery on either side of the leaf.
