= Phyllocnistis magnatella =

Scientific classification
- Kingdom: Animalia
- Phylum: Arthropoda
- Clade: Pancrustacea
- Class: Insecta
- Order: Lepidoptera
- Family: Gracillariidae
- Genus: Phyllocnistis
- Species: P. magnatella

Binomial name
- Phyllocnistis magnatella (Zeller, 1873)

Species of moth

Phyllocnistis magnatella is a moth of the family Gracillariidae, known from Massachusetts, U.S.A. It was named by P.C. Zeller in 1873.
