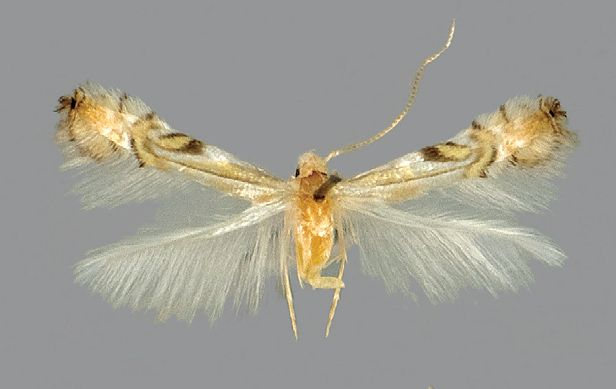
- Phyllocnistis maxberryi

Scientific classification
- Kingdom: Animalia
- Phylum: Arthropoda
- Clade: Pancrustacea
- Class: Insecta
- Order: Lepidoptera
- Family: Gracillariidae
- Subfamily: Phyllocnistinae
- Genus: Phyllocnistis; Zeller, 1848

Species
- See text

= Phyllocnistis =

Genus of moths

Phyllocnistis is a genus of moths in the family Gracillariidae.

== Description ==
=== Adult ===
Adults of the genus Phyllocnistis are very small moths with wingspans generally not exceeding 5 mm. Both fore- and hindwings are lanceolate and predominantly white. The forewings are marked with yellow to orange, longitudinal and oblique striae, often bordered by gray or black. A few species are known to possess much darker or strikingly color patterns. The compound eyes of Phyllocnistis are reduced, with an interocular index (vertical eye diameter/minimum interocular distance) of approximately 0.9. The maxillary palpi are the most reduced among Gracillariidae, being barely evident as vestigial, non-segmented lobes at the base of the elongate proboscis. The wing venation is also reduced.

=== Larvae ===
The larvae of Phyllocnistis are among the most specialized Lepidoptera. Four instars appear to be the norm, with the first three instars possessing a sapfeeding morphology and behavior. Sapfeeding instars create a long serpentine, subepidermal mine on either the upper or lower surfaces of the host leaf. A few species also form subepidermal mines on stems and various fruits, including avocado. A characteristic, median frass trail extends the length of the mine, usually as a dark, unbroken line. The fourth instar is a highly specialized, apodal, non-feeding instar whose primary function is to spin the cocoon, at the mine terminus, prior to pupation.

=== Pupae ===
In contrast to the conservative morphology of the larval and adult stages, the pupae of Phyllocnistis are structurally diverse, particularly with regard to the development of the frontal process (cocoon-cutter) of the head. In addition, the mid-dorsal areas of abdominal terga 3–7 possess a mostly symmetrical cluster of recurved spines that frequently differ in their arrangement and form among species.

== Ecology ==
Phyllocnistis can be found on many host plants, and have been noted on plants from at least 20 families. One well-known species is the citrus leafminer (Phyllocnistis citrella), a pest of plants in the family Rutaceae, especially citrus.

== Species ==
As of 2012, about 126 Phyllocnistis species have been described. This is probably a fraction of the true diversity of the genus, especially in the tropics, where there may be hundreds of species yet to be collected.

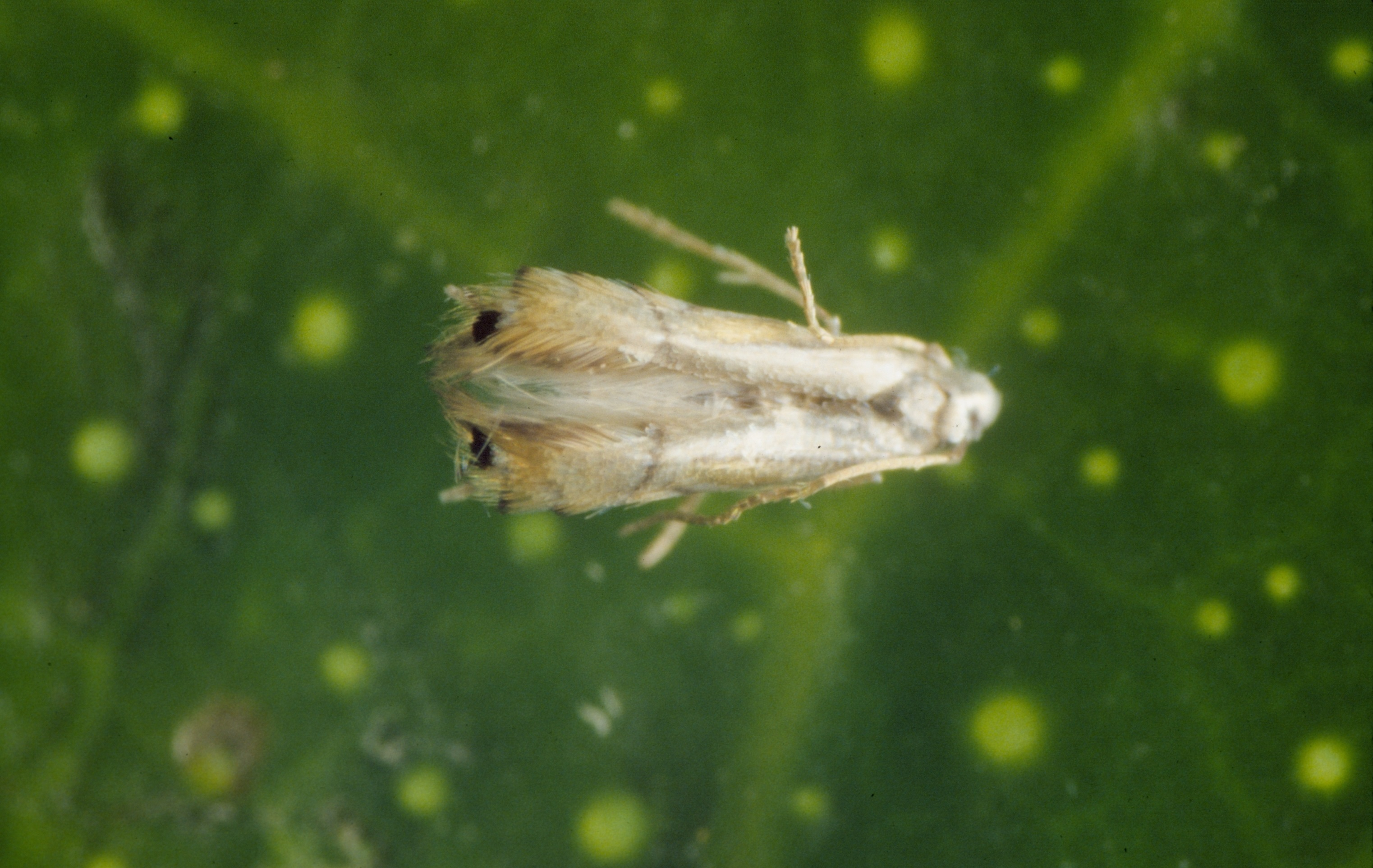
Phyllocnistis citrella

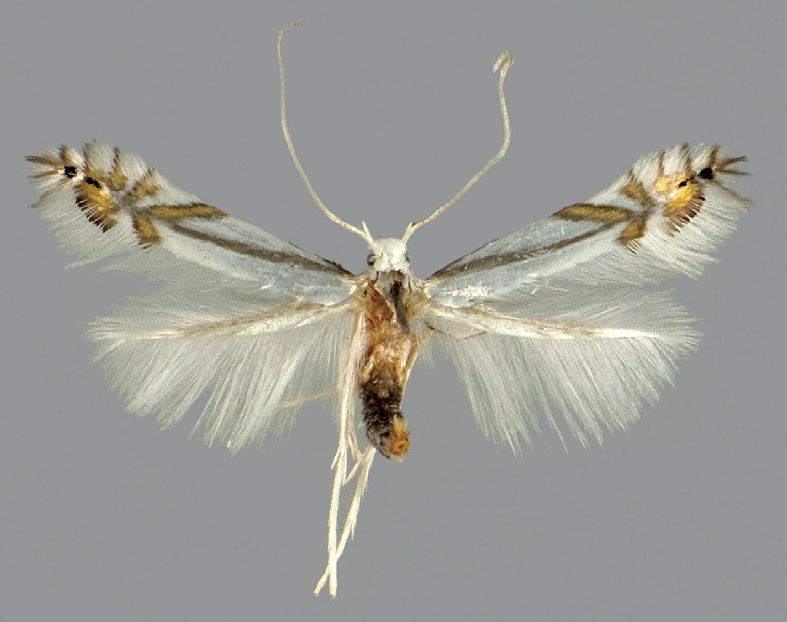
Phyllocnistis tropaeolicola

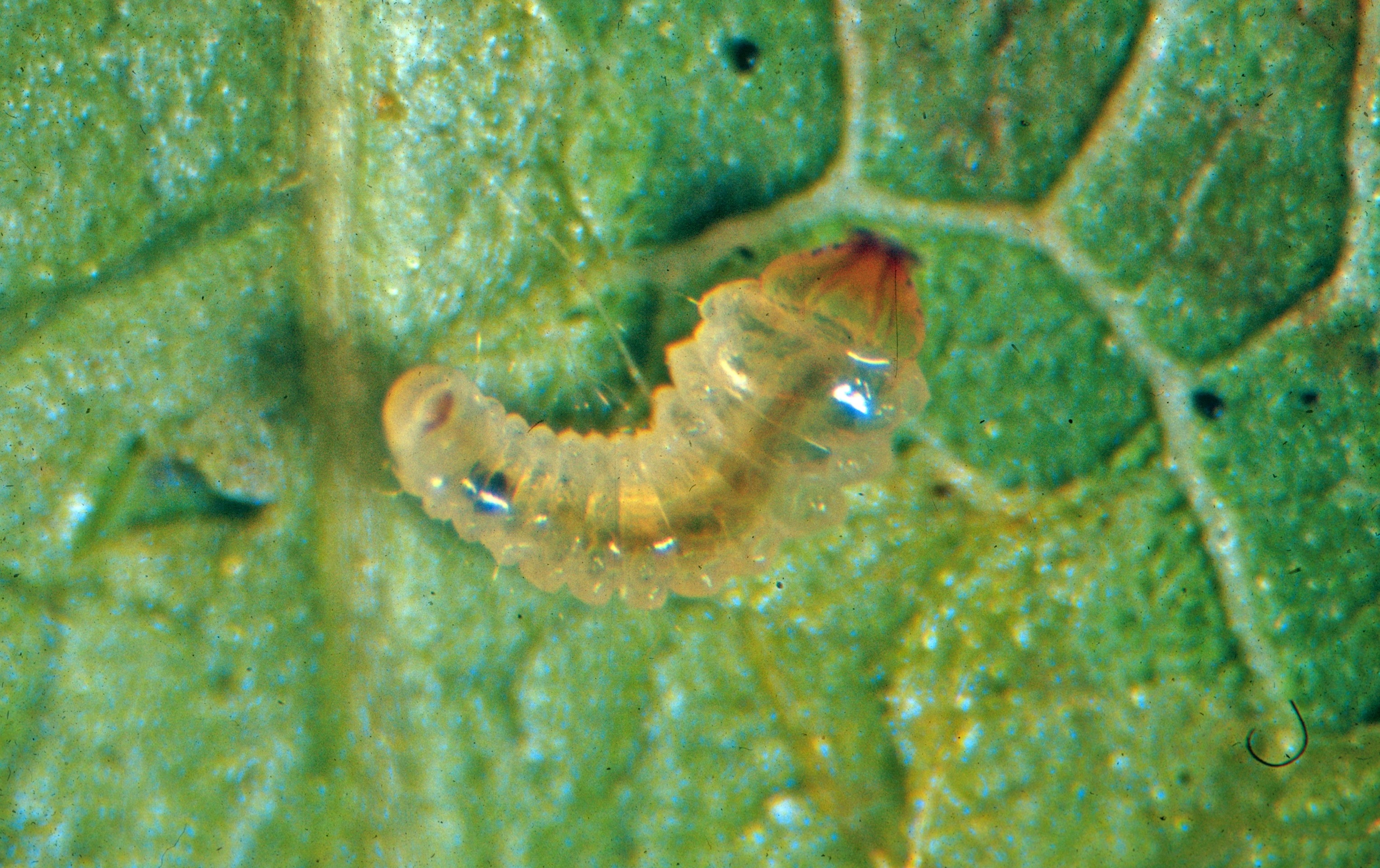
Phyllocnistis populiella larva

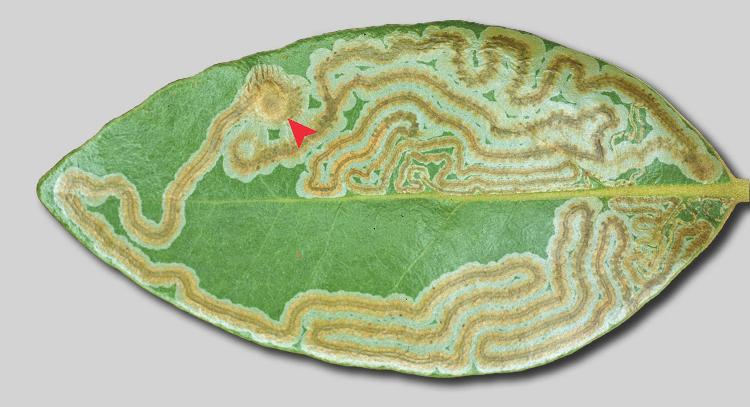
Phyllocnistis hyperpersea leaf mine

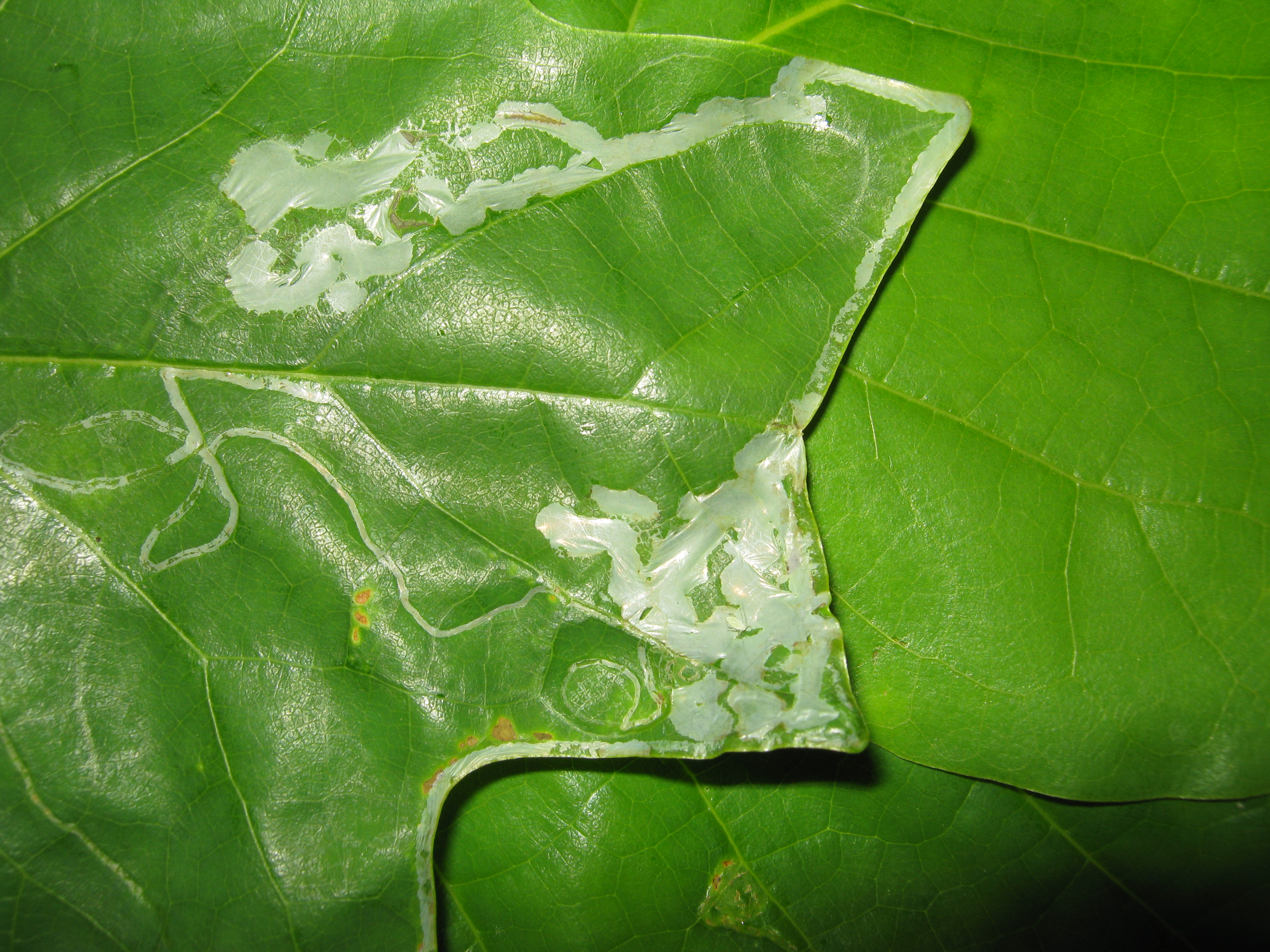
Phyllocnistis liriodendronella leaf mines on Liriodendron

- P. abatiae E. M. Hering, 1958
- P. acmias Meyrick, 1906
- P. ampelopsiella Chambers, 1871
- P. amydropa Meyrick, 1934
- P. argentella (Bradley, 1957)
- P. argothea Meyrick, 1933
- P. atractias Meyrick, 1906
- P. atranota Meyrick, 1906
- P. aurilinea Zeller, 1877
- P. baccharidis E. M. Hering, 1958
- P. bourquini Pastrana, 1960
- P. breynilla Liu & Zeng, 1989
- P. canariensis M. Hering, 1927
- P. cassiella Ghesquière, 1940
- P. chlorantica Seksyaeva, 1992
- P. chrysophthalma Meyrick, 1915
- P. cirrhophanes Meyrick, 1915
- P. citrella Stainton, 1856
- P. citronympha Meyrick, 1926
- P. cornella Ermolaev, 1987
- P. diaugella Meyrick, 1880
- P. dichotoma Turner, 1947
- P. diplomochla Turner, 1923
- P. dorcas Meyrick, 1915
- P. drimiphaga Kawahara, Nishida & Davis, 2009
- P. echinodes Meyrick, 1926
- P. embeliella Liu & Zeng, 1989
- P. endoxa Meyrick, 1926
- P. ephimera Turner, 1926
- P. eurymochla Turner, 1923
- P. exaeta Meyrick, 1926
- P. exiguella van Deventer, 1904
- P. extrematrix Martynova, 1955
- P. finitima Braun, 1927
- P. habrochroa Meyrick, 1915
- P. hagnopa Meyrick, 1920
- P. hapalodes Meyrick, 1906
- P. helicodes Meyrick, 1916
- P. humiliella van Deventer, 1904
- P. hyperbolacma (Meyrick, 1931)
- P. hyperpersea Davis and Wagner, 2011
- P. insignis Frey & Boll, 1876
- P. intermediella Busck, 1900
- P. iodocella Meyrick, 1880
- P. labyrinthella (Bjerkander, 1790)
- P. leptomianta Turner, 1923
- P. liquidambarisella Chambers, 1875
- P. liriodendronella Clemens, 1863
- P. longipalpa Davis and Wagner, 2011
- P. loxosticha Bradley, 1965
- P. lucernifera Meyrick, 1935
- P. magnatella Zeller, 1873
- P. magnoliella Chambers, 1878
- P. maxberryi Kawahara, Nishida & Davis, 2009
- P. meliacella Becker, 1974
- P. micrographa Meyrick, 1916
- P. minimella van Deventer, 1904
- P. nepenthae M. Hering, 1931
- P. nymphidia Turner, 1947
- P. oxyopa Meyrick, 1918
- P. perseafolia Davis and Wagner, 2011
- P. pharetrucha Meyrick, 1921
- P. phrixopa Meyrick, 1926
- P. populiella Chambers, 1875
- P. psychina Meyrick, 1906
- P. puyehuensis Davis, 1994
- P. ramulicola Langmaid & Corley, 2007
- P. rotans Meyrick, 1915
- P. saligna (Zeller, 1839)
- P. sciophanta Meyrick, 1915
- P. selenopa Meyrick, 1915
- P. sexangula Meyrick, 1915
- P. signata Meyrick, 1915
- P. spatulata Meyrick, 1928
- P. stereograpta Meyrick, 1934
- P. subpersea Davis and Wagner, 2011
- P. symphanes Meyrick, 1926
- P. synglypta Meyrick, 1918
- P. tectonivora Meyrick, 1936
- P. temperatior Meyrick, 1936
- P. tethys Moreira & Vargas, 2012
- P. titania Meyrick, 1928
- P. toparcha Meyrick, 1918
- P. triortha Meyrick, 1906
- P. triploca Meyrick, 1928
- P. tropaeolicola Kawahara, Nishida & Davis, 2009
- P. unipunctella (Stephens, 1834)
- P. valentinensis M. Hering, 1936
- P. vitegenella Clemens, 1859
- P. vitella Ermolaev, 1987
- P. vitifoliella Chambers, 1871
- P. voutei M. Hering, 1932
- P. wampella Liu & Zeng, 1985
- P. wygodzinskyi E. M. Hering, 1958
- P. xenia M. Hering, 1936
