= Phyllocnistis triploca =

Scientific classification
- Kingdom: Animalia
- Phylum: Arthropoda
- Class: Insecta
- Order: Lepidoptera
- Family: Gracillariidae
- Genus: Phyllocnistis
- Species: P. triploca

Binomial name
- Phyllocnistis triploca (Meyrick, 1928)

Species of moth

Phyllocnistis triploca is a moth of the family Gracillariidae, known from Bihar, India. The hostplant for the species is an unidentified species of Loranthus.
