= Phyllocnistis chlorantica =

Scientific classification
- Kingdom: Animalia
- Phylum: Arthropoda
- Class: Insecta
- Order: Lepidoptera
- Family: Gracillariidae
- Genus: Phyllocnistis
- Species: P. chlorantica

Binomial name
- Phyllocnistis chlorantica Seksyaeva, 1992

Species of moth

Phyllocnistis chlorantica is a moth of the family Gracillariidae, known from the Russian Far East. The hostplant for the species is Chloranthus japonicus.
