= Phyllocnistis longipalpa =

Scientific classification
- Kingdom: Animalia
- Phylum: Arthropoda
- Class: Insecta
- Order: Lepidoptera
- Family: Gracillariidae
- Genus: Phyllocnistis
- Species: P. longipalpa

Binomial name
- Phyllocnistis longipalpa Davis and Wagner, 2011

Species of moth

Phyllocnistis longipalpa is a moth of the family Gracillariidae. It is known only from the Everglades National Park, Dade County, and along the Loop Road near Tamarind Hammock, Monroe County, Florida.

The length of the forewings is 2.3-2.6 mm. Adults have been recorded in April in southern Florida.

The larvae feed on Persea borbonia. They mine the leaves of their host plant. The mine has the form of a long, slender, serpentine gallery, containing a dark, narrow, median frass trail, present on the underside of the leaf, with pupation occurring in a slightly enlarged, elliptical chamber at the mine terminus along the leaf edge.

== Etymology ==
The specific name is derived from the Latin longus (meaning long) and palpus (meaning feeler), in reference to the elongate labial palpi, which are diagnostic for this species.
