= Phyllocnistis vitella =

Scientific classification
- Kingdom: Animalia
- Phylum: Arthropoda
- Clade: Pancrustacea
- Class: Insecta
- Order: Lepidoptera
- Family: Gracillariidae
- Genus: Phyllocnistis
- Species: P. vitella

Binomial name
- Phyllocnistis vitella (Ermolaev, 1987)

Species of moth

Phyllocnistis vitella is a moth of the family Gracillariidae, known from Russia. The hostplant for the species is Vitis amurensis.
