= Phyllocnistis bourquini =

Scientific classification
- Kingdom: Animalia
- Phylum: Arthropoda
- Clade: Pancrustacea
- Class: Insecta
- Order: Lepidoptera
- Family: Gracillariidae
- Genus: Phyllocnistis
- Species: P. bourquini

Binomial name
- Phyllocnistis bourquini (Pastrana, 1960)

Species of moth

Phyllocnistis bourquini is a moth of the family Gracillariidae, known from Argentina. The hostplant for the species is Tessaria integrifolia.
