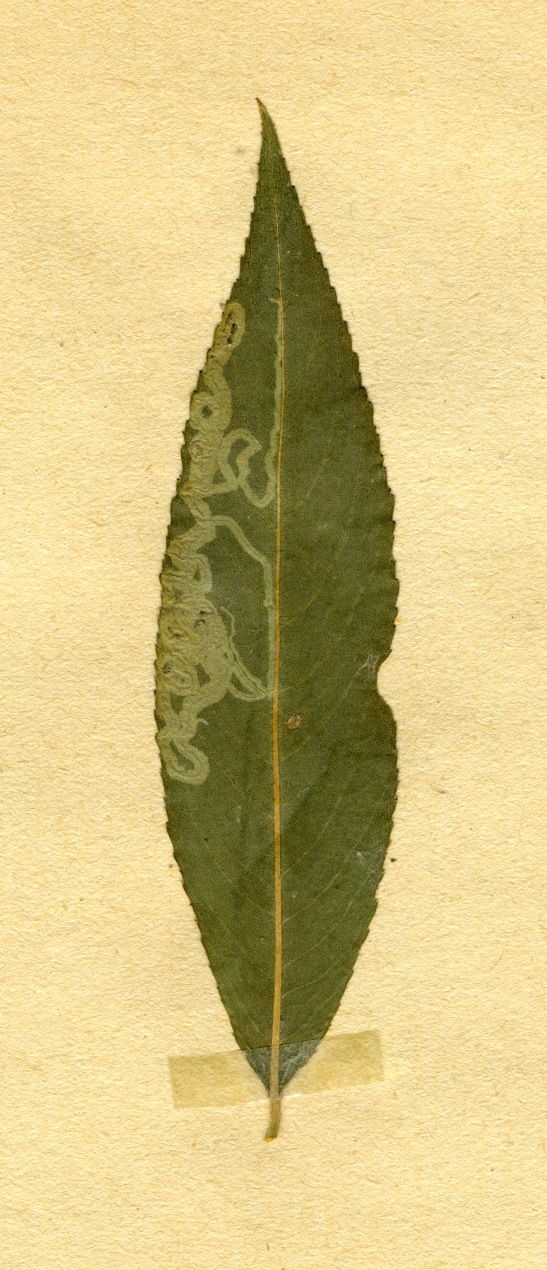
- Phyllocnistis valentinensis mines on Salix fragilis

Scientific classification
- Domain: Eukaryota
- Kingdom: Animalia
- Phylum: Arthropoda
- Class: Insecta
- Order: Lepidoptera
- Family: Gracillariidae
- Genus: Phyllocnistis
- Species: P. valentinensis

Binomial name
- Phyllocnistis valentinensis M. Hering, 1936

= Phyllocnistis valentinensis =

Species of moth

Phyllocnistis valentinensis is a moth of the family Gracillariidae. It is known from Spain, Greece and Bulgaria.

The larvae feed on Salix alba and Salix triandra. They mine the leaves of their host plant.
