= Phyllocnistis loxosticha =

Scientific classification
- Kingdom: Animalia
- Phylum: Arthropoda
- Class: Insecta
- Order: Lepidoptera
- Family: Gracillariidae
- Genus: Phyllocnistis
- Species: P. loxosticha

Binomial name
- Phyllocnistis loxosticha Bradley, 1965

Species of moth

Phyllocnistis loxosticha is a moth of the family Gracillariidae. It is known to be from Uganda.
