= Phyllocnistis tethys =

Scientific classification
- Domain: Eukaryota
- Kingdom: Animalia
- Phylum: Arthropoda
- Class: Insecta
- Order: Lepidoptera
- Family: Gracillariidae
- Genus: Phyllocnistis
- Species: P. tethys

Binomial name
- Phyllocnistis tethys Moreira & Vargas, 2012

Species of moth

Phyllocnistis tethys is a moth of the family Gracillariidae. It is found in southern Brazil.

The larvae feed on Passiflora organensis. They mine the leaves of their host plant.
