= Phyllocnistis symphanes =

Scientific classification
- Kingdom: Animalia
- Phylum: Arthropoda
- Class: Insecta
- Order: Lepidoptera
- Family: Gracillariidae
- Genus: Phyllocnistis
- Species: P. symphanes

Binomial name
- Phyllocnistis symphanes (Meyrick, 1926)

Species of moth

Phyllocnistis symphanes is a moth of the family Gracillariidae, known from Maharashtra and Karnataka, India. The hostplants for the species include Aglaia lawii and Aglaia littoralis.
