= Phyllocnistis meliacella =

Scientific classification
- Kingdom: Animalia
- Phylum: Arthropoda
- Class: Insecta
- Order: Lepidoptera
- Family: Gracillariidae
- Genus: Phyllocnistis
- Species: P. meliacella

Binomial name
- Phyllocnistis meliacella Becker, 1974

Species of moth

The mahogany leaf miner (Phyllocnistis meliacella) is a moth of the family Gracillariidae. It is known from Costa Rica, but has recently also been recorded from Florida in the United States.

The larvae feed on Meliaceae species.
