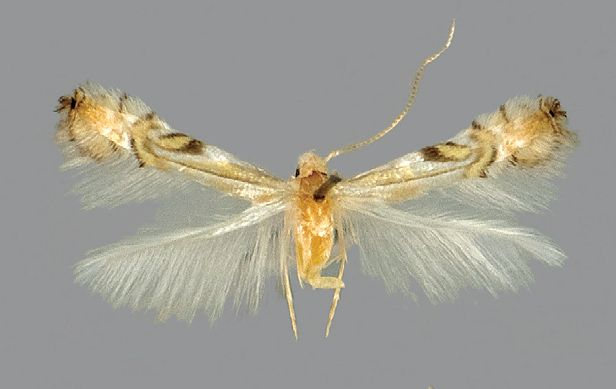
- Female

Scientific classification
- Kingdom: Animalia
- Phylum: Arthropoda
- Clade: Pancrustacea
- Class: Insecta
- Order: Lepidoptera
- Family: Gracillariidae
- Genus: Phyllocnistis
- Species: P. maxberryi

Binomial name
- Phyllocnistis maxberryi Kawahara, Nishida & Davis, 2009

= Phyllocnistis maxberryi =

Species of moth

Phyllocnistis maxberryi is a moth of the family Gracillariidae. It is known only from Costa Rica. It has been found on altitudes between 1,950 and 3,100 m in the Heredia Province, the Central Conservation Area and the Cartago Province, Cerro de la Muerte, Villa Mills, in Cordillera de Talamanca.

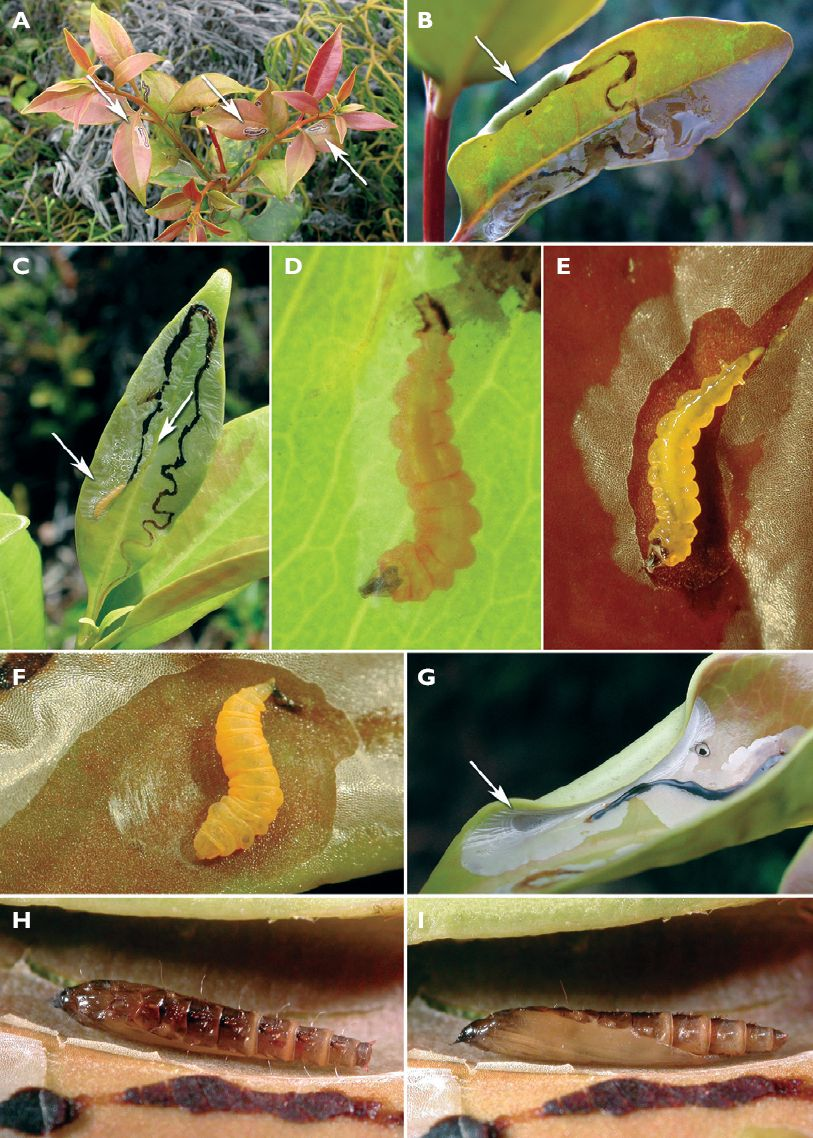
Life history of Phyllocnistis maxberryi. A Leaf mines of young growing Gaiadendron shoot B mature mine with pupal cocoon fold (arrow) C nearly mature mine and mature sap-feeding larva (left arrow), and oviposition location (right arrow) D close-up view of mature sap-feeding larva E openede mine showing mature sap-feeding larva in situ F opened young pupal cocoon fold showing cocoon-spinning larva in situ G pupal cocoon fold, arrow pointing at thinner pupal exit H opened pupal cocoon fold showing pupa in situ, dorsal view I pupa in situ, lateral view.

The length of the forewings is 2.2-3.7 mm.

The larvae feed on Gaiadendron punctatum.
