= Phyllocnistis ephimera =

Scientific classification
- Kingdom: Animalia
- Phylum: Arthropoda
- Clade: Pancrustacea
- Class: Insecta
- Order: Lepidoptera
- Family: Gracillariidae
- Genus: Phyllocnistis
- Species: P. ephimera

Binomial name
- Phyllocnistis ephimera Turner, 1926

Species of moth

Phyllocnistis ephimera is a moth of the family Gracillariidae. It is known from Queensland, Australia.
