= Phyllocnistis signata =

Scientific classification
- Kingdom: Animalia
- Phylum: Arthropoda
- Class: Insecta
- Order: Lepidoptera
- Family: Gracillariidae
- Genus: Phyllocnistis
- Species: P. signata

Binomial name
- Phyllocnistis signata (Meyrick, 1915)

Species of moth

Phyllocnistis signata is a moth of the family Gracillariidae, known from Tamil Nadu, India. It was described by E. Meyrick in 1915.
