= Phyllocnistis temperatior =

Scientific classification
- Kingdom: Animalia
- Phylum: Arthropoda
- Class: Insecta
- Order: Lepidoptera
- Family: Gracillariidae
- Genus: Phyllocnistis
- Species: P. temperatior

Binomial name
- Phyllocnistis temperatior (Meyrick, 1936)

Species of moth

Phyllocnistis temperatior is a moth of the family Gracillariidae, known from Java, Indonesia. The hostplant for the species is an unidentified species of Leea.
