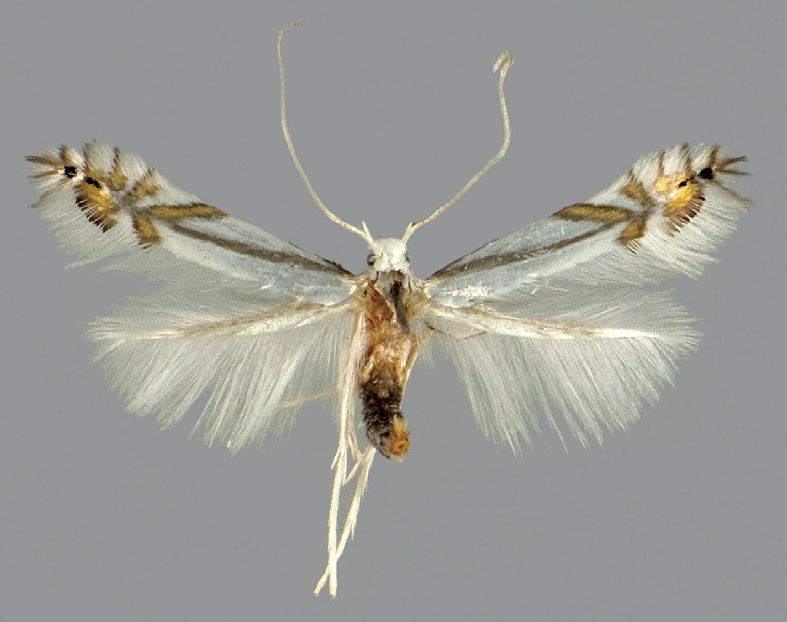
- Male

Scientific classification
- Kingdom: Animalia
- Phylum: Arthropoda
- Clade: Pancrustacea
- Class: Insecta
- Order: Lepidoptera
- Family: Gracillariidae
- Genus: Phyllocnistis
- Species: P. tropaeolicola

Binomial name
- Phyllocnistis tropaeolicola Kawahara, Nishida & Davis, 2009

= Phyllocnistis tropaeolicola =

Species of moth

Phyllocnistis tropaeolicola is a moth of the family Gracillariidae. It is endemic to Costa Rica, where it has been recorded only from Cerro de la Muerte in the province of Cartago at an elevation of 3,100 m (10,200 ft). The length of the forewings is 2.6–5.0 mm (0.10–0.20 in). The larvae feed on Tropaeolum emarginatum.

== Taxonomy ==
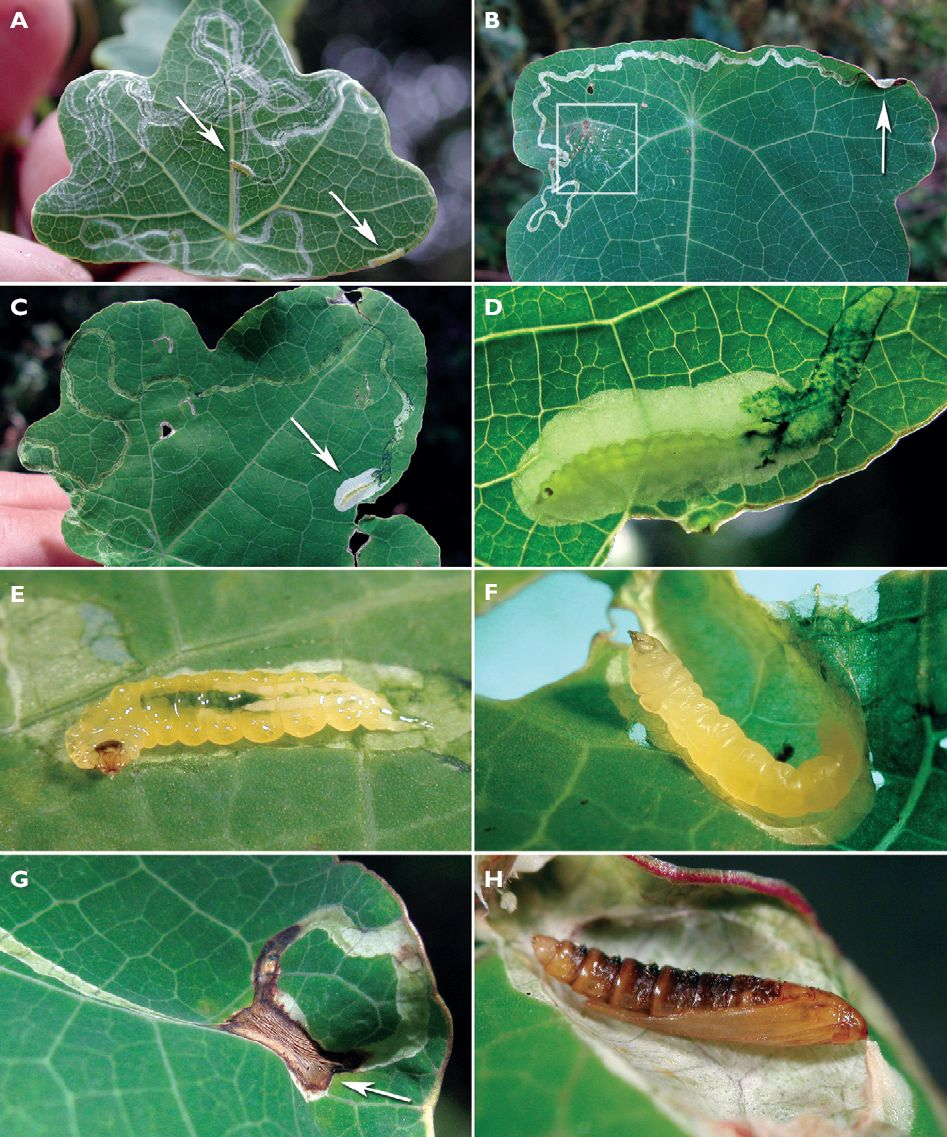
Life history of Phyllocnistis tropaeolicola

Phyllocnistis tropaeolicola was formally described in 2009 by based on an adult male specimen collected from Cerro de la Muerte in the Cartago Province of Costa Rica. The specific epithet is an amalgamation of the generic name of the host, Tropaeolum, and the Latin word meaning "inhabitant".

== Description ==
Phyllocnistis tropaeolicola is a small species, with adults having a forewing length of 2.6–5.0 mm (0.10–0.20 in) and an abdomen around 2 mm (0.08 in) long. The forewing is silvery-white. The upper surface of the forewing has thin brown costal fascia with a dark brown border. The longitudinal fascia are thin and dark brown and stretch diagonally from the costal base across two-thirds of the wing. The transverse fascia are V-shaped. There are three dark brown costal strigulae on the forewing. The hindwing is white with a brown strip along the edge of the costa. The head has many silvery-white hairs, a pair of antennae as long as the forewing, and long, thin labial palpi. The abdomen is brownish-gray above and silvery-white below. The legs are silvery-white.

The larvae of the moth make thin, irregular, and snaking mines along the edges of fresh fully-grown leaves. These mines are pale green to white in color.

== Distribution and ecology ==
Phyllocnistis tropaeolicola is endemic to Costa Rica, where it has been recorded only from Cerro de la Muerte in the province of Cartago. It inhabits forests at an elevation of 3,100 m (10,200 ft). The host for the moth is the Tropaeolaceae plant Tropaeolum emarginatum, a neotropical tree that grows in montane environments in Costa Rica.
