= List of moths of India (Gracillariidae) =

This is a list of moths of the family Gracillariidae that are found in India. It also acts as an index to the species articles and forms part of the full List of moths of India.

- Acrocercops allactopa Meyrick, 1916
- Acrocercops amethystopa Meyrick, 1916
- Acrocercops anthracuris Meyrick, 1926
- Acrocercops argyraspis Meyrick, 1908
- Acrocercops astiopa Meyrick, 1930
- Acrocercops auricilla (Stainton, 1859)
- Acrocercops barringtoniella (van Deventer, 1904)
- Acrocercops bifrenis Meyrick, 1918
- Acrocercops calycophthalma Meyrick, 1926
- Acrocercops chrysargyra Meyrick, 1908
- Acrocercops chrysophila Meyrick, 1937
- Acrocercops chrysoplitis Meyrick, 1937
- Acrocercops citrodora Meyrick, 1914
- Acrocercops clepsinoma Meyrick, 1916
- Acrocercops convoluta Meyrick, 1908
- Acrocercops cornicina Meyrick, 1908
- Acrocercops crystallopa Meyrick, 1916
- Acrocercops cyanodeta Meyrick, 1918
- Acrocercops cylicota Meyrick, 1914
- Acrocercops defigurata Meyrick, 1928
- Acrocercops diacentrota Meyrick, 1935
- Acrocercops diatonica Meyrick, 1916
- Acrocercops epiclina Meyrick, 1918
- Acrocercops eranista Meyrick, 1918
- Acrocercops erioplaca Meyrick, 1918
- Acrocercops euthycolona Meyrick, 1931
- Acrocercops extenuata Meyrick, 1916
- Acrocercops galeopa Meyrick, 1908
- Acrocercops hapalarga Meyrick, 1916
- Acrocercops helicopa Meyrick, 1919
- Acrocercops hemiglypta Meyrick, 1916
- Acrocercops hexachorda Meyrick, 1914
- Acrocercops hierocosma Meyrick, 1912
- Acrocercops hormista Meyrick, 1916
- Acrocercops hyphantica Meyrick, 1912
- Acrocercops irradians Meyrick, 1931
- Acrocercops lenticulata Meyrick, 1922
- Acrocercops leucophaea Meyrick, 1919
- Acrocercops lithochalca Meyrick, 1930
- Acrocercops loxias Meyrick, 1918
- Acrocercops lysibathra Meyrick, 1916
- Acrocercops macroclina Meyrick, 1916
- Acrocercops macroplaca Meyrick, 1908
- Acrocercops mantica Meyrick, 1908
- Acrocercops mechanopla Meyrick, 1934
- Acrocercops melanoplecta Meyrick, 1908
- Acrocercops myriogramma Meyrick, 1937
- Acrocercops niphocremna Meyrick, 1932
- Acrocercops nitidula (Stainton, 1862)
- Acrocercops ochronephela Meyrick, 1908
- Acrocercops orbifera Meyrick, 1908
- Acrocercops ortholocha Meyrick, 1908
- Acrocercops orthostacta Meyrick, 1918
- Acrocercops paliacma Meyrick, 1930
- Acrocercops patricia Meyrick, 1908
- Acrocercops pentalocha Meyrick, 1912
- Acrocercops petalopa Meyrick, 1934
- Acrocercops phaeomorpha Meyrick, 1919
- Acrocercops phaeospora Meyrick, 1916
- Acrocercops pharopeda Meyrick, 1916
- Acrocercops polyclasta Meyrick, 1919
- Acrocercops praeclusa Meyrick, 1914
- Acrocercops prompta Meyrick, 1916
- Acrocercops psaliodes Meyrick, 1926
- Acrocercops quadrisecta Meyrick, 1932
- Acrocercops rhothogramma T. B. Fletcher, 1933
- Acrocercops sauropis Meyrick, 1908
- Acrocercops scandalota Meyrick, 1914
- Acrocercops scenias Meyrick, 1914
- Acrocercops scoliograpta Meyrick, 1922
- Acrocercops scriptulata Meyrick, 1916
- Acrocercops selmatica Meyrick, 1918
- Acrocercops sporograpta Meyrick, 1932
- Acrocercops strophala Meyrick, 1908
- Acrocercops supplex Meyrick, 1918
- Acrocercops telestis Meyrick, 1911
- Acrocercops tenera Meyrick, 1914
- Acrocercops terminaliae (Stainton, 1862)
- Acrocercops tetradeta Meyrick, 1926
- Acrocercops thrylodes Meyrick, 1930
- Acrocercops thylacaula Meyrick, 1932
- Acrocercops tricyma Meyrick, 1908
- Acrocercops triscalma Meyrick, 1916
- Acrocercops trissoptila Meyrick, 1921
- Acrocercops ustulatella (Stainton, 1859)
- Acrocercops vanula Meyrick, 1912
- Acrocercops viatica Meyrick, 1916
- Acrocercops zopherandra Meyrick, 1931
- Acrocercops zygonoma Meyrick, 1921
- Artifodina strigulata Kumata, 1985
- Borboryctis triplaca (Meyrick, 1908)
- Caloptilia acinata Yuan & Robinson, 1993
- Caloptilia aeolocentra (Meyrick, 1922)
- Caloptilia argalea (Meyrick, 1908)
- Caloptilia ariana (Meyrick, 1914)
- Caloptilia auspex (Meyrick, 1912)
- Caloptilia baringi Yuan & Robinson, 1993
- Caloptilia citrochrysa (Meyrick, 1930)
- Caloptilia clastopetra (Meyrick, 1928)
- Caloptilia deltosticta (Meyrick, 1933)
- Caloptilia eurycryptis (Meyrick, 1928)
- Caloptilia hemiconis (Meyrick, 1894)
- Caloptilia heterocosma (Meyrick, 1931)
- Caloptilia iridophanes (Meyrick, 1935)
- Caloptilia isochrysa (Meyrick, 1908)
- Caloptilia leucolitha (Meyrick, 1912)
- Caloptilia mastopis (Meyrick, 1918)
- Caloptilia megalotis (Meyrick, 1908)
- Caloptilia metadoxa (Meyrick, 1908)
- Caloptilia octopunctata (Turner, 1894)
- Caloptilia oxydelta (Meyrick, 1908)
- Caloptilia parasticta (Meyrick, 1908)
- Caloptilia perisphena (Meyrick, 1905)
- Caloptilia porphyracma (Meyrick, 1922)
- Caloptilia protiella (van Deventer, 1904)
- Caloptilia pterostoma (Meyrick, 1922)
- Caloptilia recitata (Meyrick, 1918)
- Caloptilia scaeodesma (Meyrick, 1928)
- Caloptilia scansoria (Meyrick, 1910)
- Caloptilia soyella (van Deventer, 1904)
- Caloptilia stigmatella (Fabricius, 1781)
- Caloptilia syrphetias (Meyrick, 1907)
- Caloptilia teleodelta (Meyrick, 1926)
- Caloptilia theivora (Walsingham, 1891)
- Caloptilia thymophanes (Meyrick, 1928)
- Caloptilia trissochroa (Meyrick, 1931)
- Caloptilia zachrysa (Meyrick, 1907)
- Caloptilia zonotarsa (Meyrick, 1936)
- Calybites phasianipennella (Hübner, [1813])
- Cameraria bauhiniae (Stainton, 1856)
- Cameraria magnisignata Kumata, 1993
- Cameraria virgulata (Meyrick, 1914)
- Conopomorpha cramerella (Snellen, 1904)
- Conopomorpha litchiella Bradley, 1986
- Conopomorpha sinensis Bradley, 1986
- Cryptolectica ensiformis (Yuan, 1986)
- Cryptologa nystalea T. B. Fletcher, 1921
- Cuphodes plexigrapha (Meyrick, 1916)
- Cuphodes profluens (Meyrick, 1916)
- Cyphosticha pterocola Meyrick, 1914
- Dekeidoryxis asynacta (Meyrick, 1918)
- Dekeidoryxis maesae Kumata, 1989
- Deoptilia syrista (Meyrick, 1926)
- Dialectica aemula (Meyrick, 1916)
- Dialectica geometra (Meyrick, 1916)
- Ectropina acidula (Meyrick, 1911)
- Ectropina raychaudhurii Kumata, 1979
- Epicephala albifrons (Stainton, 1859)
- Epicephala ancylopa Meyrick, 1918
- Epicephala bromias Meyrick, 1910
- Epicephala calasiris Meyrick, 1908
- Epicephala orientale (Stainton, 1856)
- Epicephala sphenitis Meyrick, 1931
- Epicephala stauropa Meyrick, 1908
- Epicephala strepsiploca Meyrick, 1918
- Epicephala subtilis Meyrick, 1922
- Eteoryctis deversa (Meyrick, 1922)
- Eteoryctis gemoniella (Stainton, 1862)
- Eteoryctis syngramma (Meyrick, 1914)
- Gibbovalva civica (Meyrick, 1914)
- Gibbovalva quadrifasciata (Stainton, 1862)
- Gibbovalva urbana (Meyrick, 1908)
- Ketapangia leucochorda (Meyrick, 1908)
- Liocrobyla paraschista Meyrick, 1916
- Macarostola callischema Meyrick, 1908
- Macarostola coccinea (Walsingham, 1900)
- Macarostola haemataula Meyrick, 1912
- Macarostola tegulata Meyrick, 1908
- Macarostola zehntneri (Snellen, 1902)
- Melanocercops cyclopa (Meyrick, 1908)
- Melanocercops desiccata (Meyrick, 1916)
- Melanocercops elaphopa (Meyrick, 1914)
- Melanocercops ficuvorella (Yazaki, 1926)
- Melanocercops phractopa (Meyrick, 1918)
- Monocercops resplendens (Stainton, 1862)
- Parectopa capnias Meyrick, 1908
- Parectopa oxysphena Meyrick, 1934
- Parectopa promylaea (Meyrick, 1817)
- Parornix concussa (Meyrick, 1933)
- Phodoryctis caerulea (Meyrick, 1912)
- Phrixosceles hydrocosma Meyrick, 1908
- Phrixosceles phricotarsa Meyrick, 1916
- Phrixosceles pteridograpta Meyrick, 1935
- Phrixosceles trochosticha Meyrick, 1908
- Phyllocnistis amydropa Meyrick, 1934
- Phyllocnistis argothea Meyrick, 1933
- Phyllocnistis chrysophthalma Meyrick, 1915
- Phyllocnistis cirrhophanes Meyrick, 1915
- Phyllocnistis citrella Stainton, 1856
- Phyllocnistis citronympha Meyrick, 1926
- Phyllocnistis echinodes Meyrick, 1926
- Phyllocnistis endoxa Meyrick, 1926
- Phyllocnistis exaeta Meyrick, 1926
- Phyllocnistis habrochroa Meyrick, 1915
- Phyllocnistis hagnopa Meyrick, 1920
- Phyllocnistis helicodes Meyrick, 1916
- Phyllocnistis lucernifera Meyrick, 1935
- Phyllocnistis micrographa Meyrick, 1916
- Phyllocnistis oxyopa Meyrick, 1918
- Phyllocnistis phrixopa Meyrick, 1926
- Phyllocnistis saligna (Zeller, 1839)
- Phyllocnistis signata Meyrick, 1915
- Phyllocnistis spatulata Meyrick, 1928
- Phyllocnistis stereograpta Meyrick, 1934
- Phyllocnistis symphanes Meyrick, 1926
- Phyllocnistis synglypta Meyrick, 1918
- Phyllocnistis toparcha Meyrick, 1918
- Phyllocnistis triploca Meyrick, 1928
- Phyllonorycter acratynta (Meyrick, 1916)
- Phyllonorycter clepsiphaga (Meyrick, 1922)
- Phyllonorycter conformis (Meyrick, 1910)
- Phyllonorycter conista (Meyrick, 1911)
- Phyllonorycter drepanota (Meyrick, 1928)
- Phyllonorycter epichares (Meyrick, 1928)
- Phyllonorycter eratantha (Meyrick, 1922)
- Phyllonorycter fasciformis (Meyrick, 1930)
- Phyllonorycter ganodes (Meyrick, 1918)
- Phyllonorycter hapalotoxa (Meyrick, 1921)
- Phyllonorycter incurvata (Meyrick, 1916)
- Phyllonorycter iochrysis (Meyrick, 1931)
- Phyllonorycter iteina (Meyrick, 1918)
- Phyllonorycter philerasta (Meyrick, 1922)
- Phyllonorycter triarcha (Meyrick, 1908)
- Phyllonorycter triplex (Meyrick, 1914)
- Phyllonorycter zonochares (Meyrick, 1933)
- Porphyrosela dorinda (Meyrick, 1912)
- Porphyrosela neodoxa (Meyrick, 1916)
- Spulerina astaurota (Meyrick, 1922)
- Spulerina dissotoma (Meyrick, 1931)
- Spulerina isonoma (Meyrick, 1916)
- Spulerina malicola (Meyrick, 1921)
- Stomphastis chalybacma (Meyrick, 1908)
- Stomphastis labyrinthica (Meyrick, 1918)
- Stomphastis thraustica (Meyrick, 1908)
- Synnympha perfrenis Meyrick, 1920
- Telamoptilia cathedraea (Meyrick, 1908)
- Telamoptilia hemistacta (Meyrick, 1924)
- Telamoptilia prosacta (Meyrick, 1918)

== See also ==
- List of moths of India
