= Acrocercops homalacta =

Scientific classification
- Kingdom: Animalia
- Phylum: Arthropoda
- Class: Insecta
- Order: Lepidoptera
- Family: Gracillariidae
- Genus: Acrocercops
- Species: A. homalacta

Binomial name
- Acrocercops homalacta Meyrick, 1927

Species of moth

Acrocercops homalacta is a moth of the family Gracillariidae, known from Guadalcanal and Rennell Island in the Solomon Islands, as well as Samoa. It was described by Edward Meyrick in 1927.

This species is closely allied to the Indian Acrocercops cathedraea and the African Acrocercops bifasciata.
