= Acrocercops ustulatella =

Scientific classification
- Kingdom: Animalia
- Phylum: Arthropoda
- Clade: Pancrustacea
- Class: Insecta
- Order: Lepidoptera
- Family: Gracillariidae
- Genus: Acrocercops
- Species: A. ustulatella

Binomial name
- Acrocercops ustulatella (Stainton, 1859)

Synonyms
- Acrocercops isochorda (Meyrick, 1907)

Species of moth

Acrocercops ustulatella is a moth of the family Gracillariidae. It is known from India (West Bengal) and Sri Lanka.

The larvae feed on Diospyros ebenum, Diospyros embryopteris, Diospyros malabarica and Diospyros montana. They probably mine the leaves of their host plant.
