= Acrocercops scriptulata =

Scientific classification
- Domain: Eukaryota
- Kingdom: Animalia
- Phylum: Arthropoda
- Class: Insecta
- Order: Lepidoptera
- Family: Gracillariidae
- Genus: Acrocercops
- Species: A. scriptulata

Binomial name
- Acrocercops scriptulata Meyrick, 1916

Synonyms
- Diphtheroptila scriptulata

Species of moth

Acrocercops scriptulata is a moth of the family Gracillariidae. It is known from India (Karnataka) and Taiwan.

The larvae feed on Terminalia paniculata. They probably mine the leaves of their host plant.
