= Ectropina suttoni =

Scientific classification
- Kingdom: Animalia
- Phylum: Arthropoda
- Class: Insecta
- Order: Lepidoptera
- Family: Gracillariidae
- Genus: Ectropina
- Species: E. suttoni

Binomial name
- Ectropina suttoni (Bland, 1980)

Synonyms
- Epicephala suttoni Bland, 1980

Species of moth

Ectropina suttoni is a moth of the family Gracillariidae. It is known from Nigeria.

The wingspan is 8 mm (0.31 in) (holotype, female).
