= Dekeidoryxis khooi =

Scientific classification
- Kingdom: Animalia
- Phylum: Arthropoda
- Class: Insecta
- Order: Lepidoptera
- Family: Gracillariidae
- Genus: Dekeidoryxis
- Species: D. khooi

Binomial name
- Dekeidoryxis khooi Kumata, 1989

Species of moth

Dekeidoryxis khooi is a moth of the family Gracillariidae. It is known from Perak, Malaysia.

The wingspan is 5.2–6.7 mm.

The larvae feed on Maesa ramentacea. They probably mine the leaves of their host plant.

== Etymology ==
This species is named in honour of Dr. Khoo Soo Ghee of the Zoological Department of the University of Malaya.
