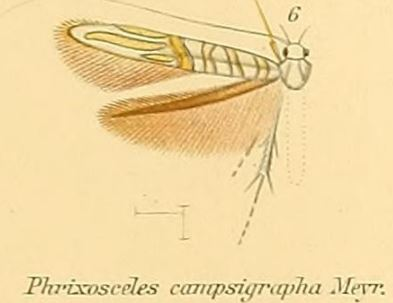
- Phrixosceles campsigrapha

Scientific classification
- Kingdom: Animalia
- Phylum: Arthropoda
- Class: Insecta
- Order: Lepidoptera
- Family: Gracillariidae
- Subfamily: Gracillariinae
- Genus: Phrixosceles; Meyrick, 1908

Species
- See text

= Phrixosceles =

Genus of moths

Phrixosceles is a genus of moths in the family Gracillariidae.

== Species ==
- Phrixosceles campsigrapha Meyrick, 1908
- Phrixosceles fibulatrix Meyrick, 1922
- Phrixosceles hydrocosma Meyrick, 1908
- Phrixosceles literaria Meyrick, 1908
- Phrixosceles phricotarsa Meyrick, 1916
- Phrixosceles pteridograpta Meyrick, 1935
- Phrixosceles scioplintha Meyrick, 1934
- Phrixosceles trochosticha Meyrick, 1908
