= Dekeidoryxis =

Scientific classification
- Kingdom: Animalia
- Phylum: Arthropoda
- Class: Insecta
- Order: Lepidoptera
- Family: Gracillariidae
- Subfamily: Acrocercopinae
- Genus: Dekeidoryxis; Kumata, 1989

Species
- See text

Genus of moths

Dekeidoryxis is a genus of moths in the family Gracillariidae.

== Etymology ==
Dekeidoryxis is derived from the Greek dekos (meaning worm), eidos (meaning form, likeness) and oryxis (meaning digging, mining).

== Species ==
- Dekeidoryxis asynacta (Meyrick, 1918)
- Dekeidoryxis khooi Kumata, 1989
- Dekeidoryxis maesae Kumata, 1989
