= Stomphastis rorkei =

Scientific classification
- Kingdom: Animalia
- Phylum: Arthropoda
- Class: Insecta
- Order: Lepidoptera
- Family: Gracillariidae
- Genus: Stomphastis
- Species: S. rorkei

Binomial name
- Stomphastis rorkei Vári, 1961

Species of moth

Stomphastis rorkei is a moth of the family Gracillariidae. It is known to live in South Africa, Namibia and Zimbabwe.

The larvae feed on Croton gratissimus.
