= Borboryctis euryae =

Scientific classification
- Kingdom: Animalia
- Phylum: Arthropoda
- Class: Insecta
- Order: Lepidoptera
- Family: Gracillariidae
- Genus: Borboryctis
- Species: B. euryae

Binomial name
- Borboryctis euryae Kumata & Kuroko, 1988

Species of moth

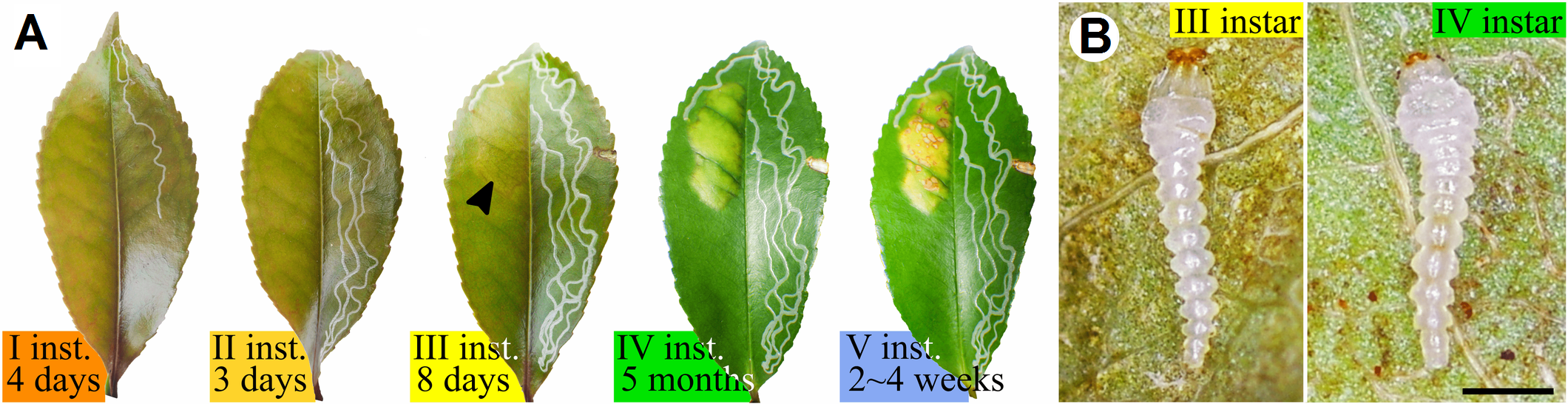
Life history of Borboryctis euryae.

Borboryctis euryae is a moth of the family Gracillariidae. It is known from Japan (Honshū, Kyūshū, Shikoku and Tusima).

The wingspan is 6.9–8.1 millimetres (0.27–0.32 in).

The larvae feed on Eurya emarginata and Eurya japonica. They mine the leaves of their host plant and induce a gall in their mine at fourth instar.
