= Ectropina citricula =

Scientific classification
- Kingdom: Animalia
- Phylum: Arthropoda
- Class: Insecta
- Order: Lepidoptera
- Family: Gracillariidae
- Genus: Ectropina
- Species: E. citricula

Binomial name
- Ectropina citricula (Meyrick, 1912)

Synonyms
- Gracilaria citricula Meyrick, 1912

Species of moth

Ectropina citricula is a moth of the family Gracillariidae. It is known from South Africa.
