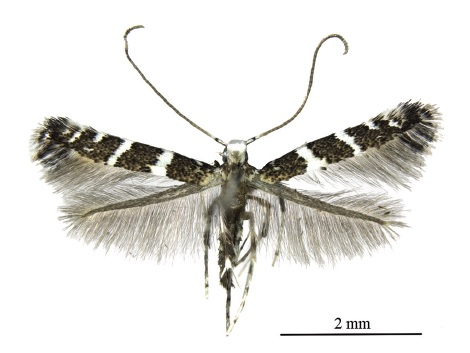

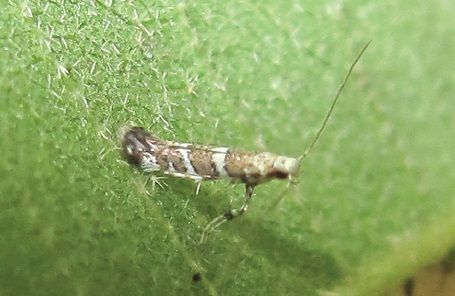

Scientific classification
- Domain: Eukaryota
- Kingdom: Animalia
- Phylum: Arthropoda
- Class: Insecta
- Order: Lepidoptera
- Family: Gracillariidae
- Genus: Telamoptilia
- Species: T. grewiae

Binomial name
- Telamoptilia grewiae Liu T, Wang S & Li H, 2015

= Telamoptilia grewiae =

Species of moth

Telamoptilia grewiae is a moth of the family Gracillariidae. It is found in China (Tianjin).

The wingspan is 6−8 mm. The forewings are greyish fuscous to blackish fuscous, the costal margin with a white spot basally at about 1/10 and one before apex, the former sometimes touching the fold posteriorly. There is some stria at the distal 3/10 and 1/6 obliquely outward, reaching the middle of the wing and near the termen respectively. There is transverse white fascia from the costal 1/3 and 1/2 obliquely outward, reaching the dorsal 1/2 and before the end of the fold respectively, edged with blackish fuscous to black scales. The hindwings are uniformly grey.

The larvae feed on Grewia biloba and its variety parviflora. They mine the leaves of their host plant. They mine on the upper surface. The mine begins as an epidermal silvery curved white line which soon enlarges to a whitish blotch. Yellowish-fuscous or fuscous lines can be found on the surface of the blotch. As the larva develops, the blotch usually incorporates the earlier linear mine. The last instar larva vacates the mine for pupation by chewing a semicircular opening near the margin of the blotch. Cocoons are usually made in the leaf wrinkles. The larvae are pale green to yellowish-green and reach a length of 4 mm. The species overwinters in the pupal stage.

== Etymology ==
The species name is derived from the host plant genus Grewia, indicating the host of the species.

== Gallery ==
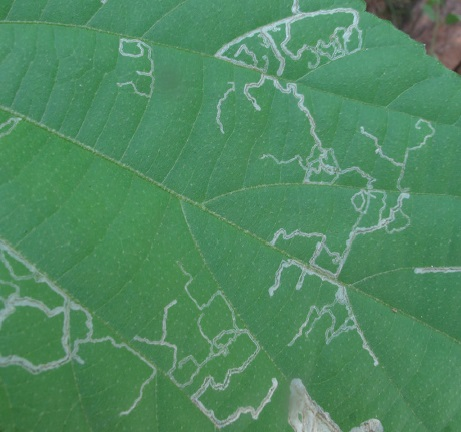
Linear mine first instar larva

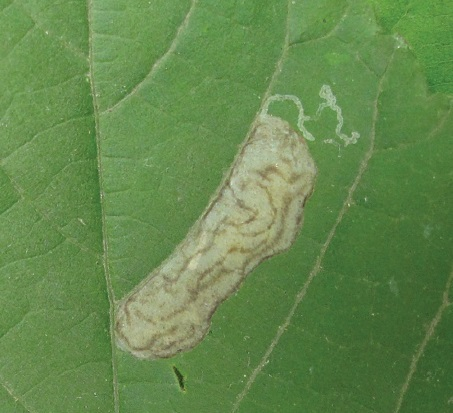
Blotch mine later instar larva

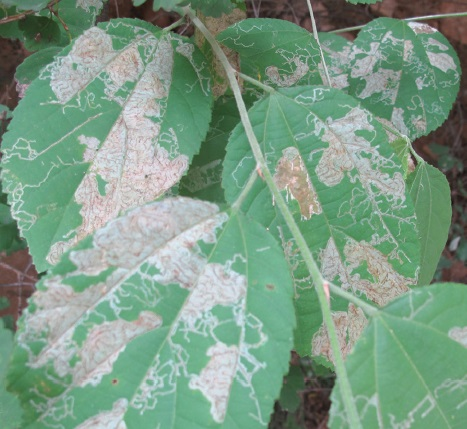
Damage
