= Acrocercops vanula =

Scientific classification
- Domain: Eukaryota
- Kingdom: Animalia
- Phylum: Arthropoda
- Class: Insecta
- Order: Lepidoptera
- Family: Gracillariidae
- Genus: Acrocercops
- Species: A. vanula

Binomial name
- Acrocercops vanula Meyrick, 1912

Species of moth

Acrocercops vanula is a moth of the family Gracillariidae. It is known from India (Karnataka).

The larvae feed on Terminalia catappa, Terminalia paniculata and Terminalia tomentosa. They probably mine the leaves of their host plant.
