= Stomphastis polygoni =

Scientific classification
- Kingdom: Animalia
- Phylum: Arthropoda
- Class: Insecta
- Order: Lepidoptera
- Family: Gracillariidae
- Genus: Stomphastis
- Species: S. polygoni

Binomial name
- Stomphastis polygoni Vári, 1961

Species of moth

Stomphastis polygoni is a moth of the family Gracillariidae. It is found primarily in China (Hong Kong, Yunnan, Hainan and Guangdong) and Zimbabwe.

The larvae feed on Polygonum setosulum. They mine the leaves of their host plant.
