= Stomphastis mixograpta =

Scientific classification
- Domain: Eukaryota
- Kingdom: Animalia
- Phylum: Arthropoda
- Class: Insecta
- Order: Lepidoptera
- Family: Gracillariidae
- Genus: Stomphastis
- Species: S. mixograpta

Binomial name
- Stomphastis mixograpta Vári, 1961

Species of moth

Stomphastis mixograpta is a moth of the family Gracillariidae. It is known from South Africa.
