= Telamoptilia tiliae =

Scientific classification
- Kingdom: Animalia
- Phylum: Arthropoda
- Class: Insecta
- Order: Lepidoptera
- Family: Gracillariidae
- Genus: Telamoptilia
- Species: T. tiliae

Binomial name
- Telamoptilia tiliae Kumata & Ermolaev, 1988

Species of moth

Telamoptilia tiliae is a moth of the family Gracillariidae. It is known from Japan (Hokkaidō) and the Russian Far East.

The wingspan is 6.8–8 mm.

The larvae feed on Tilia maximowicziana. They probably mine the leaves of their host plant.
