= Stomphastis crotonis =

Scientific classification
- Kingdom: Animalia
- Phylum: Arthropoda
- Class: Insecta
- Order: Lepidoptera
- Family: Gracillariidae
- Genus: Stomphastis
- Species: S. crotonis

Binomial name
- Stomphastis crotonis Vári, 1961

Species of moth

Stomphastis crotonis is a moth of the family Gracillariidae. It is known from South Africa and Namibia.

The larvae feed on Croton menyharthii. They mine the leaves of their host plant.
