= Phyllonorycter fasciformis =

Scientific classification
- Kingdom: Animalia
- Phylum: Arthropoda
- Class: Insecta
- Order: Lepidoptera
- Family: Gracillariidae
- Genus: Phyllonorycter
- Species: P. fasciformis

Binomial name
- Phyllonorycter fasciformis (Meyrick, 1930)

Species of moth

Phyllonorycter fasciformis is a moth of the family Gracillariidae. It is known from Bihar, India.

The larvae feed on Polygonum glabrum. They probably mine the leaves of their host plant.
