= Artifodina kurokoi =

Scientific classification
- Kingdom: Animalia
- Phylum: Arthropoda
- Class: Insecta
- Order: Lepidoptera
- Family: Gracillariidae
- Genus: Artifodina
- Species: A. kurokoi

Binomial name
- Artifodina kurokoi Kumata, 1995

Species of moth

Artifodina kurokoi is a moth of the family Gracillariidae. It is known from Thailand.
