= Borboryctis barringtoniella =

Scientific classification
- Domain: Eukaryota
- Kingdom: Animalia
- Phylum: Arthropoda
- Class: Insecta
- Order: Lepidoptera
- Family: Gracillariidae
- Genus: Borboryctis
- Species: B. barringtoniella

Binomial name
- Borboryctis barringtoniella (van Deventer, 1904)

Synonyms
- Gracilaria barringtoniella van Deventer, 1904; Acrocercops barringtoniella (van Deventer, 1904)

Species of moth

Borboryctis barringtoniella or Acrocercops barringtoniella is a moth of the family Gracillariidae. It is known from India, Java (Indonesia), Sarawak (Malaysian Borneo), and Peninsular Malaysia. It is a leaf miner. The hostplants for the species include Barringtonia spicata and Careya arborea.
