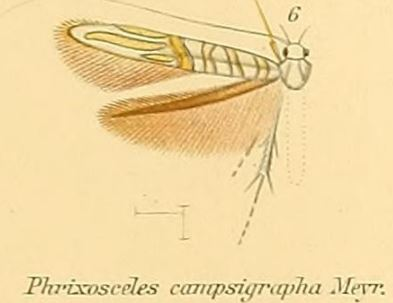

Scientific classification
- Kingdom: Animalia
- Phylum: Arthropoda
- Class: Insecta
- Order: Lepidoptera
- Family: Gracillariidae
- Genus: Phrixosceles
- Species: P. campsigrapha

Binomial name
- Phrixosceles campsigrapha Meyrick, 1908

= Phrixosceles campsigrapha =

Species of moth

Phrixosceles campsigrapha is a moth of the family Gracillariidae. It is known from Sri Lanka
