= Acrocercops loxias =

Scientific classification
- Domain: Eukaryota
- Kingdom: Animalia
- Phylum: Arthropoda
- Class: Insecta
- Order: Lepidoptera
- Family: Gracillariidae
- Genus: Acrocercops
- Species: A. loxias

Binomial name
- Acrocercops loxias Meyrick, 1918

Species of moth

Acrocercops loxias is a moth of the family Gracillariidae. It is known from India (Rajasthan) and Madagascar.

The larvae feed on Cleistocalyx operculatus, Eugenia cumini and Eugenia jambolana. They probably mine the leaves of their host plant.
