= Melanocercops =

Scientific classification
- Kingdom: Animalia
- Phylum: Arthropoda
- Class: Insecta
- Order: Lepidoptera
- Family: Gracillariidae
- Subfamily: Acrocercopinae
- Genus: Melanocercops; Kumata & Kuroko, 1988

Species
- See text

Genus of moths

Melanocercops is a genus of moths in the family Gracillariidae.

== Species ==
- Melanocercops cyclopa (Meyrick, 1908)
- Melanocercops desiccata (Meyrick, 1916)
- Melanocercops elaphopa (Meyrick, 1914)
- Melanocercops ficuvorella (Yazaki, 1926)
- Melanocercops melanommata (Turner, 1913)
- Melanocercops phractopa (Meyrick, 1918)
