= Telamoptilia geyeri =

Scientific classification
- Kingdom: Animalia
- Phylum: Arthropoda
- Class: Insecta
- Order: Lepidoptera
- Family: Gracillariidae
- Genus: Telamoptilia
- Species: T. geyeri

Binomial name
- Telamoptilia geyeri (Vári, 1961)

Synonyms
- Acrocercops geyeri Vári, 1961

Species of moth

Telamoptilia geyeri is a moth of the family Gracillariidae. It is known from Zimbabwe and South Africa.

The larvae feed on Pavonia columella. They mine the leaves of their host plant.
