= Stomphastis dodonaeae =

Scientific classification
- Domain: Eukaryota
- Kingdom: Animalia
- Phylum: Arthropoda
- Class: Insecta
- Order: Lepidoptera
- Family: Gracillariidae
- Genus: Stomphastis
- Species: S. dodonaeae

Binomial name
- Stomphastis dodonaeae Vári, 1961

Species of moth

Stomphastis dodonaeae is a moth of the family Gracillariidae. It is known from South Africa and Madagascar.
