= Stomphastis crotoniphila =

Scientific classification
- Kingdom: Animalia
- Phylum: Arthropoda
- Clade: Pancrustacea
- Class: Insecta
- Order: Lepidoptera
- Family: Gracillariidae
- Genus: Stomphastis
- Species: S. crotoniphila

Binomial name
- Stomphastis crotoniphila Vári, 1961

Species of moth

Stomphastis crotoniphila is a moth of the family Gracillariidae. It is known from South Africa.

The larvae feed on Croton sylvaticus. They mine the leaves of their host plant.
