= Phrixosceles scioplintha =

Scientific classification
- Kingdom: Animalia
- Phylum: Arthropoda
- Class: Insecta
- Order: Lepidoptera
- Family: Gracillariidae
- Genus: Phrixosceles
- Species: P. scioplintha

Binomial name
- Phrixosceles scioplintha Meyrick, 1934

Synonyms
- Cuphodes scioplintha

Species of moth

Phrixosceles scioplintha is a moth of the family Gracillariidae. It is known from Taiwan.
