= Stomphastis tremina =

Scientific classification
- Kingdom: Animalia
- Phylum: Arthropoda
- Class: Insecta
- Order: Lepidoptera
- Family: Gracillariidae
- Genus: Stomphastis
- Species: S. tremina

Binomial name
- Stomphastis tremina Vári, 1961

Species of moth

Stomphastis tremina is a moth of the family Gracillariidae. It is known from South Africa and Namibia.

The larvae feed on Trema orientalis. They mine the leaves of their host plant.
