= Stomphastis horrens =

Scientific classification
- Kingdom: Animalia
- Phylum: Arthropoda
- Class: Insecta
- Order: Lepidoptera
- Family: Gracillariidae
- Genus: Stomphastis
- Species: S. horrens

Binomial name
- Stomphastis horrens (Meyrick, 1932)

Synonyms
- Acrocercops horrens Meyrick, 1932

Species of moth

Stomphastis horrens is a moth of the family Gracillariidae. It is known from Ethiopia.
