= Melanocercops melanommata =

Scientific classification
- Domain: Eukaryota
- Kingdom: Animalia
- Phylum: Arthropoda
- Class: Insecta
- Order: Lepidoptera
- Family: Gracillariidae
- Genus: Melanocercops
- Species: M. melanommata

Binomial name
- Melanocercops melanommata (Turner, 1913)

Synonyms
- Acrocercops melanommata Turner, 1913

Species of moth

Melanocercops melanommata is a moth of the family Gracillariidae. It is known from Queensland, Australia.
