= Artifodina himalaica =

Scientific classification
- Kingdom: Animalia
- Phylum: Arthropoda
- Class: Insecta
- Order: Lepidoptera
- Family: Gracillariidae
- Genus: Artifodina
- Species: A. himalaica

Binomial name
- Artifodina himalaica Kumata, 1985

Species of moth

Artifodina himalaica is a moth of the family Gracillariidae. It is known from Nepal.

The wingspan is 7–11 mm.

The larvae feed on Myrsine semiserrata. They mine the leaves of their host plant.
