= Phrixosceles fibulatrix =

Scientific classification
- Kingdom: Animalia
- Phylum: Arthropoda
- Class: Insecta
- Order: Lepidoptera
- Family: Gracillariidae
- Genus: Phrixosceles
- Species: P. fibulatrix

Binomial name
- Phrixosceles fibulatrix Meyrick, 1922

Species of moth

Phrixosceles fibulatrix is a moth of the family Gracillariidae. It is known from Fiji
