= Acrocercops telestis =

Scientific classification
- Kingdom: Animalia
- Phylum: Arthropoda
- Class: Insecta
- Order: Lepidoptera
- Family: Gracillariidae
- Genus: Acrocercops
- Species: A. telestis

Binomial name
- Acrocercops telestis Meyrick, 1911

Species of moth

Acrocercops telestis is a moth of the family Gracillariidae. It is known from India (Bihar).

The larvae feed on Mallotus repandus, Trewia species (including Trewia nudiflora), Cinnamomum species, Eugenia cumini, Eugenia jambolana and Gmelina arborea. They probably mine the leaves of their host plant.
