= Artifodina japonica =

Scientific classification
- Kingdom: Animalia
- Phylum: Arthropoda
- Class: Insecta
- Order: Lepidoptera
- Family: Gracillariidae
- Genus: Artifodina
- Species: A. japonica

Binomial name
- Artifodina japonica Kumata, 1985

Species of moth

Artifodina japonica is a moth of the family Gracillariidae. It is known from Japan (Honshū, Shikoku).

The wingspan is 7.5–11 millimetres (0.30–0.43 in).
