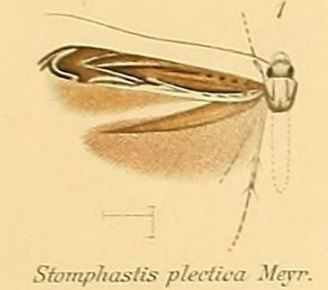
- Stomphastis thraustica

Scientific classification
- Kingdom: Animalia
- Phylum: Arthropoda
- Class: Insecta
- Order: Lepidoptera
- Family: Gracillariidae
- Subfamily: Gracillariinae
- Genus: Stomphastis; Meyrick, 1912

Species
- See text

= Stomphastis =

Genus of moths

Stomphastis is a genus of moths in the family Gracillariidae.

== Species ==
- Stomphastis adesa Triberti, 1988
- Stomphastis aphrocyma (Meyrick, 1918)
- Stomphastis cardamitis (Meyrick, 1921)
- Stomphastis chalybacma (Meyrick, 1908)
- Stomphastis conflua (Meyrick, 1914)
- Stomphastis crotoniphila Vári, 1961
- Stomphastis crotonis Vári, 1961
- Stomphastis dodonaeae Vári, 1961
- Stomphastis eugrapta Vári, 1961
- Stomphastis heringi Vári, 1963
- Stomphastis horrens (Meyrick, 1932)
- Stomphastis labyrinthica (Meyrick, 1918)
- Stomphastis mixograpta Vári, 1961
- Stomphastis polygoni Vári, 1961
- Stomphastis rorkei Vári, 1961
- Stomphastis thraustica (Meyrick, 1908)
- Stomphastis tremina Vári, 1961
