= Acrocercops phaeospora =

Scientific classification
- Domain: Eukaryota
- Kingdom: Animalia
- Phylum: Arthropoda
- Class: Insecta
- Order: Lepidoptera
- Family: Gracillariidae
- Genus: Acrocercops
- Species: A. phaeospora

Binomial name
- Acrocercops phaeospora Meyrick, 1916

Species of moth

Acrocercops phaeospora is a moth of the family Gracillariidae, known from Karnataka, India. It was described by Edward Meyrick in 1916. The hostplants for the species include Vigna mungo, Vigna unguiculata, Cleistocalyx operculatus, Eugenia cumini, Eugenia jambolana, Syzygium littorale, Madhuca latifolia, and Theobroma cacao.
