= Stomphastis eugrapta =

Scientific classification
- Kingdom: Animalia
- Phylum: Arthropoda
- Class: Insecta
- Order: Lepidoptera
- Family: Gracillariidae
- Genus: Stomphastis
- Species: S. eugrapta

Binomial name
- Stomphastis eugrapta Vári, 1961

Species of moth

Stomphastis eugrapta is a moth of the family Gracillariidae. It is found in the regions of South Africa and Madagascar.
