= Artifodina =

Scientific classification
- Kingdom: Animalia
- Phylum: Arthropoda
- Class: Insecta
- Order: Lepidoptera
- Family: Gracillariidae
- Subfamily: Gracillariinae
- Genus: Artifodina; Kumata, 1985

Species
- See text

Genus of moths

Artifodina is a genus of moths in the family Gracillariidae.

== Species ==
- Artifodina himalaica Kumata, 1985
- Artifodina japonica Kumata, 1985
- Artifodina kurokoi Kumata, 1995
- Artifodina siamensis Kumata, 1995
- Artifodina strigulata Kumata, 1985
