= Phrixosceles literaria =

Scientific classification
- Kingdom: Animalia
- Phylum: Arthropoda
- Class: Insecta
- Order: Lepidoptera
- Family: Gracillariidae
- Genus: Phrixosceles
- Species: P. literaria

Binomial name
- Phrixosceles literaria Meyrick, 1908

Species of moth

Phrixosceles literaria is a moth of the family Gracillariidae. It is known from Sri Lanka.
