= Ectropina =

Scientific classification
- Kingdom: Animalia
- Phylum: Arthropoda
- Class: Insecta
- Order: Lepidoptera
- Family: Gracillariidae
- Subfamily: Gracillariinae
- Genus: Ectropina; Vári, 1961

Species
- See text

Genus of moths

Ectropina is a genus of moths in the family Gracillariidae.

== Species ==
- Ectropina acidula (Meyrick, 1911)
- Ectropina citricula (Meyrick, 1912)
- Ectropina ligata (Meyrick, 1912)
- Ectropina raychaudhurii Kumata, 1979
- Ectropina sclerochitoni Vári, 1961
- Ectropina suttoni (Bland, 1980)
