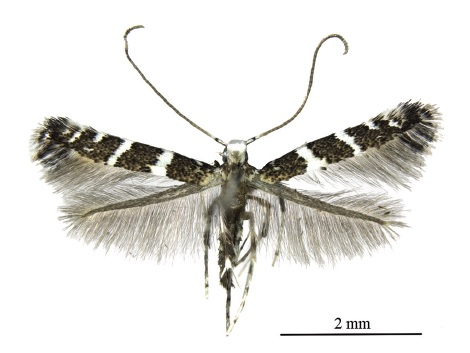
- Telamoptilia grewiae

Scientific classification
- Kingdom: Animalia
- Phylum: Arthropoda
- Class: Insecta
- Order: Lepidoptera
- Family: Gracillariidae
- Subfamily: Acrocercopinae
- Genus: Telamoptilia; Kumata & Kuroko, 1988

Species
- See text

= Telamoptilia =

Genus of moths

Telamoptilia is a genus of moths in the family Gracillariidae.

== Etymology ==
The name is derived from the Greek telamon (belt) and ptilia (small wing).

== Species ==
- Telamoptilia cathedraea (Meyrick, 1908)
- Telamoptilia geyeri (Vári, 1961)
- Telamoptilia grewiae Liu T, Wang S & Li H, 2015
- Telamoptilia hemistacta (Meyrick, 1924)
- Telamoptilia prosacta (Meyrick, 1918)
- Telamoptilia tiliae Kumata & Ermolaev, 1988
