= Stomphastis aphrocyma =

Scientific classification
- Kingdom: Animalia
- Phylum: Arthropoda
- Class: Insecta
- Order: Lepidoptera
- Family: Gracillariidae
- Genus: Stomphastis
- Species: S. aphrocyma

Binomial name
- Stomphastis aphrocyma (Meyrick, 1918)

Synonyms
- Acrocercops aphrocyma Meyrick, 1918

Species of moth

Stomphastis aphrocyma is a moth of the family Gracillariidae. It is known from South Africa and Zimbabwe.

The larvae feed on Croton sylvaticus. They mine the leaves of their host plant.
