= Stomphastis adesa =

Scientific classification
- Kingdom: Animalia
- Phylum: Arthropoda
- Clade: Pancrustacea
- Class: Insecta
- Order: Lepidoptera
- Family: Gracillariidae
- Genus: Stomphastis
- Species: S. adesa

Binomial name
- Stomphastis adesa Triberti, 1988

Species of moth

Stomphastis adesa is a moth of the family Gracillariidae. It is known from Madagascar and Nigeria.
