= Stomphastis cardamitis =

Scientific classification
- Kingdom: Animalia
- Phylum: Arthropoda
- Class: Insecta
- Order: Lepidoptera
- Family: Gracillariidae
- Genus: Stomphastis
- Species: S. cardamitis

Binomial name
- Stomphastis cardamitis (Meyrick, 1921)

Synonyms
- Parectopa cardamitis Meyrick, 1921

Species of moth

Stomphastis cardamitis is a moth of the family Gracillariidae. It is known from South Africa and Namibia.

The larvae feed on Croton subgratissimus. They mine the leaves of their host plant.
