= Artifodina siamensis =

Scientific classification
- Kingdom: Animalia
- Phylum: Arthropoda
- Clade: Pancrustacea
- Class: Insecta
- Order: Lepidoptera
- Family: Gracillariidae
- Genus: Artifodina
- Species: A. siamensis

Binomial name
- Artifodina siamensis Kumata, 1995

Species of moth

Artifodina siamensis is a moth of the family Gracillariidae. It is known from Thailand.

The food plant is unknown, but is probably very closely related to Myrsine semiserata.
