= Ectropina sclerochitoni =

Scientific classification
- Kingdom: Animalia
- Phylum: Arthropoda
- Class: Insecta
- Order: Lepidoptera
- Family: Gracillariidae
- Genus: Ectropina
- Species: E. sclerochitoni

Binomial name
- Ectropina sclerochitoni Vári, 1961

Species of moth

Ectropina sclerochitoni is a moth of the family Gracillariidae. It is known from Nigeria and South Africa.

The larvae feed on Sclerochiton harveyanus. They probably mine the leaves of their host plant.
