= Ectropina ligata =

Scientific classification
- Kingdom: Animalia
- Phylum: Arthropoda
- Class: Insecta
- Order: Lepidoptera
- Family: Gracillariidae
- Genus: Ectropina
- Species: E. ligata

Binomial name
- Ectropina ligata (Meyrick, 1912)

Synonyms
- Gracilaria ligata Meyrick, 1912

Species of moth

Ectropina ligata is a moth of the family Gracillariidae. It is known from South Africa and Namibia.
