= Stomphastis conflua =

Scientific classification
- Kingdom: Animalia
- Phylum: Arthropoda
- Class: Insecta
- Order: Lepidoptera
- Family: Gracillariidae
- Genus: Stomphastis
- Species: S. conflua

Binomial name
- Stomphastis conflua (Meyrick, 1914)

Synonyms
- Acrocercops conflua Meyrick, 1914

Species of moth

Stomphastis conflua is a moth of the family Gracillariidae. It is known from Cyprus, the Caucasus, Israel, the Palestinian Territory, Saudi Arabia, Jordan, Egypt, Zimbabwe, Nigeria, Sudan, Mozambique and South Africa.

The larvae feed on Ricinus communis. They mine the leaves of their host plant.
