= Artifodina strigulata =

Scientific classification
- Kingdom: Animalia
- Phylum: Arthropoda
- Class: Insecta
- Order: Lepidoptera
- Family: Gracillariidae
- Genus: Artifodina
- Species: A. strigulata

Binomial name
- Artifodina strigulata Kumata, 1985

Species of moth

Artifodina strigulata is a moth of the family Gracillariidae. It is known from Meghalaya, India, and from Nepal.

The wingspan is 8.2-11.5 mm.
