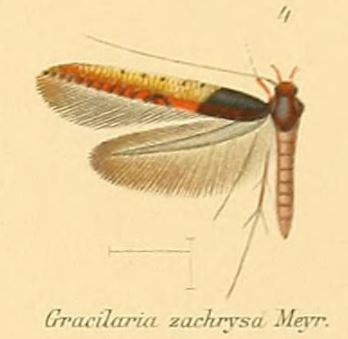

Scientific classification
- Kingdom: Animalia
- Phylum: Arthropoda
- Class: Insecta
- Order: Lepidoptera
- Family: Gracillariidae
- Genus: Caloptilia
- Species: C. zachrysa

Binomial name
- Caloptilia zachrysa (Meyrick, 1907)

Synonyms
- Gracilaria zachrysa Meyrick, 1907

= Caloptilia zachrysa =

Species of moth

Caloptilia zachrysa is a moth of the family Gracillariidae. It is known from China, India, Japan (the islands of Honshū and Kyūshū), Korea, Sri Lanka and Taiwan.

The wingspan is 10.2–13.2 mm.

The larvae feed on Rhododendron indicum, Malus pumila, Malus sylvestris, Photinia species (including Photinia glabra), Prunus persica and Rubus species. They mine the leaves of their host plant.
