= Acrocercops quadrisecta =

Scientific classification
- Kingdom: Animalia
- Phylum: Arthropoda
- Clade: Pancrustacea
- Class: Insecta
- Order: Lepidoptera
- Family: Gracillariidae
- Genus: Acrocercops
- Species: A. quadrisecta

Binomial name
- Acrocercops quadrisecta Meyrick, 1932

Species of moth

Acrocercops quadrisecta is a moth of the family Gracillariidae. It is found in India (Maharashtra and Maharashtra).

The larvae feed on Bridelia retusa and Bridelia stipularis. They probably mine the leaves of their host plant.
