= Phrixosceles pteridograpta =

Scientific classification
- Kingdom: Animalia
- Phylum: Arthropoda
- Class: Insecta
- Order: Lepidoptera
- Family: Gracillariidae
- Genus: Phrixosceles
- Species: P. pteridograpta

Binomial name
- Phrixosceles pteridograpta Meyrick, 1935

Species of moth

Phrixosceles pteridograpta is a moth of the family Gracillariidae. It is known from Maharashtra, India.
