= Borboryctis triplaca =

Scientific classification
- Kingdom: Animalia
- Phylum: Arthropoda
- Class: Insecta
- Order: Lepidoptera
- Family: Gracillariidae
- Genus: Borboryctis
- Species: B. triplaca

Binomial name
- Borboryctis triplaca (Meyrick, 1908)

Synonyms
- Acrocercops triplaca Meyrick, 1908

Species of moth

Borboryctis triplaca is a moth of the family Gracillariidae. It is native to Japan (Honshū) and India (Meghalaya).

The wingspan is 11.7–12.3 millimetres (0.46–0.48 in).
