= Caloptilia theivora =

Scientific classification
- Domain: Eukaryota
- Kingdom: Animalia
- Phylum: Arthropoda
- Class: Insecta
- Order: Lepidoptera
- Family: Gracillariidae
- Genus: Caloptilia
- Species: C. theivora

Binomial name
- Caloptilia theivora (Walsingham, 1891)

Synonyms
- Gracilaria theivora Walsingham, 1891; Gracilaria theaevora; Caloptilia theivola Kamijo, 1994

Species of moth

Caloptilia theivora is a moth of the family Gracillariidae. It is known from Brunei, China (Zhejiang, Gansu, Guangdong, Guanxi, Guizhou, Hainan, Henan, Hubei, Hunan, Jiangxi, Sichuan, Yunnan, Anhui and Fujian), Hong Kong, India, Indonesia (Java), Japan (Kyūshū, Shikoku, Honshū), Korea, Malaysia (West Malaysia), Sri Lanka, Taiwan, Thailand and Vietnam.

The wingspan is 10–14 mm.

The larvae feed on Camellia japonica, Camellia sasanqua, Camellia theifera and Thea species, including Thea sinensis. They mine the leaves of their host plant.
