= Acrocercops auricilla =

Scientific classification
- Kingdom: Animalia
- Phylum: Arthropoda
- Clade: Pancrustacea
- Class: Insecta
- Order: Lepidoptera
- Family: Gracillariidae
- Genus: Acrocercops
- Species: A. auricilla

Binomial name
- Acrocercops auricilla (Stainton, 1859)

Species of moth

Acrocercops auricilla is a moth of the family Gracillariidae, known from West Bengal, India. The hostplant for the species is Swietenia mahagoni.
