= Phrixosceles hydrocosma =

Scientific classification
- Kingdom: Animalia
- Phylum: Arthropoda
- Class: Insecta
- Order: Lepidoptera
- Family: Gracillariidae
- Genus: Phrixosceles
- Species: P. hydrocosma

Binomial name
- Phrixosceles hydrocosma Meyrick, 1908

Species of moth

Phrixosceles hydrocosma is a moth of the family Gracillariidae. It is known from Meghalaya, India.
