= Stomphastis labyrinthica =

Scientific classification
- Kingdom: Animalia
- Phylum: Arthropoda
- Class: Insecta
- Order: Lepidoptera
- Family: Gracillariidae
- Genus: Stomphastis
- Species: S. labyrinthica

Binomial name
- Stomphastis labyrinthica (Meyrick, 1918)

Species of moth

Stomphastis labyrinthica is a moth of the family Gracillariidae. It is known from India (Bihar) and Japan (Kyūshū).

The larvae feed on Guazuma tomentosa, Guazuma ulmifolia and Trema (including Trema orientalis). They probably mine the leaves of their host plant.
