= Acrocercops astiopa =

Scientific classification
- Kingdom: Animalia
- Phylum: Arthropoda
- Class: Insecta
- Order: Lepidoptera
- Family: Gracillariidae
- Genus: Acrocercops
- Species: A. astiopa

Binomial name
- Acrocercops astiopa Meyrick, 1930

Species of moth

Acrocercops astiopa is a moth of the family Gracillariidae, known from Bihar, India. The hostplant for the species is Polyalthia longifolia.
