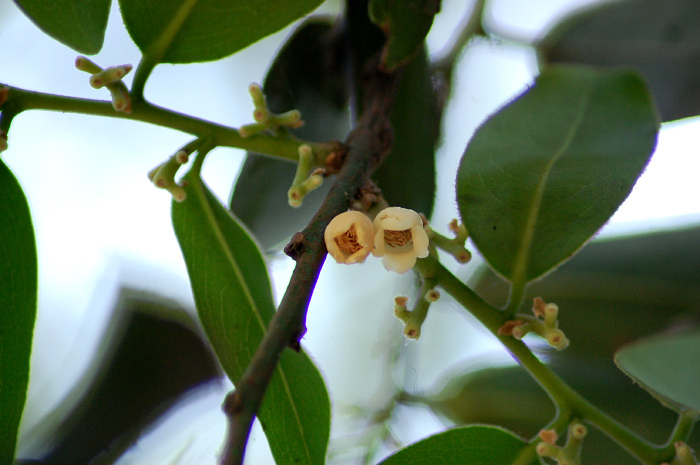
- Foliage and flowers

Conservation status
- Least Concern (IUCN 3.1)

Scientific classification
- Kingdom: Plantae
- Clade: Embryophytes
- Clade: Tracheophytes
- Clade: Spermatophytes
- Clade: Angiosperms
- Clade: Eudicots
- Clade: Asterids
- Order: Ericales
- Family: Ebenaceae
- Genus: Diospyros
- Species: D. malabarica

Binomial name
- Diospyros malabarica (Desr.) Kostel.

Synonyms
- D. biflora Blanco; D. citrifolia Wall. ex A.DC.; D. embryopteris Pers. [Illegitimate]; D. glutinifera (Roxb.) Wall.; D. glutinosa J.König ex Roxb.; D. malabarica var. siamensis (Hochr.) Phengklai; D. peregrina (Gaertn.) Gürke; D. peregrina f. javanica Kosterm.; D. siamensis Hochr.; Embryopteris gelatinifera G.Don; Embryopteris glutinifera Roxb.; Embryopteris glutinifolia Link; Embryopteris peregrina Gaertn.

= Diospyros malabarica =

Species of flowering plant

Diospyros malabarica, the gaub tree, Malabar ebony, black-and-white ebony or pale moon ebony, is a species of flowering tree in the family Ebenaceae that is native to the Indian subcontinent and South East Asia.

It is a long-lived, very slow-growing tree, which can reach up to 35 m in height with a black trunk up to 70 cm in diameter. It is an evergreen tree with white or green flowers. The tree is found in lowland rainforests, primarily along rivers and streams.

== Fruit ==
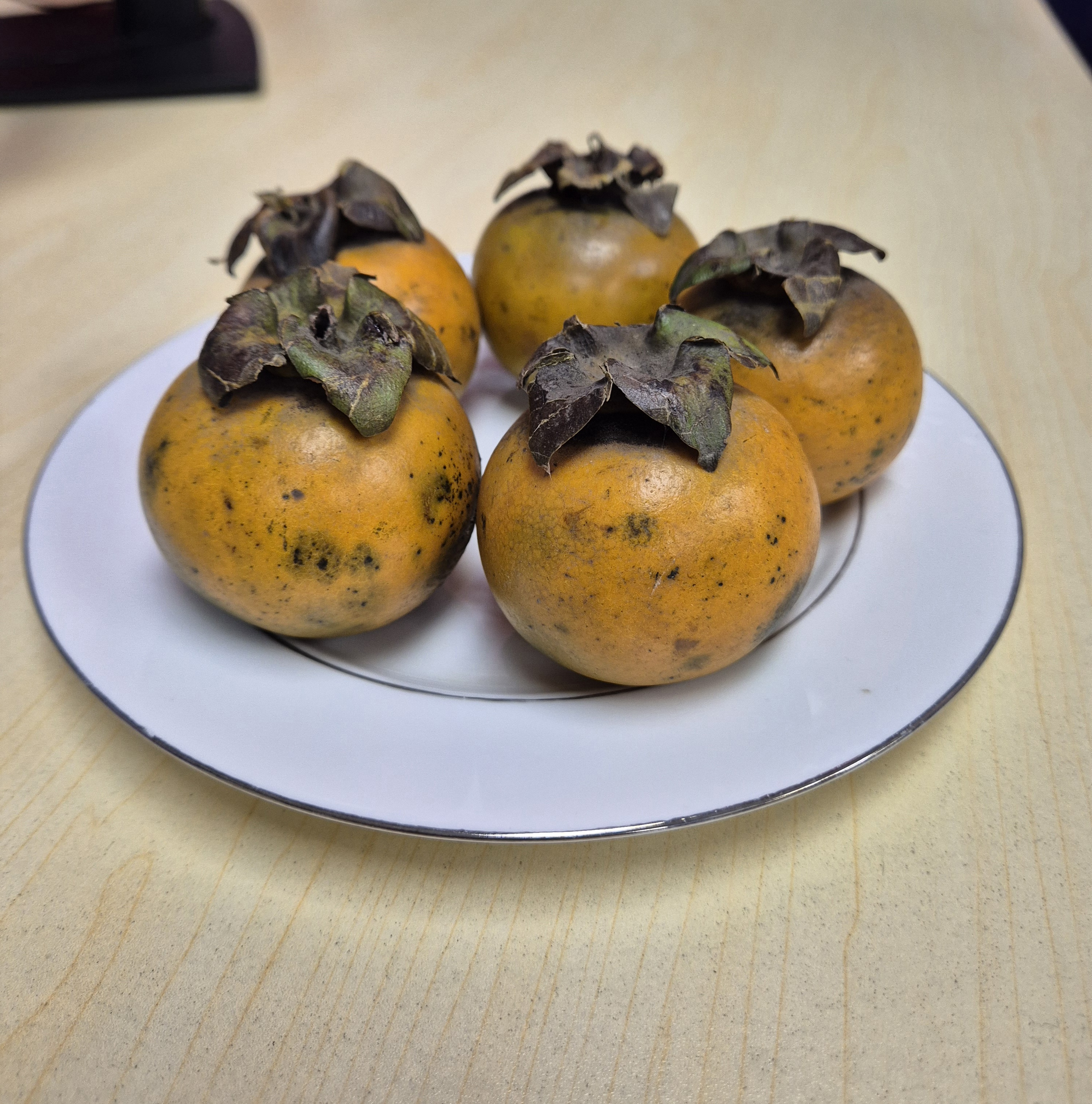
Ripe Diospyros malabarica fruits on a plate, a tropical species native to South Asia and commonly found in Bangladesh.

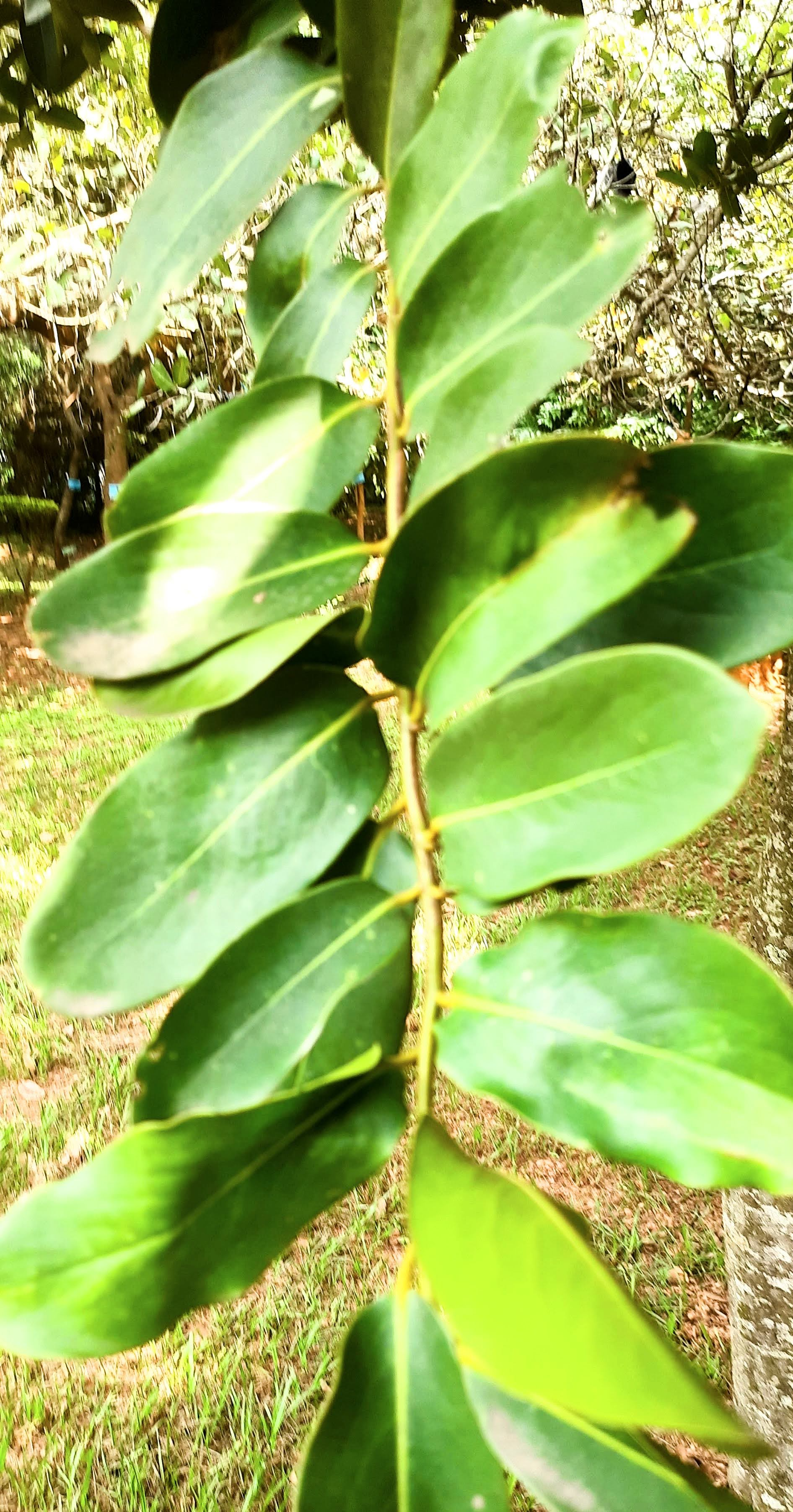
River Ebony leaves Bengaluru

The fruits are round, and yellow when ripe. It may be somewhat often astringent, even when ripe. Its common name is derived from the coast of southwestern India, Malabar. It is the provincial tree of Ang Thong Province in Thailand.

== Uses ==
Both the bark of the tree and the unripe fruit have medicinal uses in Ayurveda. This tree was mentioned as Tinduka by Sanskrit writers.

Unripe leaves and fruits were traditionally used to dye cloth black.

The wood is sometimes used in guitar and high-end furniture manufacturing for its distinctive black striped on off-white to golden beige background appearance. Trade names for timber and wooden products are "Pale moon ebony", "Royal white ebony" and "Black and white ebony".

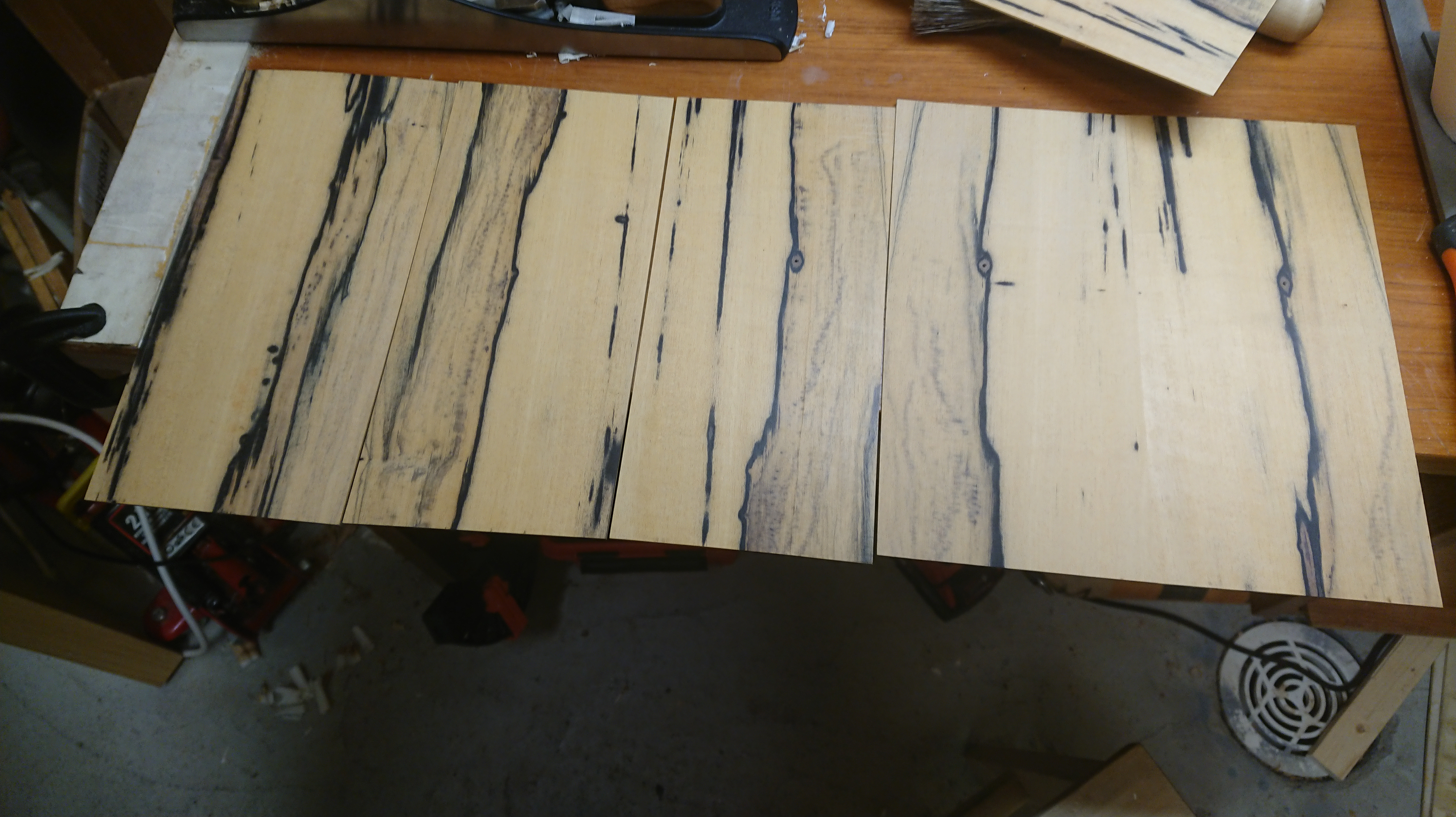
5 pcs of Diospyros malabarica veneer sheets. Size is 250*120*2 mm. These veneers are sawcut at a bandsaw then sanded.
