= Melanocercops desiccata =

Scientific classification
- Kingdom: Animalia
- Phylum: Arthropoda
- Class: Insecta
- Order: Lepidoptera
- Family: Gracillariidae
- Genus: Melanocercops
- Species: M. desiccata

Binomial name
- Melanocercops desiccata (Meyrick, 1916)

Synonyms
- Acrocercops desiccata Meyrick, 1916

Species of moth

Melanocercops desiccata is a moth of the family Gracillariidae. It is known from Bihar, India and from Sri Lanka.

The larvae feed on Ficus glomerata and Ficus racemosa. They probably mine the leaves of their host plant.
