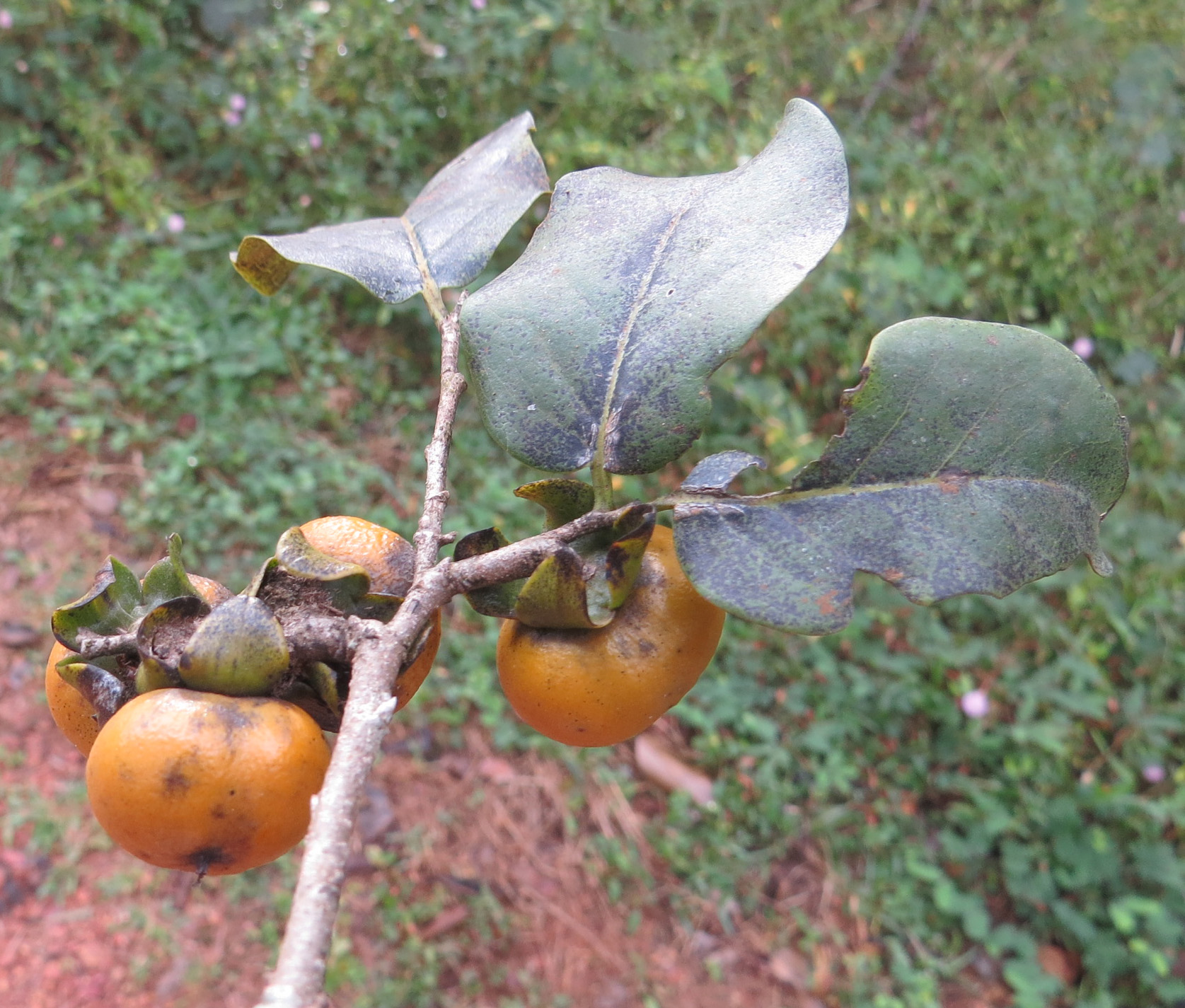

Conservation status
- Least Concern (IUCN 3.1)

Scientific classification
- Kingdom: Plantae
- Clade: Tracheophytes
- Clade: Angiosperms
- Clade: Eudicots
- Clade: Asterids
- Order: Ericales
- Family: Ebenaceae
- Genus: Diospyros
- Species: D. montana

Binomial name
- Diospyros montana Roxb.

Synonyms
- Diospyros auriculata Wight ex Hiern

= Diospyros montana =

Bombay ebony

Species of tree

Diospyros montana, the Bombay ebony, is a small deciduous tree in the ebony family up to 15 metres (49 ft) tall, distributed all along the Western Ghats of India, Sri Lanka, Indo-China through to Australia.

== External resources ==
- Britannica
- Diospyros montana
- Media related to Diospyros montana at Wikimedia Commons
- Data related to Diospyros montana at Wikispecies
