= Melanocercops elaphopa =

Scientific classification
- Kingdom: Animalia
- Phylum: Arthropoda
- Class: Insecta
- Order: Lepidoptera
- Family: Gracillariidae
- Genus: Melanocercops
- Species: M. elaphopa

Binomial name
- Melanocercops elaphopa (Meyrick, 1914)

Synonyms
- Acrocercops elaphopa Meyrick, 1914

Species of moth

Melanocercops elaphopa is a moth of the family Gracillariidae. It is known from Karnataka, India, and from Nepal.

The larvae feed on Ficus species, including Ficus asperrima, Ficus palmatus and Ficus religiosa. They mine the leaves of their host plant.
