= Dekeidoryxis maesae =

Scientific classification
- Kingdom: Animalia
- Phylum: Arthropoda
- Class: Insecta
- Order: Lepidoptera
- Family: Gracillariidae
- Genus: Dekeidoryxis
- Species: D. maesae

Binomial name
- Dekeidoryxis maesae Kumata, 1989

Species of moth

Dekeidoryxis maesae is a moth of the family Gracillariidae. It is known from India (West Bengal) and Nepal.

The wingspan is 6.3–7.6 mm.

The larvae feed on Maesa chisia and Maesa macrophylla. They probably mine the leaves of their host plant.
