= Caloptilia perisphena =

Scientific classification
- Kingdom: Animalia
- Phylum: Arthropoda
- Class: Insecta
- Order: Lepidoptera
- Family: Gracillariidae
- Genus: Caloptilia
- Species: C. perisphena

Binomial name
- Caloptilia perisphena (Meyrick, 1905)

Species of moth

Caloptilia perisphena is a moth of the family Gracillariidae. It is known from Sichuan, China; Tamil Nadu, India; and Sri Lanka.
