= Acrocercops strophala =

Scientific classification
- Domain: Eukaryota
- Kingdom: Animalia
- Phylum: Arthropoda
- Class: Insecta
- Order: Lepidoptera
- Family: Gracillariidae
- Genus: Acrocercops
- Species: A. strophala

Binomial name
- Acrocercops strophala Meyrick, 1908

Species of moth

Acrocercops strophala is a moth of the family Gracillariidae. It is commonly found in India (Assam, Maharashtra, Meghalaya), Indonesia (Java), Samoa, Guadalcanal and Sri Lanka.

The larvae feed on Glochidion lanceolarium. They mine the leaves of their host plant.
