= Caloptilia syrphetias =

Scientific classification
- Kingdom: Animalia
- Phylum: Arthropoda
- Class: Insecta
- Order: Lepidoptera
- Family: Gracillariidae
- Genus: Caloptilia
- Species: C. syrphetias

Binomial name
- Caloptilia syrphetias (Meyrick, 1907)

Synonyms
- Caloptilia perseella Kumata, 1982; Caloptilia zopherotarsa (Meyrick, 1936)

Species of moth

Caloptilia syrphetias is a moth of the family Gracillariidae. It is known from Brunei, China (Sichuan, Fujian, Hubei), Hong Kong, India, Indonesia (Sulawesi), Japan (Honshū, Kyūshū, the Ryukyu Islands), Malaysia (Pahang), Sri Lanka and Thailand.

The wingspan is 13.5-16.5 mm.

The larvae feed on Persea thunbergii. They mine the leaves of their host plant.
