= Acrocercops zopherandra =

Scientific classification
- Kingdom: Animalia
- Phylum: Arthropoda
- Class: Insecta
- Order: Lepidoptera
- Family: Gracillariidae
- Genus: Acrocercops
- Species: A. zopherandra

Binomial name
- Acrocercops zopherandra Meyrick, 1931

Species of moth

Acrocercops zopherandra is a moth of the family Gracillariidae. It is known from India (Bihar).

The larvae feed on Mallotus repandus. They probably mine the leaves of their host plant.
