= Ectropina raychaudhurii =

Scientific classification
- Kingdom: Animalia
- Phylum: Arthropoda
- Class: Insecta
- Order: Lepidoptera
- Family: Gracillariidae
- Genus: Ectropina
- Species: E. raychaudhurii

Binomial name
- Ectropina raychaudhurii Kumata, 1979

Species of moth

Ectropina raychaudhurii is a species of moth of the family Gracillariidae. It is known from Tamil Nadu, India.

The wingspan is 5.3-6.6 mm.

The larvae feed on Phyllanthus niruri. They mine the leaves of their host plant.
