= Caloptilia ariana =

Scientific classification
- Kingdom: Animalia
- Phylum: Arthropoda
- Class: Insecta
- Order: Lepidoptera
- Family: Gracillariidae
- Genus: Caloptilia
- Species: C. ariana

Binomial name
- Caloptilia ariana (Meyrick, 1914)

Synonyms
- Caloptilia heliciae Kumata, 1966

Species of moth

Caloptilia ariana is a moth of the family Gracillariidae. It is known from India, Indonesia (Sulawesi), Japan (Ryukyu Islands, Kyūshū), Malaysia (Sabah), Sri Lanka and Thailand.

The wingspan is 10–13 mm.

The larvae feed on Helicia cochinchinensis. They probably mine the leaves of their host plant.
