= Phyllonorycter conformis =

Scientific classification
- Kingdom: Animalia
- Phylum: Arthropoda
- Class: Insecta
- Order: Lepidoptera
- Family: Gracillariidae
- Genus: Phyllonorycter
- Species: P. conformis

Binomial name
- Phyllonorycter conformis (Meyrick, 1910)

Species of moth

Phyllonorycter conformis is a moth of the family Gracillariidae. It is known from Himachal Pradesh, India and from Nepal.
