= Melanocercops cyclopa =

Scientific classification
- Kingdom: Animalia
- Phylum: Arthropoda
- Class: Insecta
- Order: Lepidoptera
- Family: Gracillariidae
- Genus: Melanocercops
- Species: M. cyclopa

Binomial name
- Melanocercops cyclopa (Meyrick, 1908)

Synonyms
- Acrocercops cyclopa Meyrick, 1908

Species of moth

Melanocercops cyclopa is a moth of the family Gracillariidae. It is known from West Bengal, India.
