= Telamoptilia prosacta =

Scientific classification
- Domain: Eukaryota
- Kingdom: Animalia
- Phylum: Arthropoda
- Class: Insecta
- Order: Lepidoptera
- Family: Gracillariidae
- Genus: Telamoptilia
- Species: T. prosacta

Binomial name
- Telamoptilia prosacta (Meyrick, 1918)

Synonyms
- Acrocercops prosacta Meyrick, 1918

Species of insect

Telamoptilia prosacta is a moth of the family Gracillariidae. It is known from Thailand, Taiwan, Indonesia (Java), India (Bihar), Japan (the Ryukyu Islands) and Fiji.

The wingspan is 6.5–8 mm.

The larvae feed on Ipomoea species, including Ipomoea batatas. They mine the leaves of their host plant. It has not been recorded as a severe pest.
