= Phyllonorycter incurvata =

Scientific classification
- Kingdom: Animalia
- Phylum: Arthropoda
- Class: Insecta
- Order: Lepidoptera
- Family: Gracillariidae
- Genus: Phyllonorycter
- Species: P. incurvata

Binomial name
- Phyllonorycter incurvata (Meyrick, 1916)

Species of moth

Phyllonorycter incurvata is a moth of the family Gracillariidae. It is known from Karnataka, India.

The larvae feed on Strobilanthes species, including Strobilanthes callosus. They probably mine the leaves of their host plant.
