= Borboryctis =

Scientific classification
- Kingdom: Animalia
- Phylum: Arthropoda
- Class: Insecta
- Order: Lepidoptera
- Family: Gracillariidae
- Subfamily: Acrocercopinae
- Genus: Borboryctis; Kumata & Kurokoo, 1988

Species
- See text

Genus of moths

Borboryctis is a genus of moths in the family Gracillariidae.

== Etymology ==
The genus name is derived from the Greek borbos (meaning fleshy, swollen) and oryctis (digger, miner).

== Species ==
- Borboryctis euryae Kumata & Kuroko, 1988
- Borboryctis triplaca (Meyrick, 1908)
