= Acrocercops supplex =

Scientific classification
- Domain: Eukaryota
- Kingdom: Animalia
- Phylum: Arthropoda
- Class: Insecta
- Order: Lepidoptera
- Family: Gracillariidae
- Genus: Acrocercops
- Species: A. supplex

Binomial name
- Acrocercops supplex Meyrick, 1918

Species of moth

Acrocercops supplex is a moth of the family Gracillariidae. It is known from India (Bihar).

The larvae feed on Terminalia bellirica and Terminalia catappa. They probably mine the leaves of their host plant.
