= Acrocercops chrysophila =

Scientific classification
- Kingdom: Animalia
- Phylum: Arthropoda
- Class: Insecta
- Order: Lepidoptera
- Family: Gracillariidae
- Genus: Acrocercops
- Species: A. chrysophila

Binomial name
- Acrocercops chrysophila Meyrick, 1937

Species of moth

Acrocercops chrysophila is a moth of the family Gracillariidae, known to be from Uttarakhand, India. It was described by E. Meyrick in 1937. The hostplants for the species include Eugenia cumini and Eugenia jambolana.
