= Acrocercops praeclusa =

Scientific classification
- Kingdom: Animalia
- Phylum: Arthropoda
- Class: Insecta
- Order: Lepidoptera
- Family: Gracillariidae
- Genus: Acrocercops
- Species: A. praeclusa

Binomial name
- Acrocercops praeclusa Meyrick, 1914

Species of moth

Acrocercops praeclusa is a moth of the family Gracillariidae, known from Karnataka and Bihar, India, as well as Sri Lanka. It was described by Edward Meyrick in 1914. The hostplants for the species include Lannea coromandelica and Odina wodier.
