= Polygonum glabrum =

Polygonum glabrum can refer to:

- Polygonum glabrum Rchb., a synonym of Persicaria lapathifolia (L.) Delarbre
- Polygonum glabrum Roxb., a synonym of Persicaria decipiens (R.Br.) K.L.Wilson
  - Polygonum glabrum Roxb. ex D.Don, a synonym of Persicaria decipiens (R.Br.) K.L.Wilson
- Polygonum glabrum Willd., a synonym of Persicaria glabra (Willd.) M.Gómez
