= Phyllonorycter philerasta =

Scientific classification
- Kingdom: Animalia
- Phylum: Arthropoda
- Class: Insecta
- Order: Lepidoptera
- Family: Gracillariidae
- Genus: Phyllonorycter
- Species: P. philerasta

Binomial name
- Phyllonorycter philerasta (Meyrick, 1922)

Synonyms
- Phyllonorycter philerata

Species of moth

Phyllonorycter philerasta is a moth of the family Gracillariidae. It is known from the Punjab region of what was then India.
