= Acrocercops leucophaea =

Scientific classification
- Domain: Eukaryota
- Kingdom: Animalia
- Phylum: Arthropoda
- Class: Insecta
- Order: Lepidoptera
- Family: Gracillariidae
- Genus: Acrocercops
- Species: A. leucophaea

Binomial name
- Acrocercops leucophaea Meyrick, 1919

Species of moth

Acrocercops leucophaea is a moth of the family Gracillariidae, known from Uttarakhand and Assam, India and Nepal. It was described by Edward Meyrick in 1919. The hostplants for the species include Lyonia ovalifolia and Engelhardia spicata.
