= Acrocercops triscalma =

Scientific classification
- Kingdom: Animalia
- Phylum: Arthropoda
- Clade: Pancrustacea
- Class: Insecta
- Order: Lepidoptera
- Family: Gracillariidae
- Genus: Acrocercops
- Species: A. triscalma

Binomial name
- Acrocercops triscalma Meyrick, 1916

Species of moth

Acrocercops triscalma is a moth of the family Gracillariidae. It is known from India (Karnataka).

The larvae feed on Moullava spicata. They probably mine the leaves of their host plant.
