= Acrocercops nitidula =

Scientific classification
- Kingdom: Animalia
- Phylum: Arthropoda
- Clade: Pancrustacea
- Class: Insecta
- Order: Lepidoptera
- Family: Gracillariidae
- Genus: Acrocercops
- Species: A. nitidula

Binomial name
- Acrocercops nitidula (Stainton, 1862)

Species of moth

Acrocercops nitidula is a moth of the family Gracillariidae, known from West Bengal, India. It was described by Henry Tibbats Stainton in 1919.
