= Caloptilia isochrysa =

Scientific classification
- Kingdom: Animalia
- Phylum: Arthropoda
- Class: Insecta
- Order: Lepidoptera
- Family: Gracillariidae
- Genus: Caloptilia
- Species: C. isochrysa

Binomial name
- Caloptilia isochrysa (Meyrick, 1908)

Synonyms
- Caloptilia solaris Kumata, 1966

Species of moth

Caloptilia isochrysa is a moth of the family Gracillariidae. It is known from the state of Meghalaya in India, the islands of Honshū, Kyūshū and Ryukyu in Japan and from Nepal.

The wingspan is 14–15 mm.

The larvae feed on Cleyeria japonica. They likely mine the leaves of their host plant.
