= Ectropina acidula =

Scientific classification
- Kingdom: Animalia
- Phylum: Arthropoda
- Class: Insecta
- Order: Lepidoptera
- Family: Gracillariidae
- Genus: Ectropina
- Species: E. acidula

Binomial name
- Ectropina acidula (Meyrick, 1911)

Synonyms
- Gracilaria acidula Meyrick, 1911; Acrocercops acidula

Species of moth

Ectropina acidula is a moth of the family Gracillariidae. It is known from Bihar, India.

The wingspan is 6–6.2 mm.

The larvae feed on Phyllanthus emblica. They probably mine the leaves of their host plant.
