= Dekeidoryxis asynacta =

Scientific classification
- Kingdom: Animalia
- Phylum: Arthropoda
- Class: Insecta
- Order: Lepidoptera
- Family: Gracillariidae
- Genus: Dekeidoryxis
- Species: D. asynacta

Binomial name
- Dekeidoryxis asynacta (Meyrick, 1918)

Synonyms
- Parectopa asynacta Meyrick, 1918

Species of moth

Dekeidoryxis asynacta is a moth of the family Gracillariidae. It is known from the state of Assam in India and from Nepal.

The wingspan is 5.3–7.8 mm.

The larvae feed on Maesa chisia. They probably mine the leaves of their host plant.
