= Melanocercops ficuvorella =

Scientific classification
- Domain: Eukaryota
- Kingdom: Animalia
- Phylum: Arthropoda
- Class: Insecta
- Order: Lepidoptera
- Family: Gracillariidae
- Genus: Melanocercops
- Species: M. ficuvorella

Binomial name
- Melanocercops ficuvorella (Yazaki, 1926)

Synonyms
- Acrocercops ficuvorella Yazaki, 1926

Species of moth

Melanocercops ficuvorella is a moth of the family Gracillariidae. It is known from Guangdong, China, and from India and Japan (Shikoku, Honshū, the Amami Islands, Tusima, the Ryukyu Islands and Kyūshū).

The wingspan is 6-8.2 mm.

The larvae feed on Ficus carica, Ficus erecta, Ficus hispida, Ficus microcarpa, Ficus nipponica, Ficus pumila, Ficus virens and Ficus virgata. They probably mine the leaves of their host plant.
