= Acrocercops diacentrota =

Scientific classification
- Kingdom: Animalia
- Phylum: Arthropoda
- Class: Insecta
- Order: Lepidoptera
- Family: Gracillariidae
- Genus: Acrocercops
- Species: A. diacentrota

Binomial name
- Acrocercops diacentrota Meyrick, 1935

Species of moth

Acrocercops diacentrota is a moth of the family Gracillariidae, known from West Bengal, India. It was described by Edward Meyrick in 1935. The hostplant for the species is Michelia champaca.
