= Phrixosceles phricotarsa =

Scientific classification
- Kingdom: Animalia
- Phylum: Arthropoda
- Class: Insecta
- Order: Lepidoptera
- Family: Gracillariidae
- Genus: Phrixosceles
- Species: P. phricotarsa

Binomial name
- Phrixosceles phricotarsa Meyrick, 1916

Species of moth

Phrixosceles phricotarsa is a moth of the family Gracillariidae. It is known from Tamil Nadu, India.
