= Phyllonorycter clepsiphaga =

Scientific classification
- Kingdom: Animalia
- Phylum: Arthropoda
- Class: Insecta
- Order: Lepidoptera
- Family: Gracillariidae
- Genus: Phyllonorycter
- Species: P. clepsiphaga

Binomial name
- Phyllonorycter clepsiphaga (Meyrick, 1922)

Species of moth

Phyllonorycter clepsiphaga is a moth of the family Gracillariidae. It is known from Assam and Meghalaya, India.

The host plant is unknown, but the larvae make a blotch mine on the upperside of the leaf.
