= Phyllonorycter epichares =

Scientific classification
- Kingdom: Animalia
- Phylum: Arthropoda
- Class: Insecta
- Order: Lepidoptera
- Family: Gracillariidae
- Genus: Phyllonorycter
- Species: P. epichares

Binomial name
- Phyllonorycter epichares (Meyrick, 1928)

Species of moth

Phyllonorycter epichares is a moth of the family Gracillariidae. It is known from Assam, India.

The larvae feed on Malus species, including Malus pumila. They probably mine the leaves of their host plant.
