= Acrocercops irradians =

Scientific classification
- Kingdom: Animalia
- Phylum: Arthropoda
- Class: Insecta
- Order: Lepidoptera
- Family: Gracillariidae
- Genus: Acrocercops
- Species: A. irradians

Binomial name
- Acrocercops irradians Meyrick, 1931

Species of moth

Acrocercops irradians is a moth of the family Gracillariidae, known from Maharashtra, India, as well as Taiwan. It was described by Edward Meyrick in 1931. The hostplant for the species is Zingiber officinale.
