= Acrocercops rhothogramma =

Scientific classification
- Domain: Eukaryota
- Kingdom: Animalia
- Phylum: Arthropoda
- Class: Insecta
- Order: Lepidoptera
- Family: Gracillariidae
- Genus: Acrocercops
- Species: A. rhothogramma

Binomial name
- Acrocercops rhothogramma T. B. Fletcher, 1933

Species of moth

Acrocercops rhothogramma is a moth of the family Gracillariidae. It was described by Thomas Bainbrigge Fletcher in 1933 and is known from Bihar, India.

The larvae feed on Breynia rhamnoides and Breynia vitis-idaea. They probably mine the leaves of their host plant.
