= Acrocercops euthycolona =

Scientific classification
- Kingdom: Animalia
- Phylum: Arthropoda
- Class: Insecta
- Order: Lepidoptera
- Family: Gracillariidae
- Genus: Acrocercops
- Species: A. euthycolona

Binomial name
- Acrocercops euthycolona Meyrick, 1931

Species of moth

Acrocercops euthycolona is a moth of the family Gracillariidae, known from Maharashtra, India, as well as Brunei Darussalam, Indonesia, Malaysia, the Solomon Islands, Sri Lanka, and Vanuatu. It was described by Edward Meyrick in 1931.

The hostplants for the species include Anacardium occidentale, Madhuca indica, Madhuca latifolia, Mimusops elengi, and Mimusops elengi. They mine the leaves of their host plant. The mine has the form of a large ovate blotch mine under the upper cuticle of the leaf. It is pinkish, shining and opaque.
