= Caloptilia recitata =

Scientific classification
- Kingdom: Animalia
- Phylum: Arthropoda
- Class: Insecta
- Order: Lepidoptera
- Family: Gracillariidae
- Genus: Caloptilia
- Species: C. recitata

Binomial name
- Caloptilia recitata (Meyrick, 1918)

Synonyms
- Gracilaria recitata Meyrick, 1918

Species of moth

Caloptilia recitata is a moth of the family Gracillariidae. It is known from China (Sichuan, Jiangxi, Fujian, Hunan, Guizhou), Hong Kong, India (Meghalaya, Assam), Japan (Honshū, the Ryukyu Islands, Shikoku, Kyūshū) and Nepal.

The wingspan is 10–13 mm.

The larvae feed on Cotinus coggygria, Rhus javanica, Toxicodendron sylvestre and Toxicodendron trichocarpum. They mine the leaves of their host plant.
