= Acrocercops tricyma =

Scientific classification
- Domain: Eukaryota
- Kingdom: Animalia
- Phylum: Arthropoda
- Class: Insecta
- Order: Lepidoptera
- Family: Gracillariidae
- Genus: Acrocercops
- Species: A. tricyma

Binomial name
- Acrocercops tricyma Meyrick, 1908

Species of moth

Acrocercops tricyma is a moth of the family Gracillariidae. It is known from India (Bihar, Meghalaya) and Madagascar.

The larvae feed on Blumea species, including Blumea balsamifera and Blumea lacera. They probably mine the leaves of their host plant.
