= Phyllonorycter ganodes =

Scientific classification
- Kingdom: Animalia
- Phylum: Arthropoda
- Class: Insecta
- Order: Lepidoptera
- Family: Gracillariidae
- Genus: Phyllonorycter
- Species: P. ganodes

Binomial name
- Phyllonorycter ganodes (Meyrick, 1918)

Species of moth

Phyllonorycter ganodes is a moth of the family Gracillariidae. It is known from India.

The larvae feed on Malus domestica, Malus pumila and Malus sylvestris. They probably mine the leaves of their host plant.
