= Phrixosceles trochosticha =

Scientific classification
- Kingdom: Animalia
- Phylum: Arthropoda
- Class: Insecta
- Order: Lepidoptera
- Family: Gracillariidae
- Genus: Phrixosceles
- Species: P. trochosticha

Binomial name
- Phrixosceles trochosticha Meyrick, 1908

Species of moth

Phrixosceles trochosticha is a moth of the family Gracillariidae. It is known from Meghalaya, India.
