= Phyllonorycter iteina =

Scientific classification
- Kingdom: Animalia
- Phylum: Arthropoda
- Class: Insecta
- Order: Lepidoptera
- Family: Gracillariidae
- Genus: Phyllonorycter
- Species: P. iteina

Binomial name
- Phyllonorycter iteina (Meyrick, 1918)

Synonyms
- Lithocolletis iteina Meyrick, 1918; Lithocolletis eophanes Meyrick, 1931; Phyllonorycter eophanes

Species of moth

Phyllonorycter pruinosella is a moth of the family Gracillariidae. It is known from Bengal and Bombay in what is now India and Bangladesh.

The larvae feed on Salix species, including Salix tetrasperma. They probably mine the leaves of their host plant.
