= Stomphastis chalybacma =

Scientific classification
- Kingdom: Animalia
- Phylum: Arthropoda
- Class: Insecta
- Order: Lepidoptera
- Family: Gracillariidae
- Genus: Stomphastis
- Species: S. chalybacma

Binomial name
- Stomphastis chalybacma (Meyrick, 1908)

Synonyms
- Epicephala chalybacma Meyrick, 1908

Species of moth

Stomphastis chalybacma is a moth of the family Gracillariidae. It is known from India, Indonesia (Sulawesi), Malaysia (West Malaysia and Sabah), Myanmar, Sri Lanka and Thailand.

The larvae feed on Caesalpinia decapetala, Caesalpinia pulcherrima and Samanea saman. They probably mine the leaves of their host plant.
