= Telamoptilia hemistacta =

Scientific classification
- Kingdom: Animalia
- Phylum: Arthropoda
- Class: Insecta
- Order: Lepidoptera
- Family: Gracillariidae
- Genus: Telamoptilia
- Species: T. hemistacta

Binomial name
- Telamoptilia hemistacta (Meyrick, 1924)

Synonyms
- Acrocercops hemistacta Meyrick, 1924

Species of moth

Telamoptilia hemistacta is a moth of the family Gracillariidae. It is known from India (Bihar), Taiwan, Japan (the Ryukyu Islands) and Madagascar.

The wingspan is about 7 mm.

The larvae feed on Achyranthes species, including Achyranthes aspera, Achyranthes bidentata and Achyranthes japonica. They probably mine the leaves of their host plant.
