= Phyllonorycter zonochares =

Scientific classification
- Kingdom: Animalia
- Phylum: Arthropoda
- Class: Insecta
- Order: Lepidoptera
- Family: Gracillariidae
- Genus: Phyllonorycter
- Species: P. zonochares

Binomial name
- Phyllonorycter zonochares (Meyrick, 1933)

Species of moth

Phyllonorycter zonochares is a moth of the family Gracillariidae. It is known to be found in Jammu and Kashmir, India.
