= Phyllonorycter iochrysis =

Scientific classification
- Kingdom: Animalia
- Phylum: Arthropoda
- Class: Insecta
- Order: Lepidoptera
- Family: Gracillariidae
- Genus: Phyllonorycter
- Species: P. iochrysis

Binomial name
- Phyllonorycter iochrysis (Meyrick, 1931)

Species of moth

Phyllonorycter iochrysis is a moth of the family Gracillariidae. It is known from Bihar, India.

The larvae feed on Ziziphus jujuba and Ziziphus mauritiana. They probably mine the leaves of their host plant.
