= Phyllonorycter drepanota =

Scientific classification
- Kingdom: Animalia
- Phylum: Arthropoda
- Class: Insecta
- Order: Lepidoptera
- Family: Gracillariidae
- Genus: Phyllonorycter
- Species: P. drepanota

Binomial name
- Phyllonorycter drepanota Kumata, 1973

Species of moth

Phyllonorycter drepanota is a moth of the family Gracillariidae. It is known from the Nepal and Uttarakhand, India.

The wingspan is 5.5–7 mm.

The larvae feed on Engelhardia spicata. They mine the leaves of their host plant.
