= Caloptilia scaeodesma =

Scientific classification
- Kingdom: Animalia
- Phylum: Arthropoda
- Class: Insecta
- Order: Lepidoptera
- Family: Gracillariidae
- Genus: Caloptilia
- Species: C. scaeodesma

Binomial name
- Caloptilia scaeodesma (Meyrick, 1928)

Species of moth

Caloptilia scaeodesma, also known as the Kacang Putih Moth, is a moth of the family Gracillariidae. It is known from India (including the Andaman Islands) Indonesia (the Anambas Islands), Malaysia (Selangor), Sri Lanka and Vanuatu. The name is for their larvae's tendency to roll the ends of leaves onto itself, making it resemble rolled up Bombay Mix, which is called kacang putih in Malaysia and Singapore.

The larvae feed on Rhizophora and Sonneratia species. They mine the leaves of their host plant. They have a wingspan of 10 mm.
