= Phyllonorycter hapalotoxa =

Scientific classification
- Kingdom: Animalia
- Phylum: Arthropoda
- Class: Insecta
- Order: Lepidoptera
- Family: Gracillariidae
- Genus: Phyllonorycter
- Species: P. hapalotoxa

Binomial name
- Phyllonorycter hapalotoxa (Meyrick, 1921)

Species of moth

Phyllonorycter hapalotoxa is a moth of the family Gracillariidae. It is found in Assam and Meghalaya, India.

The larvae feed on Malus domestica, Malus pumila and Malus sylvestris. They probably mine the leaves of their host plant.
