= Acrocercops hyphantica =

Scientific classification
- Kingdom: Animalia
- Phylum: Arthropoda
- Class: Insecta
- Order: Lepidoptera
- Family: Gracillariidae
- Genus: Acrocercops
- Species: A. hyphantica

Binomial name
- Acrocercops hyphantica Meyrick, 1912

Species of moth

Acrocercops hyphantica is a moth of the family Gracillariidae, known from Bihar, India. It was described by Edward Meyrick in 1912. The hostplants for the species include Caesalpinia bonduc and Caesalpinia decapetala.
