= Acrocercops scandalota =

Scientific classification
- Kingdom: Animalia
- Phylum: Arthropoda
- Class: Insecta
- Order: Lepidoptera
- Family: Gracillariidae
- Genus: Acrocercops
- Species: A. scandalota

Binomial name
- Acrocercops scandalota Meyrick, 1914

Species of moth

Acrocercops scandalota is a moth of the family Gracillariidae. It is known from India (Karnataka).

The larvae feed on Mallotus philippinensis and Helicteres isora. They probably mine the leaves of their host plant. The mine has the form of a blotch beneath the upper cuticle of the leaves. Several larvae are found in one mine.
