= Acrocercops hormista =

Scientific classification
- Domain: Eukaryota
- Kingdom: Animalia
- Phylum: Arthropoda
- Class: Insecta
- Order: Lepidoptera
- Family: Gracillariidae
- Genus: Acrocercops
- Species: A. hormista

Binomial name
- Acrocercops hormista Meyrick, 1916

Species of moth

Acrocercops hormista is a moth of the family Gracillariidae. It is known from India (Karnataka, Bihar) and Madagascar.

This species has a wingspan of 10mm, head and thorax are whitish grey, abdomen grey. Forewings are narrowly allongated, pale greyish, irregularly irrorated with dark fuscous. Hindwings and cilia are grey.

The larvae feed on Psiadia altissima, Psiadia dodonaeifolia, Cedrela toona and Toona ciliata. They probably mine the leaves of their host plant.
