= Phyllonorycter triplex =

Scientific classification
- Kingdom: Animalia
- Phylum: Arthropoda
- Class: Insecta
- Order: Lepidoptera
- Family: Gracillariidae
- Genus: Phyllonorycter
- Species: P. triplex

Binomial name
- Phyllonorycter triplex (Meyrick, 1914)

Species of moth

Phyllonorycter triplex is a moth of the family Gracillariidae. It is known from Tamil Nadu, India.

Its subfamily are the Lithocolletinae.
