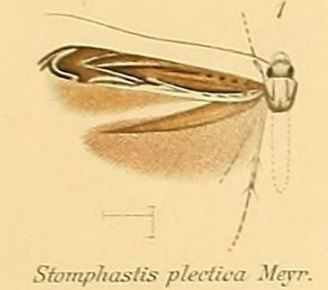

Scientific classification
- Kingdom: Animalia
- Phylum: Arthropoda
- Clade: Pancrustacea
- Class: Insecta
- Order: Lepidoptera
- Family: Gracillariidae
- Genus: Stomphastis
- Species: S. thraustica

Binomial name
- Stomphastis thraustica (Meyrick, 1908)

Synonyms
- Acrocercops thraustica Meyrick, 1908; Stomphastis plectica Meyrick, 1912; Stomphastis thaustica Bland, 1980

= Stomphastis thraustica =

Species of moth

Stomphastis thraustica is a moth of the family Gracillariidae that was described by Edward Meyrick in 1908. It is known from Democratic Republic of Congo, Congo, Central African Republic, Ghana, Nigeria, Namibia, Zimbabwe, South Africa, Madagascar, Malaysia, Indonesia (Sulawesi, Java) and India (West Bengal, Karnataka). It was recently also recorded in China, where there are over ten overlapping generations per year.

The larvae feed on Jatropha species (including Jatropha curcas and Jatropha gossypifolia) and Sebastiana chamaelea. They mine the leaves of their host plant. Stomphastis thraustica has been released in Australia as a biologial control for bellyache bush (Jatropha gossypifolia).
