= Phyllonorycter triarcha =

Scientific classification
- Kingdom: Animalia
- Phylum: Arthropoda
- Clade: Pancrustacea
- Class: Insecta
- Order: Lepidoptera
- Family: Gracillariidae
- Genus: Phyllonorycter
- Species: P. triarcha

Binomial name
- Phyllonorycter triarcha (Meyrick, 1908)

Synonyms
- Lithocolletis triarcha Meyrick, 1908

Species of moth

Phyllonorycter triarcha is a moth of the family Gracillariidae. It is known from India (Bihar), Indonesia (Moluccas), Malaysia (West Malaysia), the Philippines (Luzon, Negros) and Thailand. This species is a well-known pest of cotton.

The larvae feed on Gossypium species, including Gossypium barbadense and Gossypium herbaceum. They mine the leaves of their host plant.
