= Phyllonorycter acratynta =

Scientific classification
- Kingdom: Animalia
- Phylum: Arthropoda
- Class: Insecta
- Order: Lepidoptera
- Family: Gracillariidae
- Genus: Phyllonorycter
- Species: P. acratynta

Binomial name
- Phyllonorycter acratynta (Meyrick, 1916)

Species of moth

Phyllonorycter acratynta is a moth of the family Gracillariidae. It is known from Indian state of Tamil Nadu.
