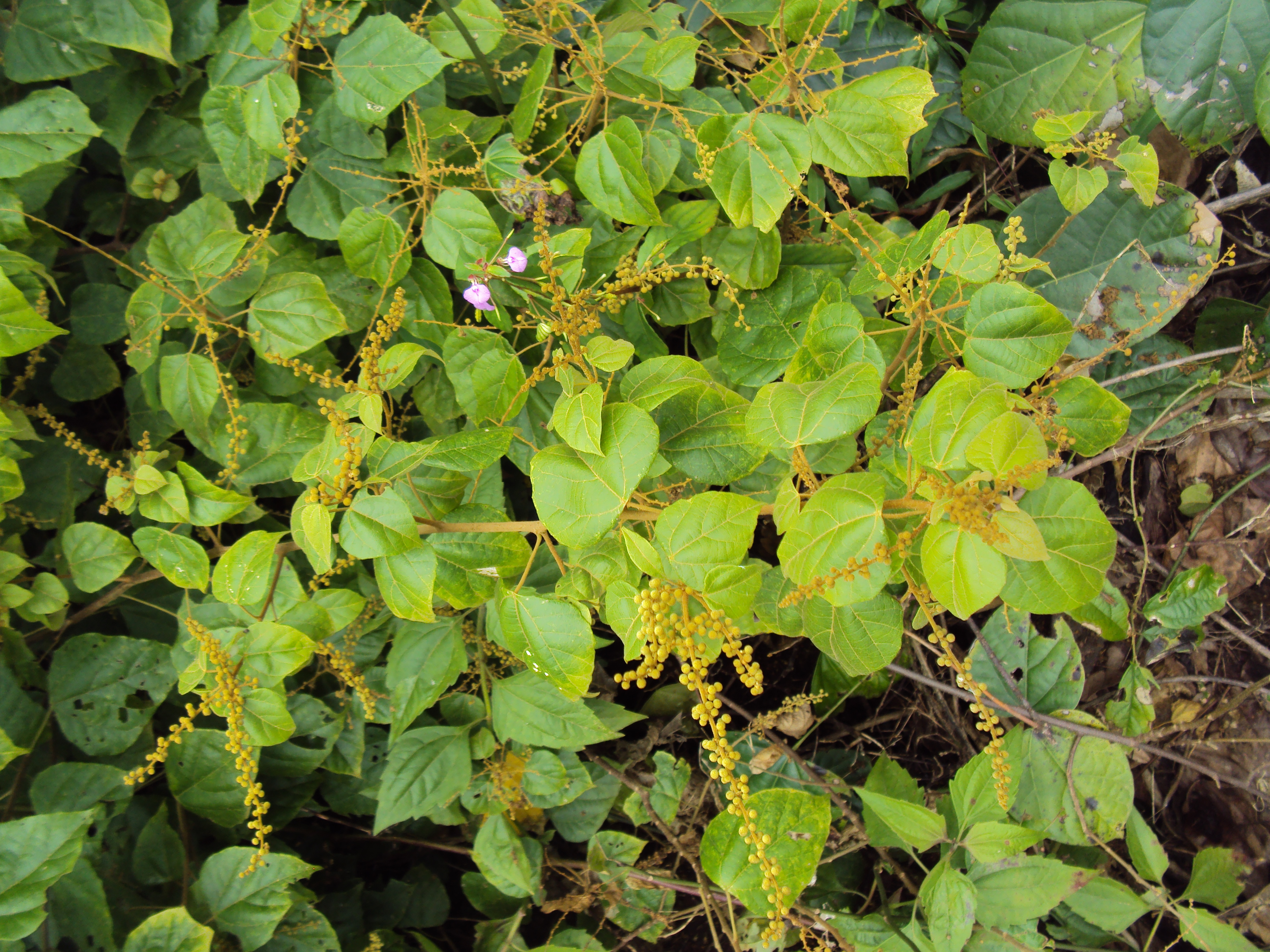

Conservation status
- Least Concern (IUCN 3.1)

Scientific classification
- Kingdom: Plantae
- Clade: Embryophytes
- Clade: Tracheophytes
- Clade: Spermatophytes
- Clade: Angiosperms
- Clade: Eudicots
- Clade: Rosids
- Order: Malpighiales
- Family: Euphorbiaceae
- Genus: Mallotus
- Species: M. repandus

Binomial name
- Mallotus repandus (Rottler) Müll.Arg.

Synonyms
- 26 synonyms: Croton repandus Rottler (1803); Rottlera repanda (Rottler) Scheff. (1869); Adisca timoriana Span. (1841); Croton baccifer Benth. (1847), nom. nud.; Croton rhombifolius Willd. (1805); Croton volubilis Llanos (1856); Mallotus chrysocarpus Pamp. (1910); Mallotus contubernalis Hance (1882); Mallotus contubernalis var. chrysocarpus (Pamp.) Hand.-Mazz. (1931); Mallotus repandus var. chrysocarpus (Pamp.) S.M.Hwang (1985); Mallotus repandus var. megaphyllus Croizat (1938); Mallotus repandus var. scabrifolius (A.Juss.) Müll.Arg. (1866); Mallotus scabrifolius (A.Juss.) Müll.Arg. (1866); Mallotus scandens (Span.) Müll.Arg. (1866); Mappa scandens (Span.) Pancher ex Baill. (1862); Rottlera cordifolia Benth. (1861); Rottlera dicocca Roxb. (1832); Rottlera dioica Baill. (1858); Rottlera laccifera Voigt (1845); Rottlera rhombifolia (Willd.) Thwaites (1861); Rottlera scabrifolia A.Juss. (1824); Rottlera scandens Span. (1841); Rottlera trinervis Zipp. ex Span. (1841); Rottlera viscida Blume (1826); Trevia nudiflora var. dentata Susila & N.P.Balakr. (1998); Helwingia populifolia Spreng. (1815)

= Mallotus repandus =

Species of plant in the spurge family

Mallotus repandus, known in Australia as the climbing mallotus, is a species of plant in the spurge family Euphorbiaceae. It is native to the Indian subcontinent, mainland Southeast Asia, Malesia, New Guinea, Queensland, New Caledonia and Vanuatu.

== Description ==
Mallotus repandus is an evergreen vine that may reach up to 20 m (66 ft) long and a stem diameter of up to 22 cm (8.7 in). It is the only Mallotus species to grow as a liana. Bark is dark brownish grey. Branchlets, petioles and inflorescences are dull yellowish-brown. The blaze (longitudinal cut of the bark) is finely layered, with an odour of green peas (Pisum sativum). The simple and broad leaves are slightly peltate. Flowers are yellowish. It flowers in China from March to May, and fruits from June to September. The species can be distinguished from other Mallotus species, by its being a climber and that its upper leaf surface have more than 2 marginal extrafloral nectaries, and that its fruits are (1-or) 2- or 3-locular. A molecular phylogeny study has M. repandus as a sister species of M. phillippensis (Lam.) Muell.Arg. The indumentum/hairs on the leaves of the plant are simple and multicellular, a trait only found amongst the Mallotus genera in the closely related M. philippensis.

== Habitat ==
The climber/shrub grows locally scattered in the understorey of primary to secondary forest, and in disturbed sites and scrub. It can be found at forest edges, mangrove swamp edges, road and river sides, ridges, steep slopes and dry ground. It is able to grow on various soil types, including those derived from limestone and granite, on sandy loam and rocky soils. It occurs from sea level to 1,500 m (4,900 ft) altitude. It generally flowers and fruits throughout the year. Grows in both lowland and upland rain forest in Queensland, at elevations from near sea level to 750 m (2,460 ft). In Southeast Asia, the liana/shrub occurs in secondary vegetation formations or on the edges of dense forests. In China it is found in thickets, forest and their fringes, hills and mountain valleys below 100 m (330 ft). The plant is sometimes harmed by infestation with the parasite plant Cuscuta japonica (Japanese dodder). It provides food for the moth Acrocercops zopherandra. It is one of three Mallotus species that host the fungus Cercospora malloti.

== Distribution ==
The climbing mallotus is native to a very broad area from India to Oceania, including India, East Himalaya, Nepal, Bangladesh, Sri Lanka, Andaman and Nicobar Islands, much of east, central and southern China, Taiwan, Myanmar, Laos, Vietnam, Thailand, Cambodia, Malaysia, Indonesia, Philippines, New Guinea, Queensland, New Caledonia, and Vanuatu.

== Common names ==
Vernacular names for M. repandus include:

- climbing mallotus (Australia);
- waithied (Lifou);
- wananugapok (Waskuk);
- toho (Wagu);
- ngontoen (New Guinea);
- nono nuifmetan (Dawan);
- bina (Rote);
- keterakaba, ikur wase, rowe (Lesser Sunda Islands);
- katjoe-kilang, merangan, sindukan, toekal takal (Java);
- panuálan (Tagalog);
- adgao, ambao, tagbanua, tapin (Philippines);
- 石岩枫, shi yan feng (Chinese);
- ma-pawp-kua (Lao);
- chumpu préi, champou prei, mtehs barang (Khmer);
- makai krapap, krapok krapoi, kurapia, makai khruea, makai kûae, mapop khruea, naeo nam, pho khan, yiao maeo, yiao maeo thao (Thai);
- ku-ko-mu-ya (Malay);
- ngahlaing-bo, taw-thidin-nww (Myanmar);
- akoos (Hindi); kanda-veltoo (Teling, India); watta-tali (India).

== Uses ==
On the island of Rote, eastern Indonesia, the wood of this plant, bina, is one of two used to make the bars for meko ai (xylophone whose bars are made of wood), it is also recorded in an origin myth for this musical instrument. In Cambodia, the wood is used to make charcoal for powder. In Kut Chum District, central northeast Thailand, it is used in folk-medicine as an antibiotic, while Northeastern Thai people use it to relieve bone-pain, while elsewhere in Thailand the bark is used in ethnomedicine to treat herpes simplex, inflammation and liver poisoning.
