= Melanocercops phractopa =

Scientific classification
- Kingdom: Animalia
- Phylum: Arthropoda
- Class: Insecta
- Order: Lepidoptera
- Family: Gracillariidae
- Genus: Melanocercops
- Species: M. phractopa

Binomial name
- Melanocercops phractopa (Meyrick, 1918)

Synonyms
- Acrocercops phractopa Meyrick, 1918

Species of moth

Melanocercops phractopa is a moth of the family Gracillariidae. It is known from India (Bihar) and Japan (the Ryukyu Islands).

The wingspan is 5.2-6.8 mm.

The larvae feed on Ficus benghalensis, Ficus indica, Ficus infectoria and Ficus microcarpa. They probably mine the leaves of their host plant.
