= Acrocercops tenera =

Scientific classification
- Kingdom: Animalia
- Phylum: Arthropoda
- Class: Insecta
- Order: Lepidoptera
- Family: Gracillariidae
- Genus: Acrocercops
- Species: A. tenera

Binomial name
- Acrocercops tenera Meyrick, 1914

Species of moth

Acrocercops tenera is a moth of the family Gracillariidae. It is known from India (Bihar), Indonesia (Java) and Sri Lanka.

The larvae feed on Schleicheria oleosa and Schleicheria trijuga. They probably mine the leaves of their host plant.
