= Phyllonorycter eratantha =

Scientific classification
- Kingdom: Animalia
- Phylum: Arthropoda
- Class: Insecta
- Order: Lepidoptera
- Family: Gracillariidae
- Genus: Phyllonorycter
- Species: P. eratantha

Binomial name
- Phyllonorycter eratantha (Meyrick, 1922)

Species of moth

Phyllonorycter eratantha is a moth of the family Gracillariidae. It is known from the Punjab region of what was then India.
