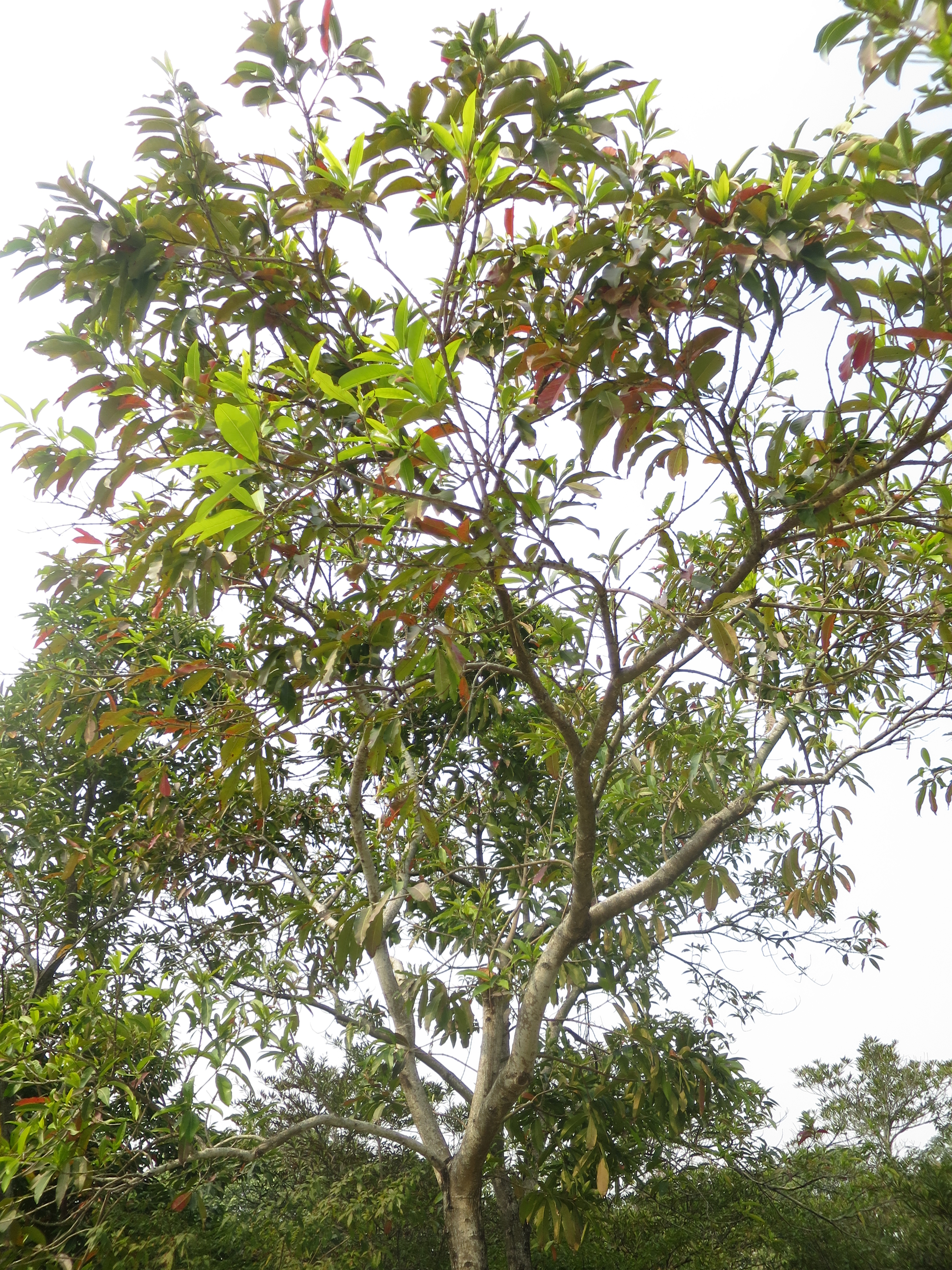
- In Hong Kong

Conservation status
- Least Concern (IUCN 3.1)

Scientific classification
- Kingdom: Plantae
- Clade: Tracheophytes
- Clade: Angiosperms
- Clade: Eudicots
- Clade: Rosids
- Order: Myrtales
- Family: Myrtaceae
- Genus: Syzygium
- Species: S. nervosum

Binomial name
- Syzygium nervosum DC.

Synonyms
- 35 synonyms: Cleistocalyx nervosus (A.Cunn. ex DC.) Kosterm.; Eugenia nervosa (A.Cunn. ex DC.) Bedd.; Calyptranthes costata Buch.-Ham. ex Wall.; Calyptranthes cuneata Buch.-Ham. ex Wall.; Calyptranthes grandis Buch.-Ham. ex Wall.; Calyptranthes makul Blanco; Calyptranthes mangiferifolia Hance ex Walp.; Calyptranthes tatna Buch.-Ham. ex Wall.; Calyptranthes zuzygium Blanco; Cleistocalyx cerasoides (Roxb.) I.M.Turner; Cleistocalyx cerasoides var. paniala (Roxb.) I.M.Turner; Cleistocalyx nervosus var. paniala (Roxb.) J.Parn. & Chantaranothai; Cleistocalyx operculatus (Roxb.) Merr. & L.M.Perry; Cleistocalyx operculatus var. paniala (Roxb.) Chantar. & J.Parn.; Eugenia cerasoides Roxb.; Eugenia clausa C.B.Rob.; Eugenia divaricatocymosa Hayata; Eugenia gigantea Ridl.; Eugenia holtzeana F.Muell.; Eugenia holtzei F.Muell.; Eugenia operculata Roxb.; Eugenia operculata var. cerasoides (Roxb.) Craib; Eugenia operculata var. obovata Kurz; Eugenia operculata var. paniala (Roxb.) King; Eugenia paniala Roxb.; Eugenia suavis Ridl.; Syzygium cerasoides (Roxb.) Chatterjee & Kanjilal; Syzygium cerasoides Raizada; Syzygium nervosum var. obovatum (Kurz) A.Kumar; Syzygium nervosum var. paniala (Roxb.) Craven & Biffin; Syzygium nodosum Miq.; Syzygium operculatum (Roxb.) Nied.; Syzygium operculatum var. obovatum (Kurz) Gamble; Syzygium polyanthum Thwaites; Syzygium suave (Ridl.) Widodo; Syzygium wallichianum C.Presl

= Syzygium nervosum =

Species of tree

Syzygium nervosum is a species of tree native to tropical Asia and Australia, extending as far north as Guangdong and Guangxi in China and as far south as the Northern Territory of Australia. It was previously known as Cleistocalyx operculatus, C. nervosum, and Eugenia operculata, and it has many other synonyms. It is a medium-sized tree of about 10 meters in height with pale brown bark and dull green leaves.

== Description ==
The leaves of S. nervosum are elliptical, obovate and glabrous, measuring 7–9 cm in length. Flowers cluster as greenish white trichomatous panicles. The blossoms have 4 petals. The 7–12 mm diameter fruits are ovoid with a concave tip and a wrinkled texture. The fruits turn purplish upon ripening.

== Uses ==
In Vietnam the leaves and buds of S. nervosum are harvested, dried, and brewed as an herbal tea known as "nước vối" with stomachic properties.

== Gallery ==
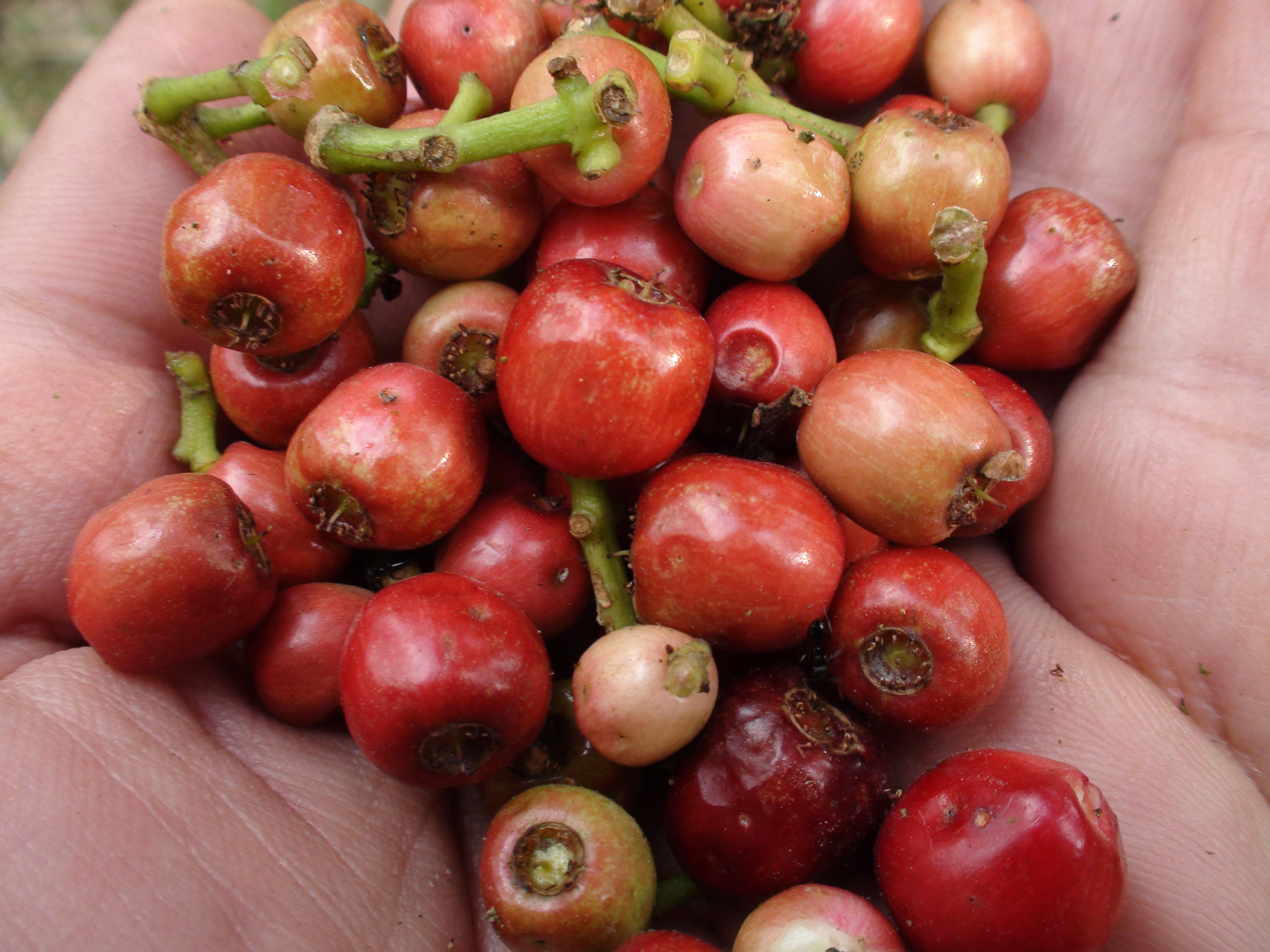
Ripe fruit in Nepal

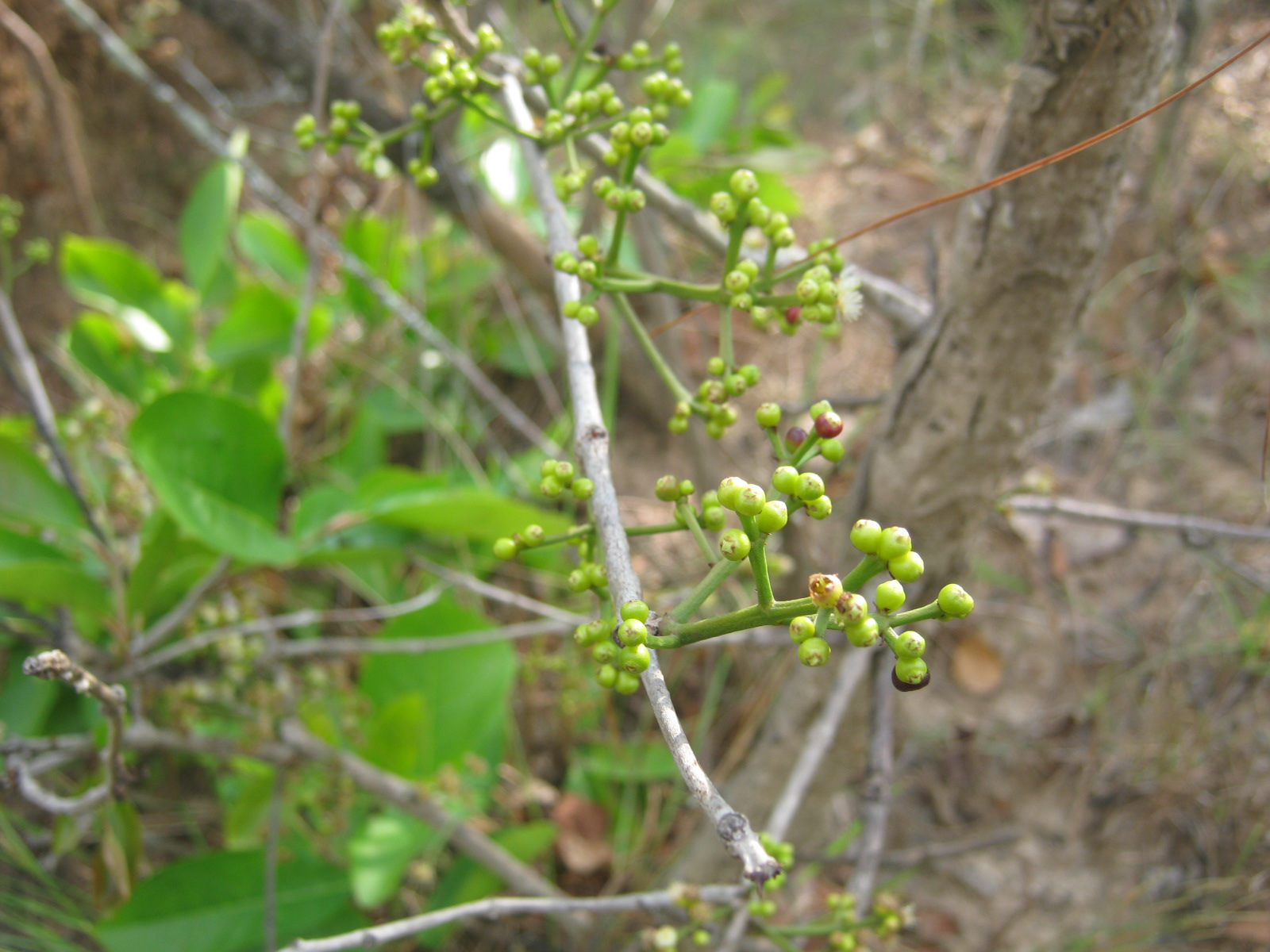
Fruit in Panchkhal Valley, Nepal

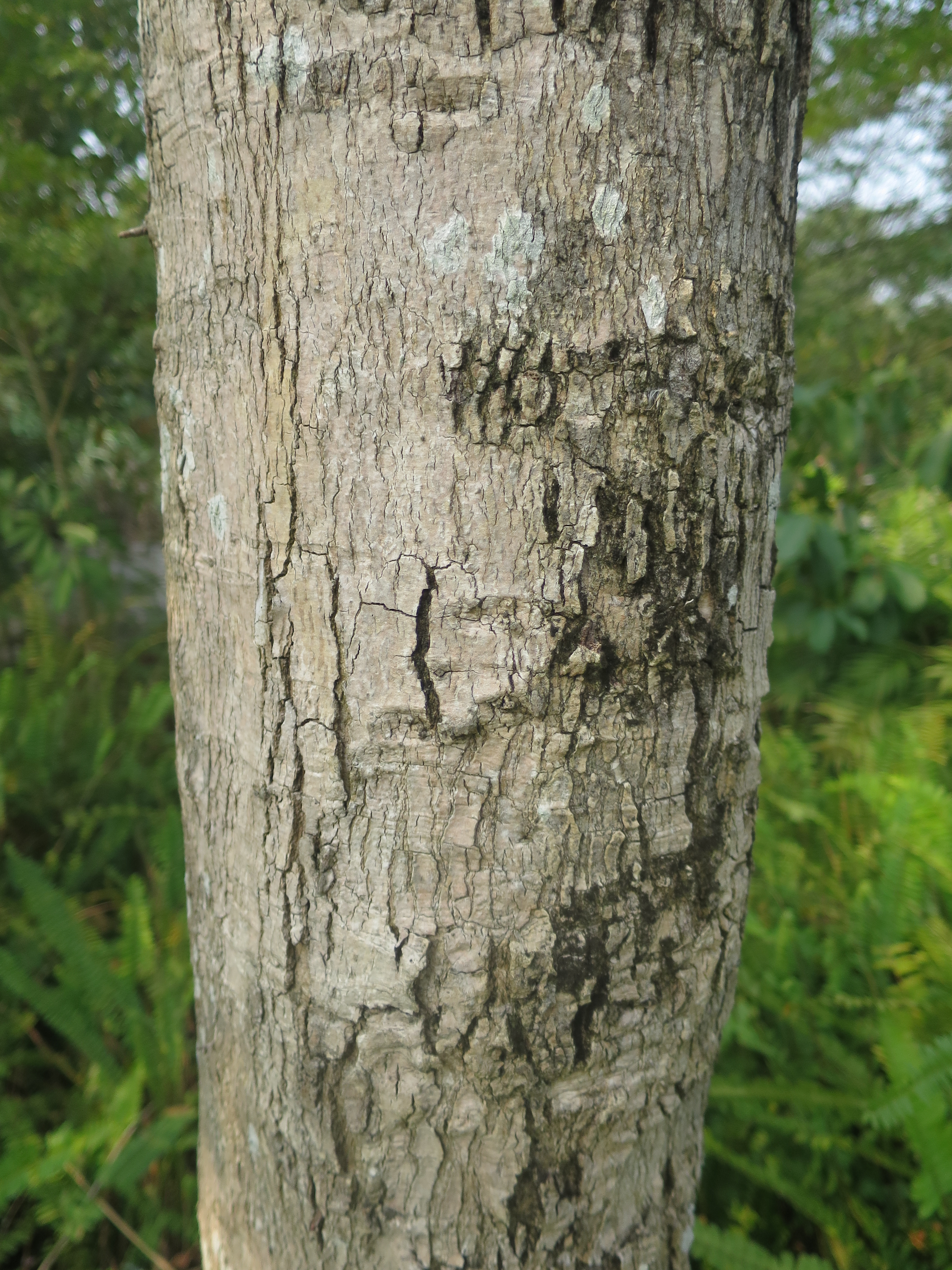
Bark close-up

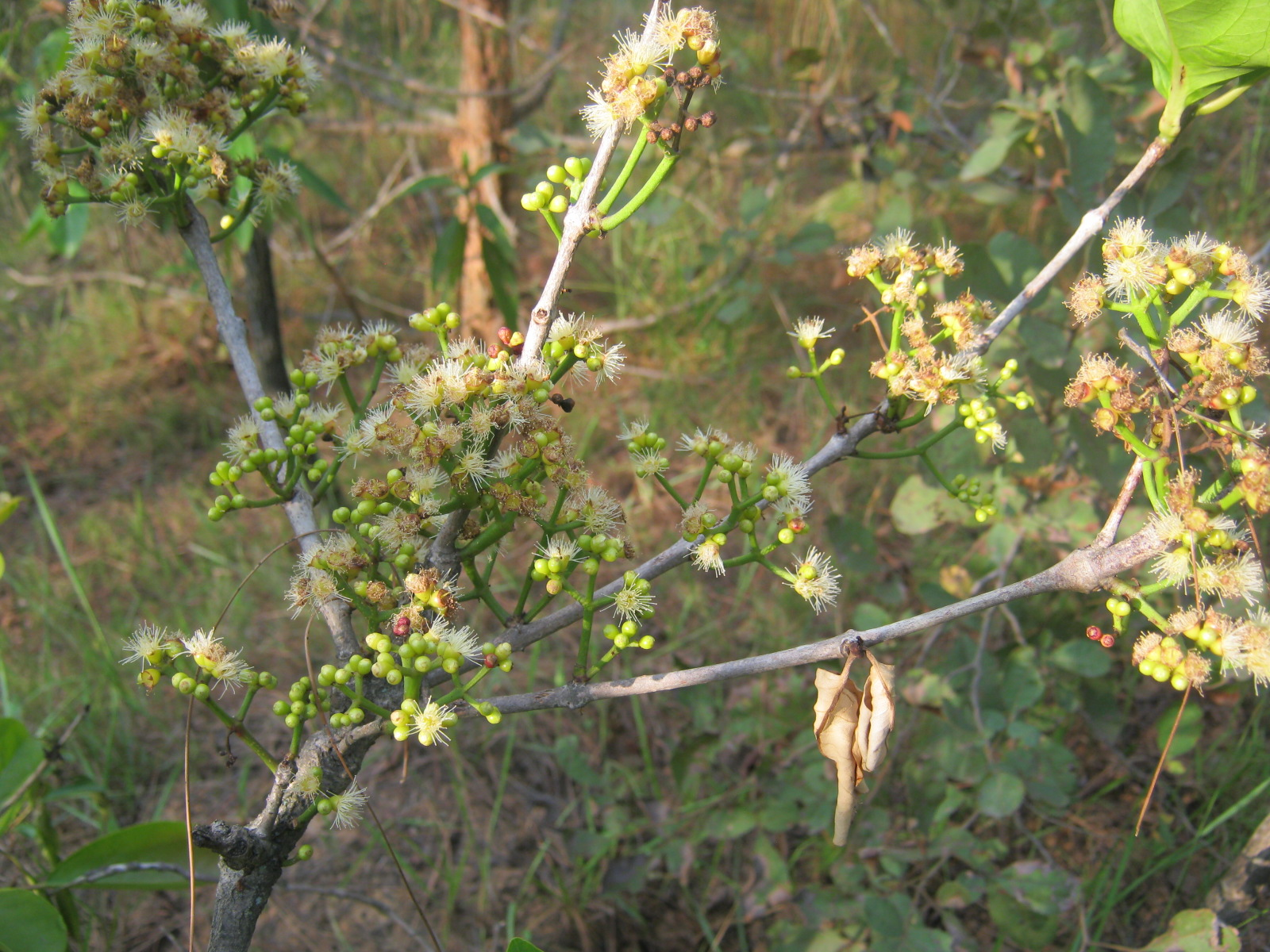
Flower in May
