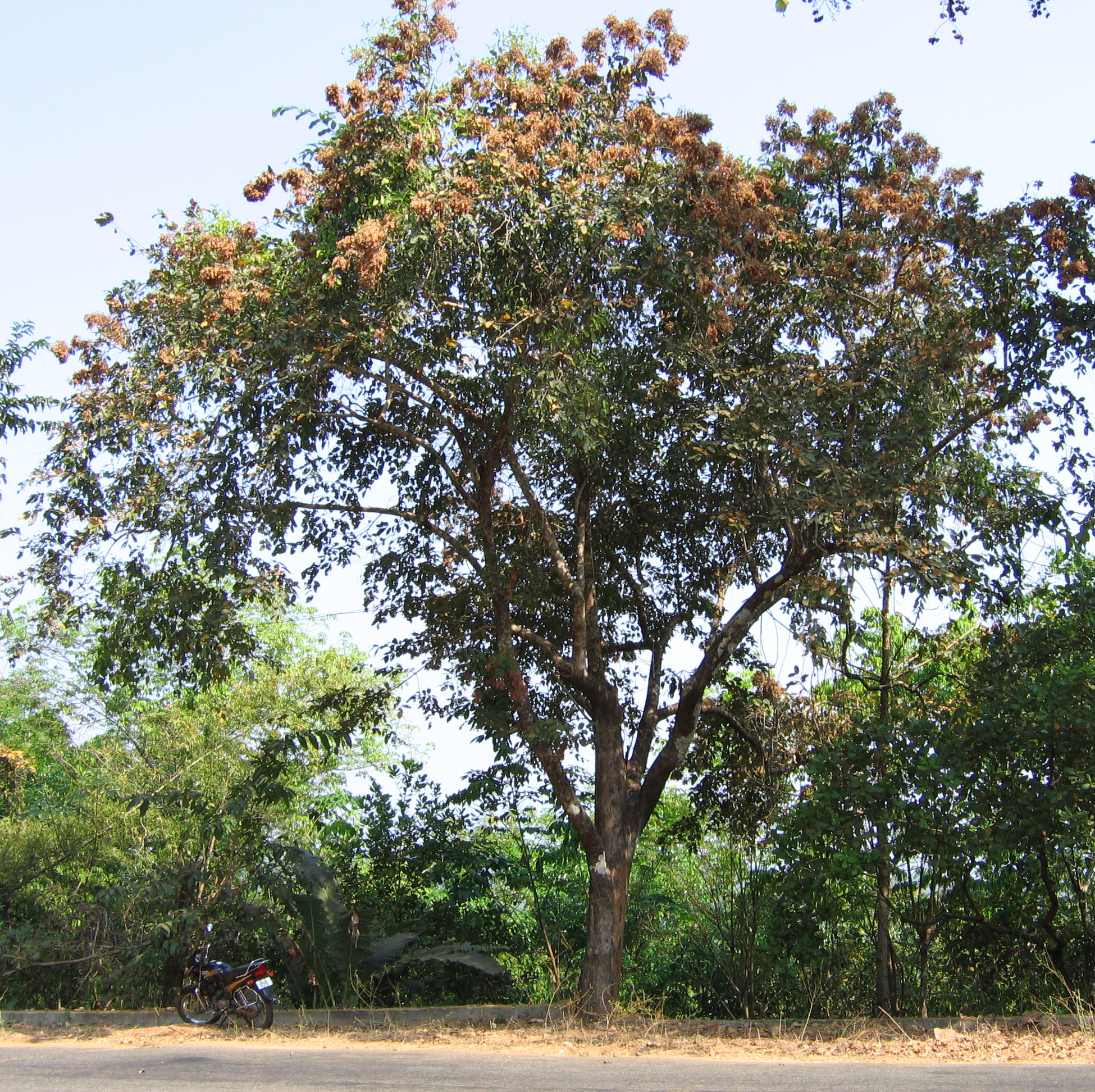

Scientific classification
- Kingdom: Plantae
- Clade: Tracheophytes
- Clade: Angiosperms
- Clade: Eudicots
- Clade: Rosids
- Order: Myrtales
- Family: Combretaceae
- Genus: Terminalia
- Species: T. paniculata

Binomial name
- Terminalia paniculata Roth

= Terminalia paniculata =

Species of tree native to southwest India

Terminalia paniculata is a large-sized commercial timber tree endemic to Peninsular India, commonly distributed in Karnataka and Kerala.

Terminalias are especially known for cyclic triterpenes, flavanoids and tannins and T. paniculata is the best source of tannins. The tree is commonly known as Kindal in terms of timber and Flowering Murdah in terms of ornamental purposes, locally known as Kindal (Hindi), Hanalu (Kannada), Kindal (Konkani), Vellamaruth (Malayalam), Pillai Maruth (Tamil), Pulimaddi (Telugu), Asvakarna (Sanskrit), Kinjal (Marathi), etc. Golden coloured flowers and deep red coloured fruits of T. paniculata give splendid colouration to the entire forest area due to the formation of a large number of flowers and fruits in a single individual and population dominance. Species were recently neotypified by the Botanical Survey of India.

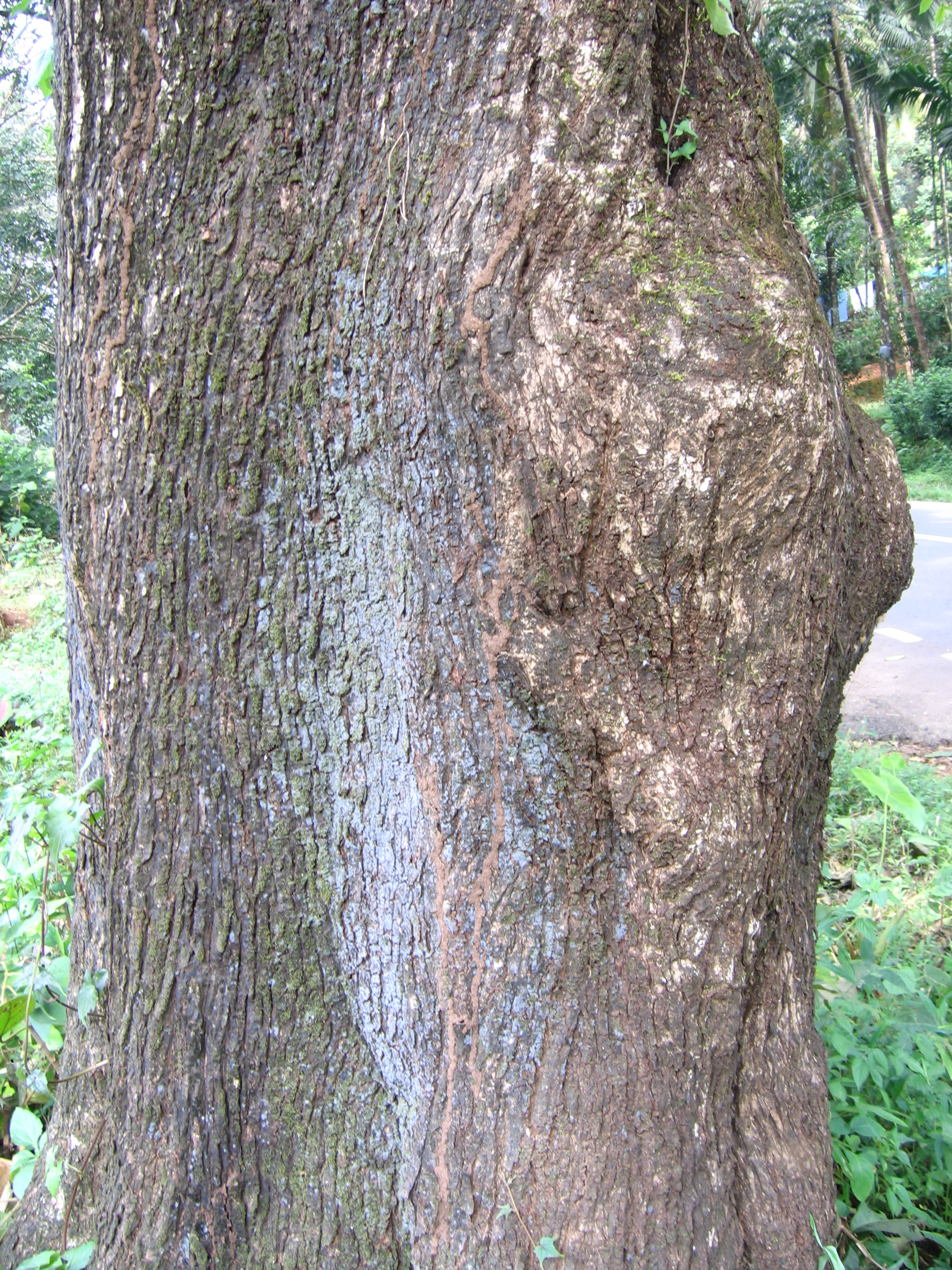
Bark of Terminalia paniculata

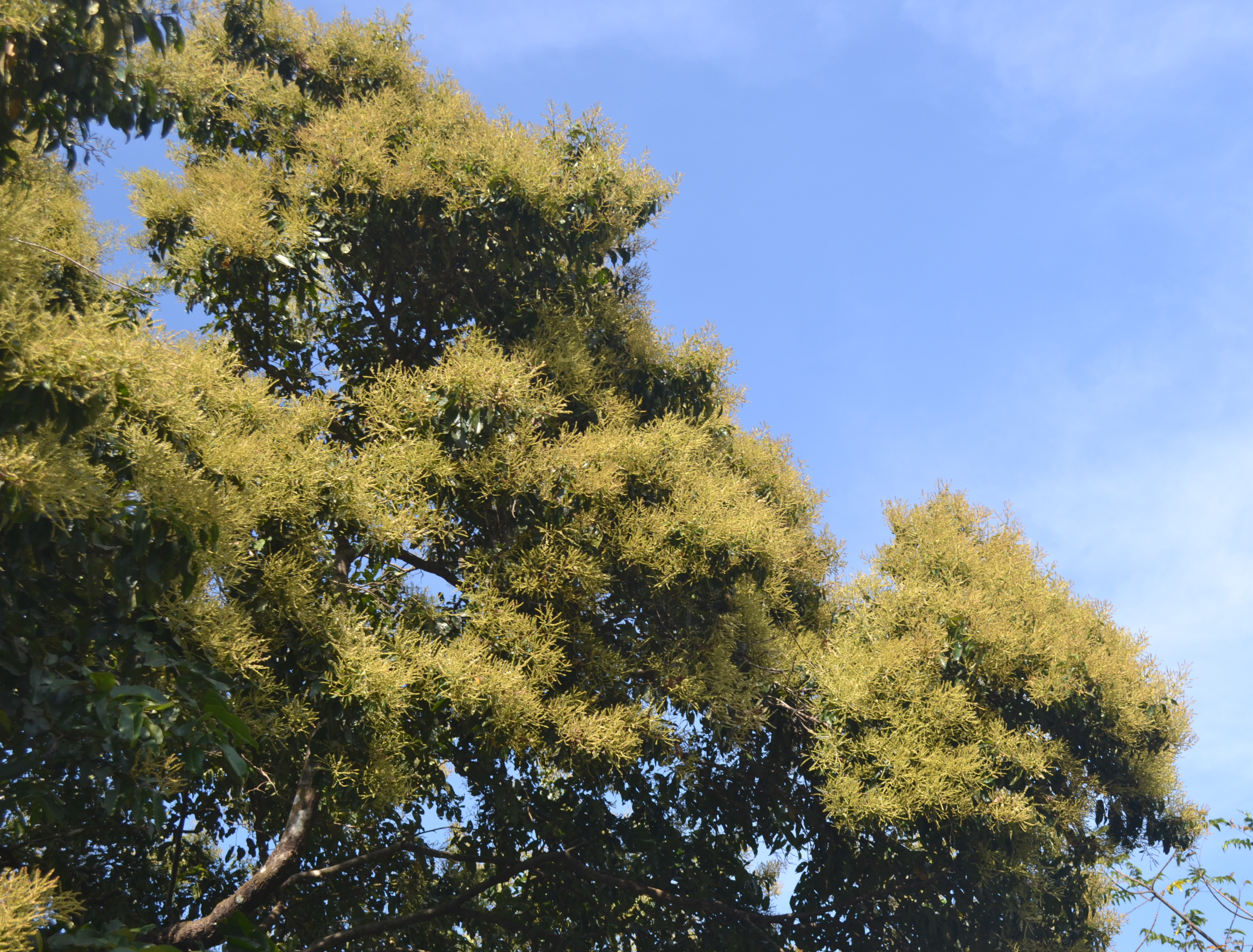
Flowers
