= Telamoptilia cathedraea =

Scientific classification
- Kingdom: Animalia
- Phylum: Arthropoda
- Class: Insecta
- Order: Lepidoptera
- Family: Gracillariidae
- Genus: Telamoptilia
- Species: T. cathedraea

Binomial name
- Telamoptilia cathedraea (Meyrick, 1908)

Synonyms
- Acrocercops cathedraea Meyrick, 1908

Species of moth

Telamoptilia cathedraea is a moth of the family Gracillariidae. It is known from India (Meghalaya, Bihar), Taiwan, Japan (Kyūshū, the Ryukyu Islands) and Madagascar.

The wingspan is 7–8 mm.

The larvae feed on Urena lobata and Urena tomentosa. They probably mine the leaves of their host plant.
