= List of moths of Australia (Gracillariidae) =

Partial list of Australian moths

This is a list of the Australian moth species of the family Gracillariidae. It also acts as an index to the species articles and forms part of the full List of moths of Australia.

== Gracillarinae ==
- Acrocercops aeglophanes Turner, 1913
- Acrocercops aeolellum (Meyrick, 1880)
- Acrocercops albida Turner, 1947
- Acrocercops albomaculella (Turner, 1894)
- Acrocercops alysidota (Meyrick, 1880)
- Acrocercops antigrapha Turner, 1926
- Acrocercops antimima Turner, 1940
- Acrocercops apoblepta Turner, 1913
- Acrocercops archepolis (Meyrick, 1907)
- Acrocercops argyrodesma (Meyrick, 1882)
- Acrocercops argyrosema Turner, 1947
- Acrocercops autadelpha (Meyrick, 1880)
- Acrocercops axinophora Turner, 1940
- Acrocercops caenotheta (Meyrick, 1880)
- Acrocercops calicella (Stainton, 1862)
- Acrocercops candida Turner, 1947
- Acrocercops chalcea Turner, 1926
- Acrocercops chalceopla (Turner, 1913)
- Acrocercops chionoplecta (Meyrick, 1882)
- Acrocercops chionosema Turner, 1940
- Acrocercops clinozona Meyrick, 1920
- Acrocercops clisiophora Turner, 1940
- Acrocercops crucigera Meyrick, 1920
- Acrocercops didymella (Meyrick, 1880)
- Acrocercops doloploca Meyrick, 1921
- Acrocercops enchlamyda (Turner, 1894)
- Acrocercops ennychodes Meyrick, 1921
- Acrocercops eupetala (Meyrick, 1880)
- Acrocercops euryschema Turner, 1947
- Acrocercops grammatacma Meyrick, 1921
- Acrocercops hedymopa Turner, 1913
- Acrocercops hierocosma Meyrick, 1912
- Acrocercops hoplocala (Meyrick, 1880)
- Acrocercops irrorata (Turner, 1894)
- Acrocercops isotoma Turner, 1940
- Acrocercops laciniella (Meyrick, 1880)
- Acrocercops leptalea (Turner, 1900)
- Acrocercops leucomochla Turner, 1926
- Acrocercops leucotoma Turner, 1913
- Acrocercops lithogramma Meyrick, 1920
- Acrocercops macaria Turner, 1913
- Acrocercops mendosa Meyrick, 1912
- Acrocercops mesochaeta Meyrick, 1920
- Acrocercops nereis (Meyrick, 1880)
- Acrocercops obscurella (Turner, 1894)
- Acrocercops ochrocephala (Meyrick, 1880)
- Acrocercops ochroptila Turner, 1913
- Acrocercops ophiodes (Turner, 1896)
- Acrocercops osteopa Meyrick, 1920
- Acrocercops parallela (Turner, 1894)
- Acrocercops penographa Meyrick, 1920
- Acrocercops pertenuis Turner, 1923
- Acrocercops plebeia (Turner, 1894)
- Acrocercops plectospila Meyrick, 1921
- Acrocercops poliocephala Turner, 1913
- Acrocercops prospera Meyrick, 1920
- Acrocercops pyrigenes (Turner, 1896)
- Acrocercops retrogressa Meyrick, 1921
- Acrocercops spodophylla Turner, 1913
- Acrocercops stereomita Turner, 1913
- Acrocercops symploca Turner, 1913
- Acrocercops tetrachorda Turner, 1913
- Acrocercops trapezoides (Turner, 1894)
- Acrocercops tricalyx Meyrick, 1921
- Acrocercops tricuneatella (Meyrick, 1880)
- Acrocercops trisigillata Meyrick, 1921
- Acrocercops tristaniae (Turner, 1894)
- Acrocercops unilineata Turner, 1894
- Aristaea acares (Turner, 1939)
- Aristaea amalopa (Meyrick, 1907)
- Aristaea machaerophora (Turner, 1940)
- Aristaea periphanes Meyrick, 1907
- Aristaea thalassias (Meyrick, 1880)
- Aspilapteryx tessellata (Turner, 1940)
- Caloptilia adelosema (Turner, 1940)
- Caloptilia albospersa (Turner, 1894)
- Caloptilia auchetidella (Meyrick, 1880)
- Caloptilia aurora (Turner, 1894)
- Caloptilia azaleella (Brants, 1913)
- Caloptilia bryonoma (Turner, 1914)
- Caloptilia chalcoptera (Meyrick, 1880)
- Caloptilia chlorella (Turner, 1894)
- Caloptilia cirrhopis (Meyrick, 1907)
- Caloptilia crasiphila (Meyrick, 1912)
- Caloptilia crocostola (Turner, 1917)
- Caloptilia ecphanes (Turner, 1940)
- Caloptilia euglypta (Turner, 1894)
- Caloptilia eurycnema (Turner, 1894)
- Caloptilia eurythiota (Turner, 1913)
- Caloptilia euxesta (Turner, 1913)
- Caloptilia iophanes (Meyrick, 1912)
- Caloptilia ischiastris (Meyrick, 1907)
- Caloptilia leucolitha (Meyrick, 1912)
- Caloptilia liparoxantha (Meyrick, 1920)
- Caloptilia loxocentra (Turner, 1915)
- Caloptilia megalotis (Meyrick, 1908)
- Caloptilia oenopella (Meyrick, 1880)
- Caloptilia ostracodes (Turner, 1917)
- Caloptilia pedina (Turner, 1923)
- Caloptilia peltophanes (Meyrick, 1907)
- Caloptilia perixesta (Turner, 1913)
- Caloptilia plagata (Stainton, 1862)
- Caloptilia plagiotoma (Turner, 1913)
- Caloptilia scutigera (Meyrick, 1921)
- Caloptilia stictocrossa (Turner, 1947)
- Caloptilia thiophylla (Turner, 1913)
- Caloptilia thiosema (Turner, 1913)
- Caloptilia xanthopharella (Meyrick, 1880)
- Caloptilia xylophanes (Turner, 1894)
- Caloptilia xystophanes (Turner, 1913)
- Caloptilia octopunctata (Turner, 1894)
- Caloptilia cyanoxantha (Meyrick, 1920)
- Caloptilia panchrista (Turner, 1913) (formerly a synonym of Caloptilia protiella (Deventer, 1904))
- Calybites lepidella (Meyrick, 1880)
- Conopomorpha antimacha Meyrick, 1907
- Conopomorpha chionochtha Meyrick, 1907
- Conopomorpha cramerella (Snellen, 1904)
- Conopomorpha habrodes Meyrick, 1907
- Conopomorpha heliopla Meyrick, 1907
- Conopomorpha zaplaca Meyrick, 1907
- Cuphodes didymosticha Turner, 1940
- Cuphodes habrophanes Turner, 1940
- Cuphodes holoteles (Turner, 1913)
- Cuphodes lechriotoma (Turner, 1913)
- Cuphodes lithographa (Meyrick, 1912)
- Cuphodes maculosa Turner, 1940
- Cuphodes niphadias (Turner, 1913)
- Cuphodes profluens (Meyrick, 1916)
- Cuphodes thysanota Meyrick, 1897
- Cuphodes zophopasta (Turner, 1913)
- Cyphosticha albomarginata (Stainton, 1862)
- Cyphosticha callimacha (Meyrick, 1920)
- Cyphosticha dialeuca Turner, 1940
- Cyphosticha microta (Turner, 1894)
- Cyphosticha panconita Turner, 1913
- Cyphosticha pandoxa Turner, 1913
- Cyphosticha pyrochroma (Turner, 1894)
- Dialectica aemula (Meyrick, 1916)
- Dialectica scalariella (Zeller, 1850)
- Diphtheroptila ochridorsellum (Meyrick, 1880)
- Epicephala acrobaphes (Turner, 1900)
- Epicephala albistriatella (Turner, 1894)
- Epicephala australis (Turner, 1896)
- Epicephala bathrobaphes Turner, 1947
- Epicephala colymbetella Meyrick, 1880
- Epicephala epimicta (Turner, 1913)
- Epicephala eugonia Turner, 1913
- Epicephala lomatographa Turner, 1913
- Epicephala nephelodes Turner, 1913 (synonym: Epicephala stephanephora Turner, 1923)
- Epicephala spumosa Turner, 1947
- Epicephala trigonophora (Turner, 1900)
- Epicephala zalosticha Turner, 1940
- Epicnistis euryscia Meyrick, 1906
- Gibbovalva quadrifasciata (Stainton, 1863)
- Macarostola ageta (Turner, 1917)
- Macarostola formosa (Stainton, 1862)
- Macarostola ida (Meyrick, 1880)
- Macarostola miltopepla (Turner, 1926)
- Macarostola polyplaca (Lower, 1894)
- Macarostola rosacea (Turner, 1940)
- Melanocercops melanommata (Turner, 1913)
- Metacercops cuphomorpha (Turner, 1940)
- Monocercops actinosema (Turner, 1923)
- Neurostrota gunniella (Busck, 1906)
- Parectopa clethrata Lower, 1923
- Parectopa leucographa Turner, 1940
- Parectopa lyginella (Meyrick, 1880)
- Parectopa mnesicala (Meyrick, 1880)
- Parectopa ophidias (Meyrick, 1907)
- Parectopa toxomacha (Meyrick, 1882)
- Parectopa tyriancha Meyrick, 1920
- Pogonocephala heteropsis (Lower, 1894)
- Polysoma eumetalla (Meyrick, 1880)

== Lithocolletinae ==
- Phyllonorycter conista (Meyrick, 1911) (synonym: Phyllonorycter clarisona (Meyrick, 1916))
- Phyllonorycter enchalcoa (Turner, 1939)
- Phyllonorycter lalagella (Newman, 1856)
- Phyllonorycter messaniella (Zeller, 1846)
- Phyllonorycter stephanota (Meyrick, 1907)
- Porphyrosela aglaozona (Meyrick, 1882)
- Porphyrosela dismochrysa (Lower, 1897)

== Phyllocnistinae ==
- Phyllocnistis acmias Meyrick, 1906
- Phyllocnistis atractias Meyrick, 1906
- Phyllocnistis atranota Meyrick, 1906
- Phyllocnistis citrella Stainton, 1856
- Phyllocnistis diaugella Meyrick, 1880
- Phyllocnistis dichotoma Turner, 1947
- Phyllocnistis diplomochla Turner, 1923
- Phyllocnistis ephimera Turner, 1926
- Phyllocnistis eurymochla Turner, 1923
- Phyllocnistis hapalodes Meyrick, 1906
- Phyllocnistis iodocella Meyrick, 1880
- Phyllocnistis leptomianta Turner, 1923
- Phyllocnistis nymphidia Turner, 1947
- Phyllocnistis psychina Meyrick, 1906
- Phyllocnistis triortha Meyrick, 1906

The following species belong to the subfamily Phyllocnistinae, but have not been assigned to a genus yet. Given here is the original name given to the species when it was first described:

- Eurytyla automacha Meyrick, 1893
- Gracillaria confectella Walker, 1864
- Gracillaria delicatulella Walker, 1864
