= M. formosa =

M. formosa may refer to:

- Macarostola formosa, an Oceanian moth
- Marmosa formosa, a mouse opossum
- Mesodma formosa, an extinct mammal
- Mesosemia formosa, a South African butterfly
- Myrmarachne formosa, a jumping spider
- Myrmecia formosa, an Australian ant
