= Gibbovalva civica =

Scientific classification
- Kingdom: Animalia
- Phylum: Arthropoda
- Class: Insecta
- Order: Lepidoptera
- Family: Gracillariidae
- Genus: Gibbovalva
- Species: G. civica

Binomial name
- Gibbovalva civica (Meyrick, 1914)

Synonyms
- Acrocercops civica Meyrick, 1914; Gibbovalva civina Kuznetzov, 1999

Species of moth

Gibbovalva civica is a moth of the family Gracillariidae. It is known from China (Guangdong), India (Karnataka), Japan (Shikoku, Honshū, Tusima, the Ryukyu Islands and Kyūshū), Malaysia (West Malaysia).

The wingspan is 6.8-8.5 mm.

The larvae feed on Cinnamomum camphora, Cinnamomum daphnoides, Cinnamomum japonicum, Cinnamomum sieboldii, Cinnamomum verum, Cinnamomum zeylanicum, Neolitsea sericea and Persea thunbergii. They probably mine the leaves of their host plant.
