= Macarostola phoenicaula =

Scientific classification
- Kingdom: Animalia
- Phylum: Arthropoda
- Class: Insecta
- Order: Lepidoptera
- Family: Gracillariidae
- Genus: Macarostola
- Species: M. phoenicaula

Binomial name
- Macarostola phoenicaula (Meyrick, 1934)

Species of moth

Macarostola phoenicaula is a moth of the family Gracillariidae. It is known from Fiji.

The larvae feed on Eugenia cumini. They probably mine the leaves of their host plant.
