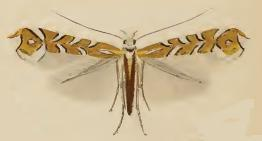
- Aristaea pavoniella

Scientific classification
- Kingdom: Animalia
- Phylum: Arthropoda
- Class: Insecta
- Order: Lepidoptera
- Family: Gracillariidae
- Subfamily: Gracillariinae
- Genus: Aristaea; Meyrick, 1907

Species
- See text

= Aristaea =

Genus of moths

Aristaea is a genus of moths in the family Gracillariidae.

== Species ==
- Aristaea acares (Turner, 1939)
- Aristaea amalopa (Meyrick, 1907)
- Aristaea atrata Triberti, 1985
- Aristaea bathracma (Meyrick, 1912)
- Aristaea eurygramma Vári, 1961
- Aristaea issikii Kumata, 1977
- Aristaea machaerophora (Turner, 1940)
- Aristaea onychota (Meyrick, 1908)
- Aristaea pavoniella (Zeller, 1847)
- Aristaea periphanes Meyrick, 1907
- Aristaea thalassias (Meyrick, 1880)
- Aristaea vietnamella Kuznetzov & Baryshnikova, 2001
