= Gibbovalva magnoliae =

Scientific classification
- Kingdom: Animalia
- Phylum: Arthropoda
- Class: Insecta
- Order: Lepidoptera
- Family: Gracillariidae
- Genus: Gibbovalva
- Species: G. magnoliae

Binomial name
- Gibbovalva magnoliae Kumata & Kuroko, 1988

Species of moth

Gibbovalva magnoliae is a moth of the family Gracillariidae. It is known from Japan (Hokkaidō and Honshū).

The wingspan is 6.8-9.2 mm.

The larvae feed on Magnolia heptapetala, Magnolia hypoleuca and Magnolia obovata. They mine the leaves of their host plant.
