= Macarostola coccinea =

Scientific classification
- Kingdom: Animalia
- Phylum: Arthropoda
- Clade: Pancrustacea
- Class: Insecta
- Order: Lepidoptera
- Family: Gracillariidae
- Genus: Macarostola
- Species: M. coccinea

Binomial name
- Macarostola coccinea (Walsingham, 1900)

Species of moth

Macarostola coccinea is a moth of the family Gracillariidae. It is known from Tamil Nadu, India.

The larvae feed on Myrtus species. They probably mine the leaves of their host plant.
