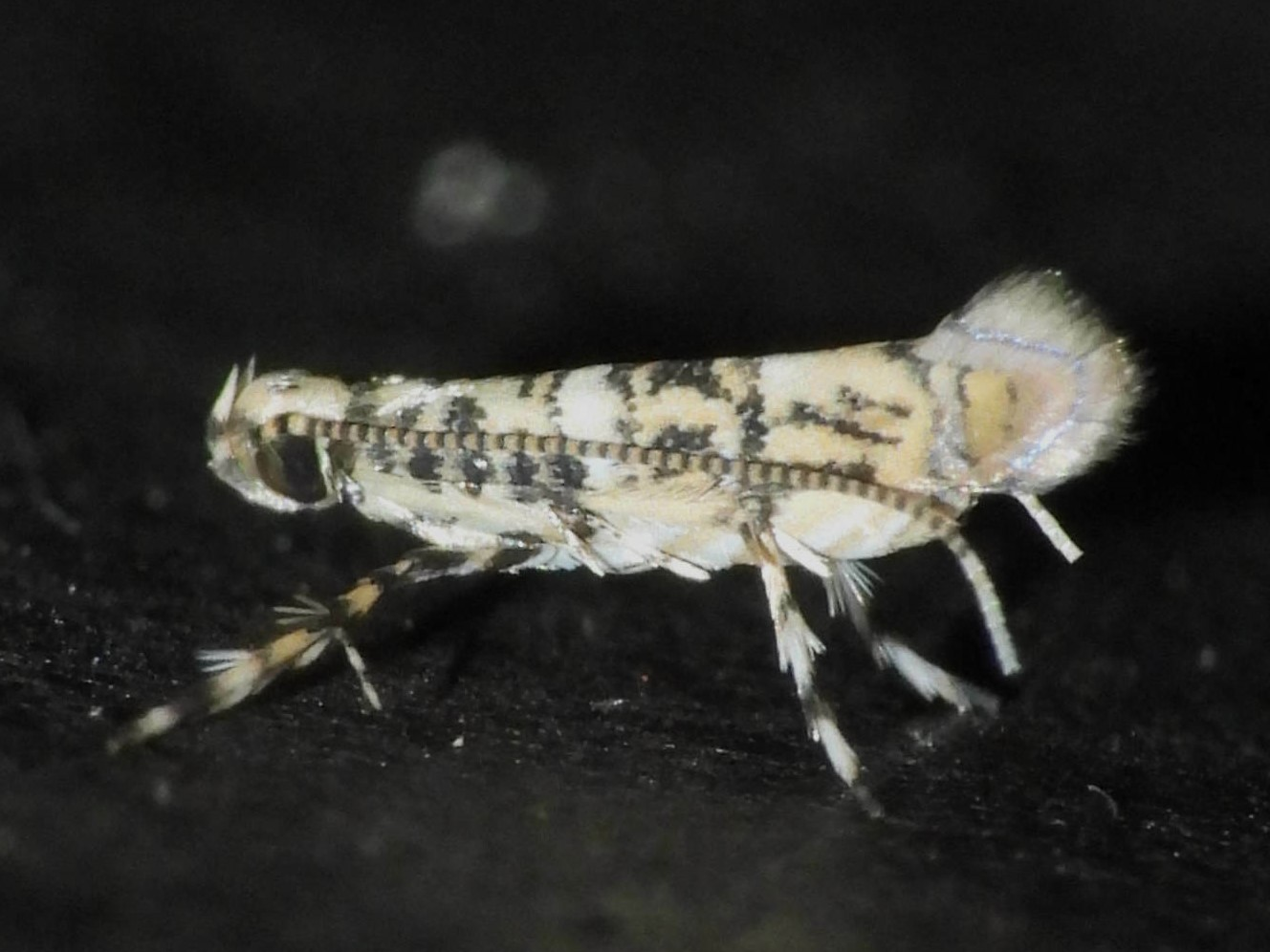

Scientific classification
- Kingdom: Animalia
- Phylum: Arthropoda
- Clade: Pancrustacea
- Class: Insecta
- Order: Lepidoptera
- Family: Gracillariidae
- Genus: Cuphodes
- Species: C. paragrapta

Binomial name
- Cuphodes paragrapta (Meyrick, 1915)

= Cuphodes paragrapta =

Species of moth

Cuphodes paragrapta is a species of moth in the family Gracillariidae. It is known to originate from Guyana.
