= Cuphodes diospyri =

Scientific classification
- Kingdom: Animalia
- Phylum: Arthropoda
- Class: Insecta
- Order: Lepidoptera
- Family: Gracillariidae
- Genus: Cuphodes
- Species: C. diospyri

Binomial name
- Cuphodes diospyri Vári, 1961

Species of moth

Cuphodes diospyri is a moth of the family Gracillariidae. It is known from South Africa.

The larvae feed on Diospyros natalensis. They mine the leaves of their host plant.
