= Gibbovalva =

Scientific classification
- Kingdom: Animalia
- Phylum: Arthropoda
- Class: Insecta
- Order: Lepidoptera
- Family: Gracillariidae
- Subfamily: Acrocercopinae
- Genus: Gibbovalva; Kumata & Kuroko, 1988

Species
- See text

Genus of moths

Gibbovalva is a genus of moths in the family Gracillariidae.

== Species ==
- Gibbovalva civica (Meyrick, 1914)
- Gibbovalva clavata Bai, 2016
- Gibbovalva kobusi Kumata & Kuroko, 1988
- Gibbovalva magnoliae Kumata & Kuroko, 1988
- Gibbovalva quadrifasciata (Stainton, 1862)
- Gibbovalva singularis Bai & Li, 2008
- Gibbovalva tricuneatella (Meyrick, 1880)
- Gibbovalva urbana (Meyrick, 1908)
