= Conopomorpha euphanes =

Scientific classification
- Kingdom: Animalia
- Phylum: Arthropoda
- Class: Insecta
- Order: Lepidoptera
- Family: Gracillariidae
- Genus: Conopomorpha
- Species: C. euphanes

Binomial name
- Conopomorpha euphanes Vári, 1961

Species of moth

Conopomorpha euphanes is a moth of the family Gracillariidae. It is known from South Africa and Namibia.

The larvae feed on Combretum apiculatum. They probably mine the leaves of their host plant.
