= Macarostola eugeniella =

Scientific classification
- Kingdom: Animalia
- Phylum: Arthropoda
- Class: Insecta
- Order: Lepidoptera
- Family: Gracillariidae
- Genus: Macarostola
- Species: M. eugeniella

Binomial name
- Macarostola eugeniella (Viette, 1951)

Synonyms
- Parectopa eugeniella Viette, 1951

Species of moth

Macarostola eugeniella is a moth of the family Gracillariidae. It is known from Madagascar, Mauritius and Réunion.

The larvae feed on Syzygium cumini and Syzygium jambos (Myrtaceae). They mine the leaves of their host plant.
