= Aristaea eurygramma =

Scientific classification
- Domain: Eukaryota
- Kingdom: Animalia
- Phylum: Arthropoda
- Class: Insecta
- Order: Lepidoptera
- Family: Gracillariidae
- Genus: Aristaea
- Species: A. eurygramma

Binomial name
- Aristaea eurygramma Vári, 1961

Species of moth

Aristaea eurygramma is a moth of the family Gracillariidae. It is known from South Africa.

The larvae feed on Lantana camara. They probably mine the leaves of their host plant.
