= Macarostola haemataula =

Scientific classification
- Kingdom: Animalia
- Phylum: Arthropoda
- Class: Insecta
- Order: Lepidoptera
- Family: Gracillariidae
- Genus: Macarostola
- Species: M. haemataula

Binomial name
- Macarostola haemataula (Meyrick, 1912)

Synonyms
- Parectopa haemataula

Species of moth

Macarostola haemataula is a moth of the family Gracillariidae. It is known from Karnataka, India.

Description: Thorax crimson. Forewings crimson, markings yellow-whitish, partially black-edged. Three triangular dorsal spots reaching half across wing.
