= Macarostola zehntneri =

Scientific classification
- Kingdom: Animalia
- Phylum: Arthropoda
- Class: Insecta
- Order: Lepidoptera
- Family: Gracillariidae
- Genus: Macarostola
- Species: M. zehntneri

Binomial name
- Macarostola zehntneri (Snellen, 1902)

Synonyms
- Pammeces zehntneri Snellen, 1902

Species of moth

Macarostola zehntneri is a moth of the family Gracillariidae. It is known from Maharashtra, India; Java, Indonesia; and Malaysia.

It has a wingspan of 10 mm.

The larvae feed on Eugenia aquea, Eugenia cumini and Eugenia jambolana. They probably mine the leaves of their host plant.
