= Metacercops hexactis =

Scientific classification
- Kingdom: Animalia
- Phylum: Arthropoda
- Class: Insecta
- Order: Lepidoptera
- Family: Gracillariidae
- Genus: Metacercops
- Species: M. hexactis

Binomial name
- Metacercops hexactis Meyrick, 1932

Species of moth

Metacercops hexactis is a moth of the family Gracillariidae. It is known from Ethiopia.
