= Conopomorpha cyanospila =

Scientific classification
- Kingdom: Animalia
- Phylum: Arthropoda
- Clade: Pancrustacea
- Class: Insecta
- Order: Lepidoptera
- Family: Gracillariidae
- Genus: Conopomorpha
- Species: C. cyanospila

Binomial name
- Conopomorpha cyanospila Meyrick, 1885

Synonyms
- Acrocercops cyanospila (Meyrick, 1885)

Species of moth endemic to New Zealand

Conopomorpha cyanospila is a moth of the family Gracillariidae. This species was first described by Edward Meyrick in 1885 and is the type species for the genus Conopomorpha. It is endemic to New Zealand and has been observed in the North Island and the northern half of the South Island. This species inhabits dense native forest. The larvae of this species feed on the fruit and seeds of Alectryon excelsus. When mature the larvae pupate in cocoons on the underside of leaves of their host tree. Adults are on the wing from November until March and are attracted to light. The adult moth commonly rests pressed close to the tree trunk upon which it is resting with the four anterior legs extended laterally. This position helps conceal the moth from predators.

== Taxonomy ==
This species was first described by Edward Meyrick in 1885. It is the type species for its genus. Meyrick gave a fuller description of this species in 1886. George Hudson discussed and illustrated this species under the name Acrocercops cyanospila in his 1928 book The butterflies and moths of New Zealand. In 1988 John S. Dugdale discussed this species under the name Conopomorpha cyanospila. The female lectotype, collected in New Plymouth by Meyrick, is held at the Natural History Museum, London.

== Description ==
Illustration by Hudson.

Meyrick described the adults of this species as follows:

Male, female. — 12-14 mm. Head ochreous-whitish, sometimes suffused with fuscous. Palpi whitish, second joint dark fuscous except apex, terminal joint with dark fuscous band and subapical ring. Antennae grey. Thorax ochreous-whitish, mixed with dark fuscous. Abdomen grey. Legs dark fuscous, apex of joints and oblique bands of tibiae whitish. Forewings dark fuscous, irregularly mixed with whitish-ochreous, tending to form small scattered cloudy spots or strigulae ; costa dotted with whitish, with three white strigulae towards base, first two rather inwardly, third outwardly oblique, a suffused pair beyond middle, and three oblique pairs towards apex, first of these meeting a similar pair from inner margin, preceded in disc by a small white spot, and followed by a metallic-blue spot ; two oblique whitish strigulae from inner margin beyond middle, and sometimes one or two others beneath fold ; a transverse metallic-blue ante-apical line ; a small metallic-blue apical spot : cilia grey, round apex whitish, with dark fuscous lines. Hindwings dark fuscous ; cilia grey.

== Distribution ==
C. cyanospila is endemic to New Zealand. It has been observed in the North Island and the northern half of the South Island.

== Habitat and hosts ==
Fruit of larval host plant A. excelsus.

Cocoon of C. cyanospila.

This species inhabits dense native forest. The larvae feeds concealed in the berries of their host plant Alectryon excelsus. The larvae enter the young fruit by boring holes into the walls of the fruit capsule and the seeds it contains. After tunnelling into the capsule the larvae kill the seed by consuming it. When mature the larvae pupate by spinning cocoons on the underside of the leaves of their host tree. The cocoon is oval shaped, brown in colour and has the texture of parchment.

== Behaviour ==
Adults are attracted to light. When at rest the adults sit with either the forepart of its body is raised or, more commonly, closely pressed to the surface upon which the moth is resting and with the four anterior legs extended laterally. This latter position helps to conceal the moth on the tree trunks upon which it usually rests. Adults are on the wing commonly from November until March.
