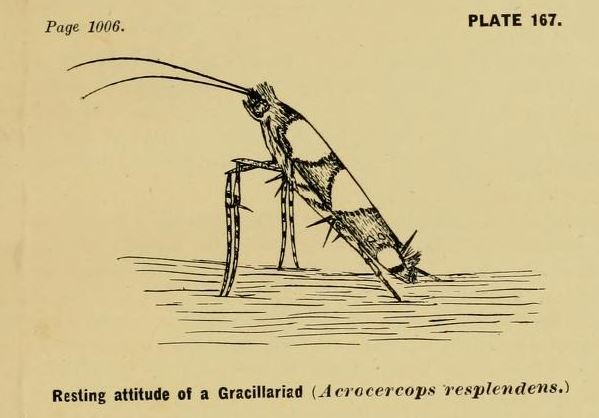

Scientific classification
- Kingdom: Animalia
- Phylum: Arthropoda
- Clade: Pancrustacea
- Class: Insecta
- Order: Lepidoptera
- Family: Gracillariidae
- Genus: Monocercops
- Species: M. resplendens

Binomial name
- Monocercops resplendens (Stainton, 1862)

Synonyms
- Gracilaria resplendens Stainton, 1863; Acrocercops resplendens

= Monocercops resplendens =

Species of moth

Monocercops resplendens is a moth of the family Gracillariidae. It is known from India (West Bengal, Meghalaya, Uttaranchal) and Nepal.

The wingspan is 6.7–9.9 mm.

The larvae feed on Shorea robusta. They mine the leaves of their host plant.
