= Conopomorpha fustigera =

Scientific classification
- Kingdom: Animalia
- Phylum: Arthropoda
- Class: Insecta
- Order: Lepidoptera
- Family: Gracillariidae
- Genus: Conopomorpha
- Species: C. fustigera

Binomial name
- Conopomorpha fustigera (Meyrick, 1928)

Synonyms
- Acrocercops fustigera Meyrick, 1928

Species of moth

Conopomorpha fustigera is a moth of the family Gracillariidae. It is known from South Africa and Uganda.

The larvae feed on Panicum and Sorghum species. They probably mine the leaves of their host plant.
