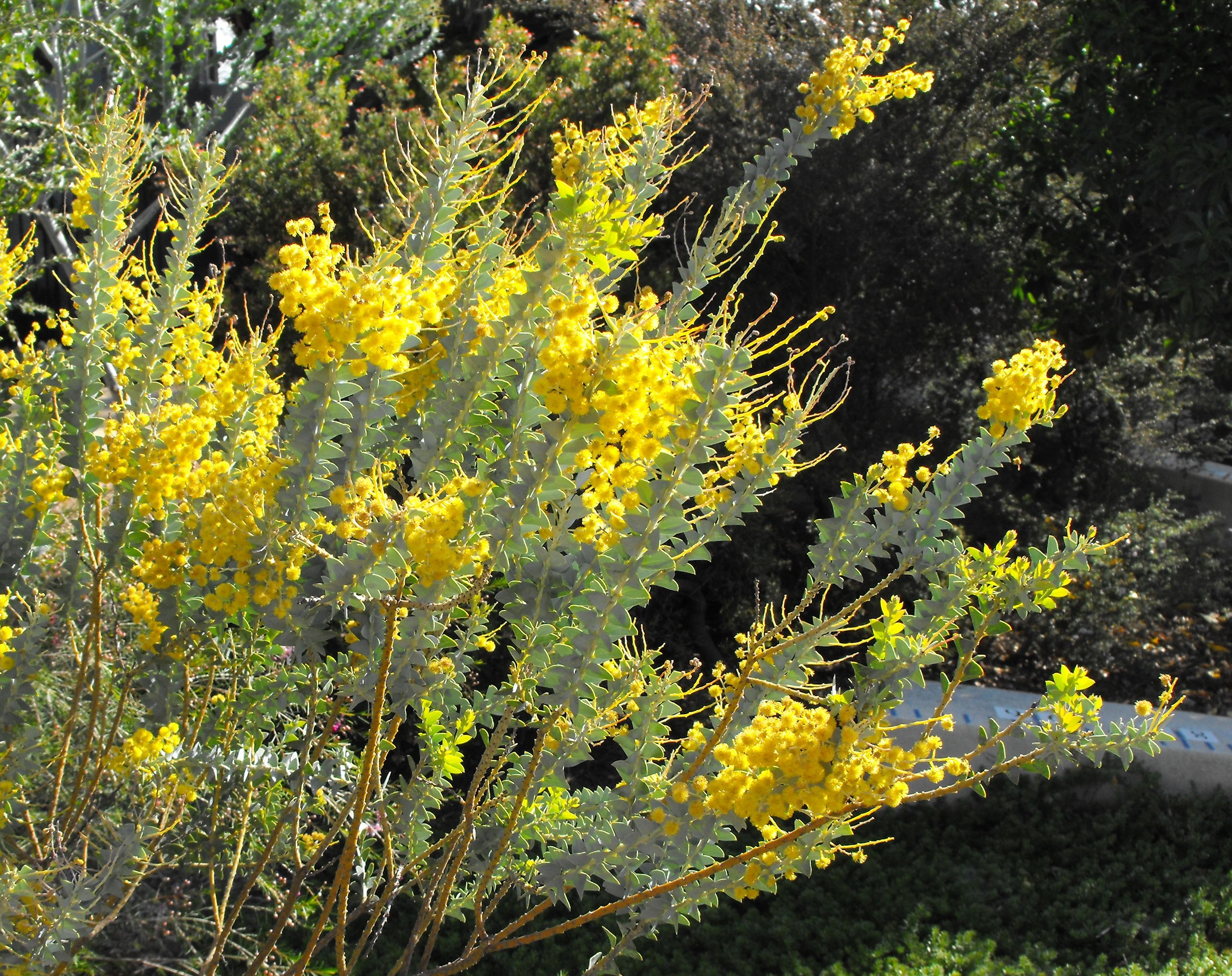

Scientific classification
- Kingdom: Plantae
- Clade: Tracheophytes
- Clade: Angiosperms
- Clade: Eudicots
- Clade: Rosids
- Order: Fabales
- Family: Fabaceae
- Subfamily: Caesalpinioideae
- Clade: Mimosoid clade
- Genus: Acacia
- Species: A. cultriformis

Binomial name
- Acacia cultriformis A.Cunn. ex G.Don

Synonyms
- List: Acacia claucifolia A.Baumann & N.Baumann nom. inval., nom. nud.; Acacia cultrata Paxton; Acacia cultriformis var. albicans Chopinet nom. inval.; Acacia cultriformis var. glaucescens Chopinet nom. inval.; Acacia glaucifolia Meisn.; Acacia glaucophylla F.Cels; Acacia glaucophylla Lem. nom. illeg.; Acacia papuliformis A.Cunn. ex Loudon nom. inval., nom. nud.; Acacia papuliformis G.Don nom. inval., pro syn.; Acacia scapuliformis A.Cunn. ex G.Don; Racosperma cultriforme (A.Cunn. ex G.Don) Pedley

= Acacia cultriformis =

Knife-leaf wattle

Species of legume

Acacia cultriformis, known as knife-leaf wattle, dogtooth wattle, half-moon wattle or golden-glow wattle, is a species of flowering plant in the family Fabaceae and is endemic to eastern Australia. It is widely cultivated, and has been found to have naturalised in Asia, Africa, North America, New Zealand and South America. A. cultriformis grows to a height of about 4 m (13 ft) and has triangle-shaped phyllodes. The yellow flowers appear from August to November in its natural range. Its attractive foliage and bright flowers make it a popular garden plant.

== Description ==
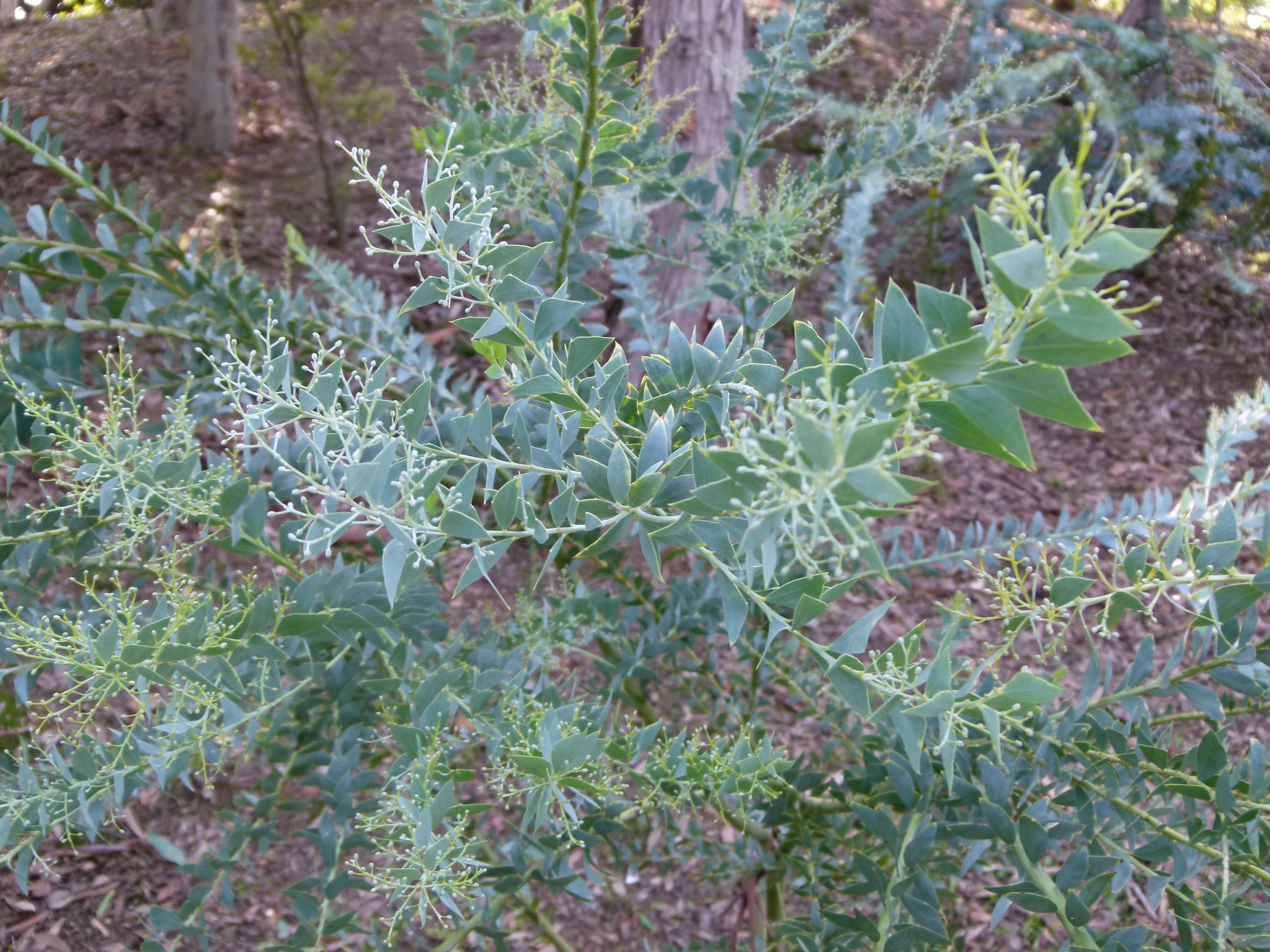
Triangle-shaped leaves

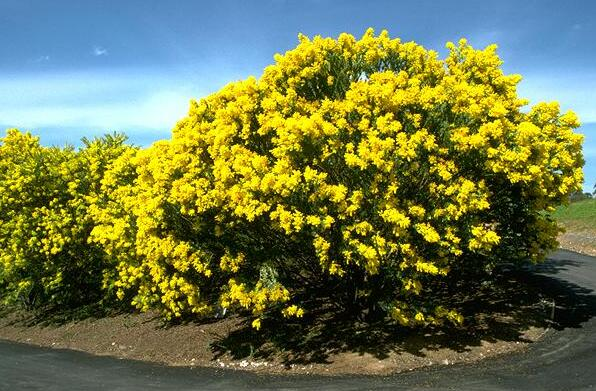
Habit in the Mount Annan Botanic Gardens

Acacia cultriformis is a woody shrub with an upright or spreading habit that grows up to 4 m (13 ft) high. Its branchlets may be bare and smooth or covered with a white bloom. The phyllodes are rather crowded, leathery, green-grey and asymmetrical, 10–30 mm (0.39–1.18 in) long and 5–15 mm (0.20–0.59 in) wide, with one leaf margin angled so the overall shape is triangular. There is a rather prominent gland at the widest part of the phyllode. Flowering takes place from August to November,

The flowers are borne in spherical or shortly cylindrical heads in racemes 10–50 mm (0.39–1.97 in) long, (sometimes up to 200 mm (7.9 in) long) in axils, on peduncles 2.5–5 mm (0.098–0.197 in) long. Each head contains 13 to 40 bright golden yellow flowers. Flowering occurs from August to November and can be prolific on upper parts of the plant. The pods are narrowly oblong, straight or slightly curved, more or less flat raised over the seeds, up to 90 mm (3.5 in) long and 5–8 mm (0.20–0.31 in) wide and firmly papery to thinly leathery. The seeds are 3.5–4.5 mm (0.14–0.18 in) long, black and dull to slightly shiny, with a club-shaped aril.

The related Acacia semilunata is similar in appearance but has hairy branchlets and narrower seed pods. Acacia pravissima can look similar but has a secondary longitudinal vein in its phyllodes.

== Taxonomy ==
Acacia cultriformis was first formally described in 1832 by Scottish botanist George Don in his book, A General History of Dichlamydeous Plants, and Don gave it the common name 'cultriform-leaved acacia'. The specific epithet (cultriformis) means 'curved like a short wide scimitar'.

Queensland botanist Les Pedley reclassified the species as Racosperma cultriforme in 2003, in his proposal to reclassify almost all Australian members of the genus into the new genus Racosperma. This name is treated as a synonym of Acacia cultriformis by the Australian Plant Census.

== Distribution and habitat ==
Acacia cultriformis is found on the western slopes of the Great Dividing Range in central New South Wales and southern Queensland. It occurs discontinuously north from Wagga Wagga and Narrandera to west of the Denman - Singleton area, and to Stanthorpe and Inglewood in south-eastern Queensland. It grows in clay-loam or sandstone soils in Eucalyptus woodland, often on rocky ridges.

== Uses and cultivation ==
Its bright flowers and attractive leaves make Acacia cultriformis one of the most popular wattles in cultivation. Adaptable to the garden, it is grown in a wide range of soils and can tolerate frosts. It grows in sun or part shade. Drought tolerant, it can be used to combat soil erosion. Acacia 'Cascade' (RN: ACC154) is a prostrate form that spreads to a diameter of 2 m (7 ft). It was registered on 18 November 1982, having been propagated by Bill Molyneux at his nursery in Montrose, Victoria from a selected seedling. It makes an attractive cascading plant in a rockery.

A. cultriformis is used as cut flowers. The flowers are edible and they are an ingredient used in some fritters. Yellow dye is extracted from the flowers and green dye is extracted from the seed pods.

== See also ==
- List of Acacia species
- International Cultivar Registration Authority
