= Conopomorpha sinensis =

Scientific classification
- Domain: Eukaryota
- Kingdom: Animalia
- Phylum: Arthropoda
- Class: Insecta
- Order: Lepidoptera
- Family: Gracillariidae
- Genus: Conopomorpha
- Species: C. sinensis

Binomial name
- Conopomorpha sinensis Bradley, 1986

Species of moth

The litchi fruit borer or the litchi stem-end borer (Conopomorpha sinensis) is a moth of the family Gracillariidae. It is present in China (Hainan, Fujian, Hong Kong and Guangdong), India, Nepal, Taiwan, Thailand and Vietnam.

The wingspan is 12–15 mm. Adults are greyish brown with a yellowish brown wing apex. The hindwings are silver grey.

The larvae feed on Dimocarpus longan, Litchi chinensis, Nephelium longana and Theobroma cacao. They feed on the fruit and the shoots of their host plant. It is considered a serious pest of litchi fruit.
