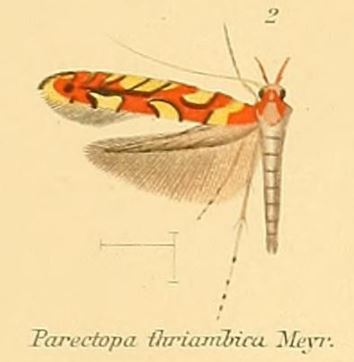

Scientific classification
- Kingdom: Animalia
- Phylum: Arthropoda
- Class: Insecta
- Order: Lepidoptera
- Family: Gracillariidae
- Genus: Macarostola
- Species: M. thriambica

Binomial name
- Macarostola thriambica (Meyrick, 1907)

Synonyms
- Gracilaria thriambica Meyrick, 1908; Paracetopa thriambica Meyrick, 1912

= Macarostola thriambica =

Species of moth

Macarostola thriambica is a moth of the family Gracillariidae. It is known from Sri Lanka.
