= Monocercops thoi =

Scientific classification
- Kingdom: Animalia
- Phylum: Arthropoda
- Class: Insecta
- Order: Lepidoptera
- Family: Gracillariidae
- Genus: Monocercops
- Species: M. thoi

Binomial name
- Monocercops thoi Kumata, 1989

Species of moth

Monocercops thoi is a moth of the family Gracillariidae. It is known from Malaysia (Selangor).

The wingspan is 8.3-9.7 mm.

The larvae feed on Castanopsis inermis. They mine the leaves of their host plant.
