= Aristaea onychota =

Scientific classification
- Domain: Eukaryota
- Kingdom: Animalia
- Phylum: Arthropoda
- Class: Insecta
- Order: Lepidoptera
- Family: Gracillariidae
- Genus: Aristaea
- Species: A. onychota

Binomial name
- Aristaea onychota (Meyrick, 1908)

Synonyms
- Macarostola onychota Meyrick, 1908

Species of moth

Aristaea onychota is a moth of the family Gracillariidae. It is known from Nigeria, Réunion, São Tomé and Príncipe, South Africa and Zambia.

The larvae feed on Lantana camara, Lantana rugosa, and Lippia javanica. They mine the leaves of their host plant.
