= Macarostola pontificalis =

Scientific classification
- Kingdom: Animalia
- Phylum: Arthropoda
- Class: Insecta
- Order: Lepidoptera
- Family: Gracillariidae
- Genus: Macarostola
- Species: M. pontificalis

Binomial name
- Macarostola pontificalis (Meyrick, 1928)

Synonyms
- Parectopa pontificalis Meyrick, 1928

Species of moth

Macarostola pontificalis is a moth of the family Gracillariidae. It is known from the Austral Islands (Rapa and Rurutu) of French Polynesia.

The larvae feed on Metrosideros collina. They mine the leaves of their host plant.
