= Macarostola tegulata =

Scientific classification
- Kingdom: Animalia
- Phylum: Arthropoda
- Class: Insecta
- Order: Lepidoptera
- Family: Gracillariidae
- Genus: Macarostola
- Species: M. tegulata

Binomial name
- Macarostola tegulata Meyrick, 1908

Species of moth

Macarostola tegulata is a moth of the family Gracillariidae. It is known from Meghalaya, India.

The head of this species is whitish, sides of face crimson-pink, crown partially yellow suffused, collar crimson-pink. Palpi smooth scaled, crimson-pink, terminal joint and apex of second white. Antennae ochreous-whitish. Thorax crimson, posteriorly yellow with a crimson spot.
