= Aristaea bathracma =

Scientific classification
- Kingdom: Animalia
- Phylum: Arthropoda
- Class: Insecta
- Order: Lepidoptera
- Family: Gracillariidae
- Genus: Aristaea
- Species: A. bathracma

Binomial name
- Aristaea bathracma (Meyrick, 1912)

Synonyms
- Parectopa bathracma Meyrick, 1912; Aristaea asteris Kumata, 1977

Species of moth

Aristaea bathracma is a species of moth of the family Gracillariidae. It is known from China, Thailand, Japan (Honshū), the Russian Far East, Mozambique, South Africa, Réunion and Uganda.

The wingspan is 7.2-8.8 mm.

The larvae feed on Aster ageratoides. They mine the leaves of their host plant.
