= Gibbovalva kobusi =

Scientific classification
- Kingdom: Animalia
- Phylum: Arthropoda
- Class: Insecta
- Order: Lepidoptera
- Family: Gracillariidae
- Genus: Gibbovalva
- Species: G. kobusi

Binomial name
- Gibbovalva kobusi Kumata & Kuroko, 1988

Species of moth

Gibbovalva kobusi is a moth of the family Gracillariidae. It is known from China (Guizhou, Zhejiang, Hunan and Guangxi) and Japan (Hokkaidō and Honshū).

The wingspan is 6.5-9.2 mm.

The larvae feed on Magnolia kobus. They probably mine the leaves of their host plant.
