= Cuphodes dolichocera =

Scientific classification
- Kingdom: Animalia
- Phylum: Arthropoda
- Class: Insecta
- Order: Lepidoptera
- Family: Gracillariidae
- Genus: Cuphodes
- Species: C. dolichocera

Binomial name
- Cuphodes dolichocera Vári, 1961

Species of moth

Cuphodes dolichocera is a moth of the family Gracillariidae. It is known from South Africa.
