= Cuphodes leucocera =

Scientific classification
- Kingdom: Animalia
- Phylum: Arthropoda
- Class: Insecta
- Order: Lepidoptera
- Family: Gracillariidae
- Genus: Cuphodes
- Species: C. leucocera

Binomial name
- Cuphodes leucocera Vári, 1961

Species of moth

Cuphodes leucocera is a moth of the family Gracillariidae. It is known from South Africa.
