= Cuphodes melanostola =

Scientific classification
- Kingdom: Animalia
- Phylum: Arthropoda
- Clade: Pancrustacea
- Class: Insecta
- Order: Lepidoptera
- Family: Gracillariidae
- Genus: Cuphodes
- Species: C. melanostola

Binomial name
- Cuphodes melanostola Meyrick, 1918

Synonyms
- Phrixosceles melanostola Meyrick, 1918

Species of moth

Cuphodes melanostola is a moth of the family Gracillariidae. It is known from South Africa.
