= Macarostola parolca =

Scientific classification
- Kingdom: Animalia
- Phylum: Arthropoda
- Clade: Pancrustacea
- Class: Insecta
- Order: Lepidoptera
- Family: Gracillariidae
- Genus: Macarostola
- Species: M. parolca

Binomial name
- Macarostola parolca Meyrick, 1911

Species of moth

Macarostola parolca is a moth of the family Gracillariidae. It is known from the Seychelles.
