= Monocercops triangulata =

Scientific classification
- Kingdom: Animalia
- Phylum: Arthropoda
- Class: Insecta
- Order: Lepidoptera
- Family: Gracillariidae
- Genus: Monocercops
- Species: M. triangulata

Binomial name
- Monocercops triangulata Kumata, 1989

Species of moth

Monocercops triangulata is a moth of the family Gracillariidae. It is known from Nepal.

The wingspan is 7.6–8.7 mm.

The larvae feed on Castanopsis species. They mine the leaves of their host plant.
