= Gibbovalva singularis =

Scientific classification
- Domain: Eukaryota
- Kingdom: Animalia
- Phylum: Arthropoda
- Class: Insecta
- Order: Lepidoptera
- Family: Gracillariidae
- Genus: Gibbovalva
- Species: G. singularis

Binomial name
- Gibbovalva singularis Bai & Li, 2008

Species of moth

Gibbovalva singularis is a moth of the family Gracillariidae. It is known from China (Guizhou, Zhejiang, Anhui and Hong Kong).
