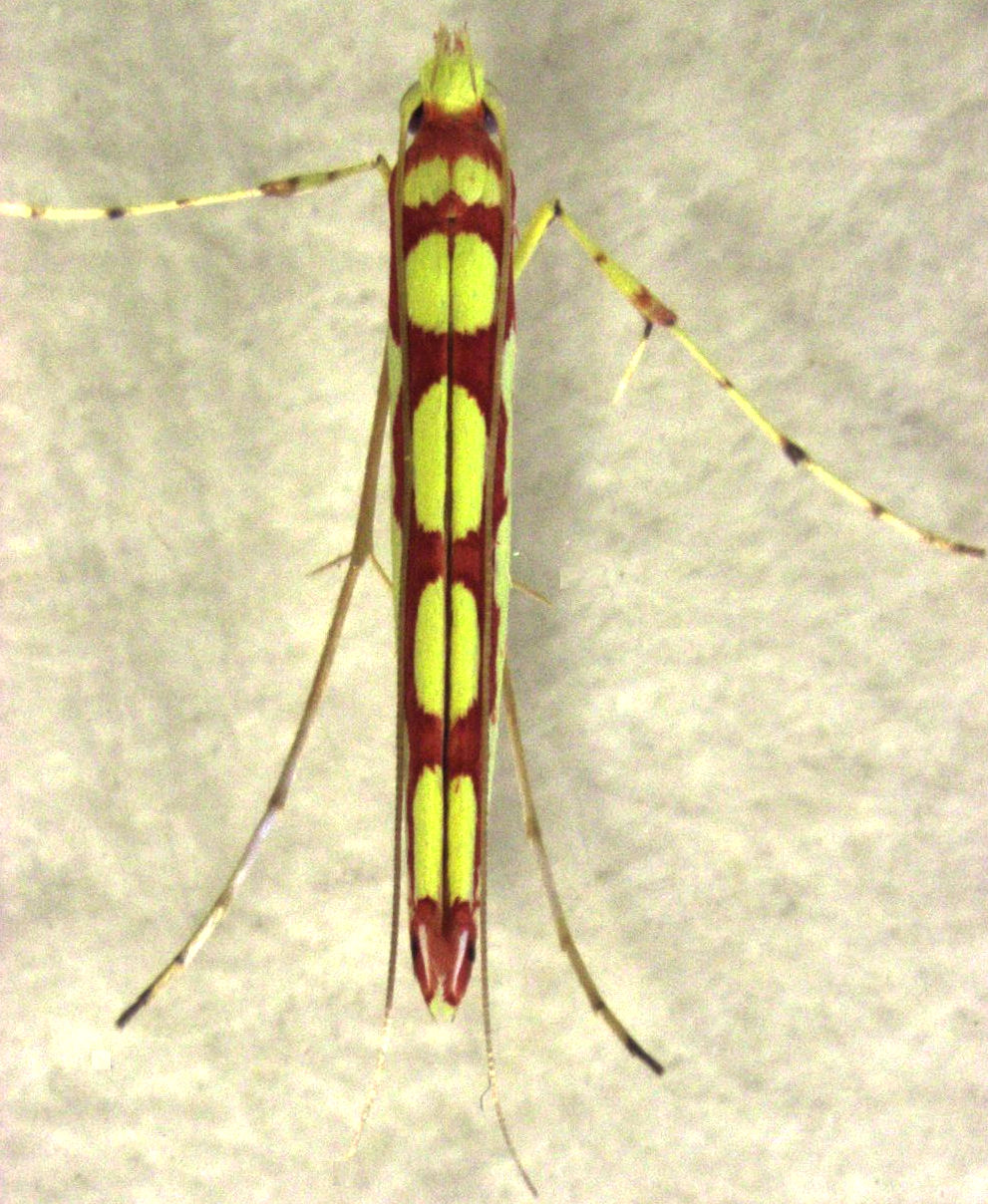

Scientific classification
- Kingdom: Animalia
- Phylum: Arthropoda
- Class: Insecta
- Order: Lepidoptera
- Family: Gracillariidae
- Genus: Macarostola
- Species: M. miniella

Binomial name
- Macarostola miniella (Felder & Rogenhofer, 1875)

Synonyms
- Parectopa miniella (Felder & Rogenhofer, 1875); Stathmopoda miniella Felder & Rogenhofer, 1875; Gracilaria ethela Meyrick, 1880

= Macarostola miniella =

Species of moth

Macarostola miniella is a species of moth in the family Gracillariidae. It is endemic to New Zealand. This species is only found in the North Island and the adult moths have two different colour variations.

== Taxonomy ==
This species was first described by Baron Cajetan von Felder and Alois Friedrich Rogenhofer in 1875 under the name Stathmopoda miniella. Edward Meyrick, thinking he was describing a new species, named it Gracilaria ethela in 1880. Meyrick synonymised this name with S. miniella in 1889. George Hudson discussed and illustrated this species under the name Parectopa miniella in his 1928 book The butterflies and moths of New Zealand. John S. Dugdale assigned this species to the genus Macraostola in 1988. The holotype specimen, collected in Auckland, is held at the Natural History Museum, London.

== Description ==
Meyrick described the species as follows:

♂︎♀︎. 11-13mm. Head yellow on crown, crimson behind, face snow-white with two pale crimson spots. Palpi white, second joint crimson. Thorax yellow, anterior margin and a posterior spot crimson. Forewings pale yellow, deeper towards inner margin; a bright crimson undulating central streak from base to apex, sometimes margined with dark fuscous above, connected with inner margin by perpendicular bars near base and at 1/4, 1/2, and 3/4, and connected with costa at and near base; a round crimson apical spot, containing a blackish spot towards costa, and a white triangular spot on inner margin : cilia yellow round apex, with a dark fuscous hook, crimson below apical spot, thence very pale crimson. Hindwings light crimson, cilia very pale crimson, on costa grey.

The adult moths of this species come in two colour variations. The more common variation is the crimson and yellow form. The other variation has more dull fuscous colouration replacing the crimson.

== Distribution ==
This species is endemic to New Zealand. M. miniella is common and found throughout the North Island.

== Behaviour and life history ==
The larvae of M. miniella are leaf miners that later in their development also roll the leaves of their host plant, both to feed from and then to pupate in.

== Habitat and host plant ==
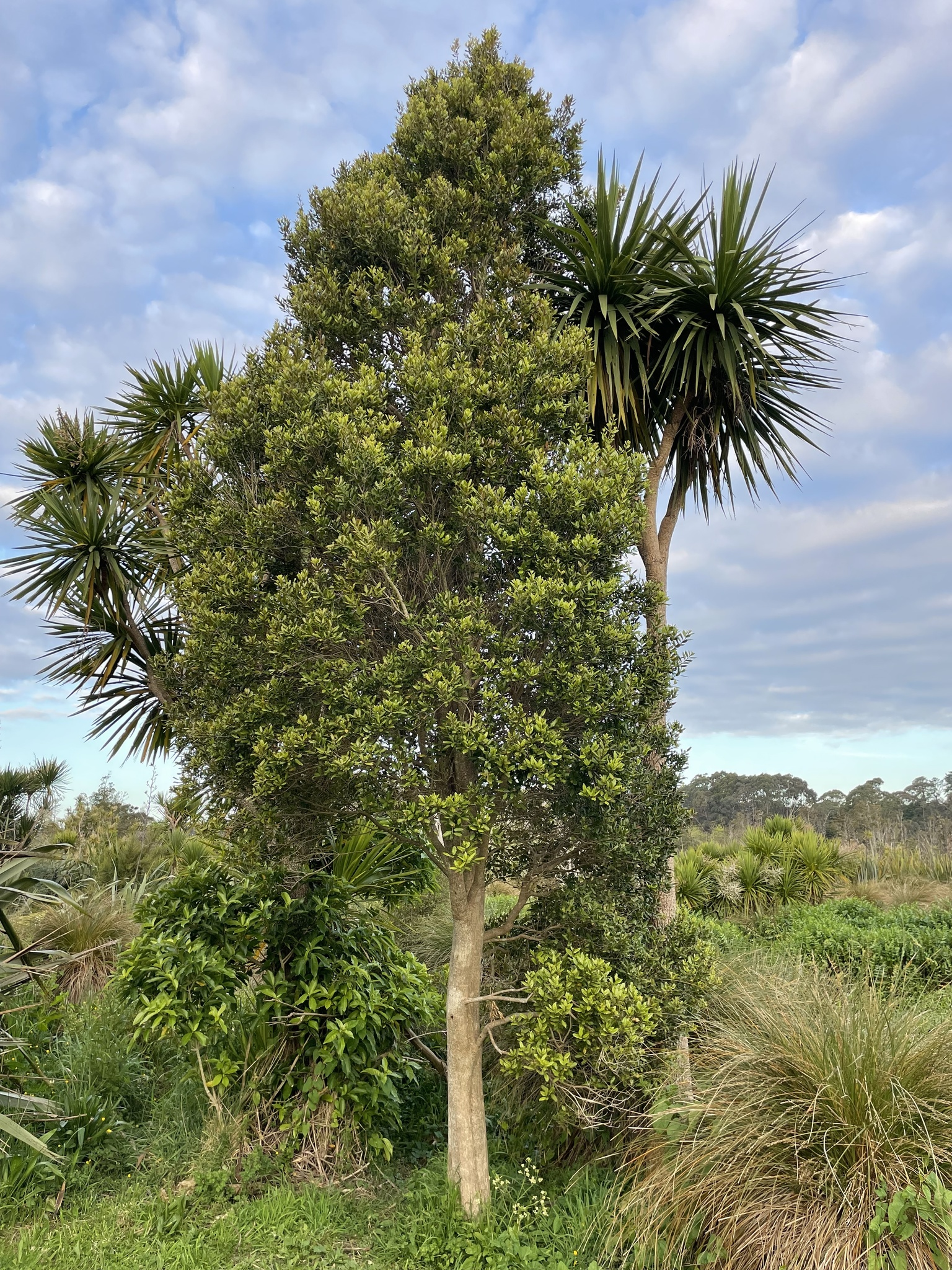
Larval host Syzygium maire also known as Swamp Maire.

This species is found in native forest habitat. The larvae are leaf miners on Syzygium maire, a tree species also endemic to New Zealand.
