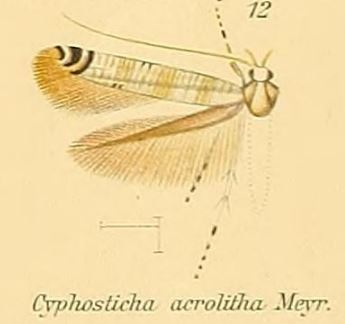

Scientific classification
- Kingdom: Animalia
- Phylum: Arthropoda
- Class: Insecta
- Order: Lepidoptera
- Family: Gracillariidae
- Genus: Cyphosticha
- Species: C. acrolitha

Binomial name
- Cyphosticha acrolitha Meyrick, 1908

= Cyphosticha acrolitha =

Species of moth

Cyphosticha acrolitha is a moth of the family Gracillariidae. It is known from Sri Lanka.
