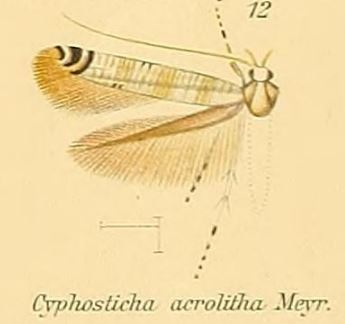
- Cyphosticha acrolitha

Scientific classification
- Kingdom: Animalia
- Phylum: Arthropoda
- Class: Insecta
- Order: Lepidoptera
- Family: Gracillariidae
- Subfamily: Ornixolinae
- Genus: Cyphosticha; Meyrick, 1907

Species
- See text

= Cyphosticha =

Genus of moths

Cyphosticha is a genus of moths in the family Gracillariidae.

== Species ==
- Cyphosticha acrolitha Meyrick, 1908
- Cyphosticha albomarginata (Stainton, 1862)
- Cyphosticha callimacha (Meyrick, 1920)
- Cyphosticha dialeuca Turner, 1940
- Cyphosticha microta (Turner, 1894)
- Cyphosticha panconita Turner, 1913
- Cyphosticha pandoxa Turner, 1913
- Cyphosticha pterocola Meyrick, 1914
- Cyphosticha pyrochroma (Turner, 1894)
