= Macarostola pyrelictis =

Scientific classification
- Kingdom: Animalia
- Phylum: Arthropoda
- Class: Insecta
- Order: Lepidoptera
- Family: Gracillariidae
- Genus: Macarostola
- Species: M. pyrelictis

Binomial name
- Macarostola pyrelictis (Meyrick, 1927)

Species of moth

Macarostola pyrelictis is a moth of the family Gracillariidae. It is known from Samoa.
