= Aristaea vietnamella =

Scientific classification
- Domain: Eukaryota
- Kingdom: Animalia
- Phylum: Arthropoda
- Class: Insecta
- Order: Lepidoptera
- Family: Gracillariidae
- Genus: Aristaea
- Species: A. vietnamella

Binomial name
- Aristaea vietnamella Kuznetzov & Baryshnikova, 2001

Species of moth

Aristaea vietnamella is a moth of the family Gracillariidae. It is known from Vietnam.
