= Cuphodes plexigrapha =

Scientific classification
- Kingdom: Animalia
- Phylum: Arthropoda
- Class: Insecta
- Order: Lepidoptera
- Family: Gracillariidae
- Genus: Cuphodes
- Species: C. plexigrapha

Binomial name
- Cuphodes plexigrapha (Meyrick, 1916)

Species of moth

Cuphodes plexigrapha is a moth of the family Gracillariidae. It is known from Bihar and Tamil Nadu, India.

The larvae feed on Caesalpinia species, including Cajanus cajan and Cajanus indicus. They probably mine the leaves of their host plant.
