= Macarostola thiasodes =

Scientific classification
- Kingdom: Animalia
- Phylum: Arthropoda
- Class: Insecta
- Order: Lepidoptera
- Family: Gracillariidae
- Genus: Macarostola
- Species: M. thiasodes

Binomial name
- Macarostola thiasodes (Meyrick, 1912)

Synonyms
- Parectopa thiasodes Meyrick, 1912

Species of moth

Macarostola thiasodes is a moth of the family Gracillariidae. It is known from Sri Lanka.
