= Macarostola ceryx =

Scientific classification
- Kingdom: Animalia
- Phylum: Arthropoda
- Class: Insecta
- Order: Lepidoptera
- Family: Gracillariidae
- Genus: Macarostola
- Species: M. ceryx

Binomial name
- Macarostola ceryx (Diakonoff, 1955)

Species of moth

Macarostola ceryx is a moth of the family Gracillariidae. It is known from Papua New Guinea.
