= Acrocercops didymella =

Scientific classification
- Domain: Eukaryota
- Kingdom: Animalia
- Phylum: Arthropoda
- Class: Insecta
- Order: Lepidoptera
- Family: Gracillariidae
- Genus: Acrocercops
- Species: A. didymella

Binomial name
- Acrocercops didymella (Meyrick, 1880)

Synonyms
- Gracilaria didymella Meyrick, 1880

Species of moth

Acrocercops didymella is a moth of the family Gracillariidae. It is known in Australia from the states of New South Wales, Victoria, South Australia and Western Australia.

The larvae feed on Acacia cultriformis and Acacia longifolia. They probably mine the leaves of their host plant.
