= Monocercops nepalensis =

Scientific classification
- Kingdom: Animalia
- Phylum: Arthropoda
- Class: Insecta
- Order: Lepidoptera
- Family: Gracillariidae
- Genus: Monocercops
- Species: M. nepalensis

Binomial name
- Monocercops nepalensis Kumata, 1989

Species of moth

Monocercops nepalensis is a moth of the family Gracillariidae. It is known from Nepal.

The wingspan is 6.2–9.5 mm.

The larvae feed on Castanopsis indica. They mine the leaves of their host plant.
