= Gibbovalva quadrifasciata =

- Gibbovalva quadrifasciata in Australia

Scientific classification
- Kingdom: Animalia
- Phylum: Arthropoda
- Clade: Pancrustacea
- Class: Insecta
- Order: Lepidoptera
- Family: Gracillariidae
- Genus: Gibbovalva
- Species: G. quadrifasciata

Binomial name
- Gibbovalva quadrifasciata (Stainton, 1863)

Synonyms
- Gracilaria quadrifasciata Stainton, 1863; Gracilaria ordinatella Meyrick, 1880; Gibbovalva ornatella Kuznetzov, 1999

Species of moth

Gibbovalva quadrifasciata is a moth of the family Gracillariidae. It is known from Australia (New South Wales, Queensland), China (Yunnan, Guangdong, Hong Kong), India (Karnataka, West Bengal), Java, Japan (Honshū, the Ryukyu Islands, Shikoku), Myanmar, Sri Lanka and Taiwan.

The wingspan is 7-8.5 mm.

The larvae feed on Alseodaphne semecarpifolia, Cinnamomum species (Cinnamomum camphora, Cinnamomum cassia and Cinnamomum japonicum), Litsea species (including Litsea dealbata, Litsea japonica and Litsea monopetala), Neolitsea polyantha, Persea americana, Persea thunbergii and Phoebe lanceolata. They mine the leaves of their host plant.
