= Macarostola paradisia =

Scientific classification
- Kingdom: Animalia
- Phylum: Arthropoda
- Class: Insecta
- Order: Lepidoptera
- Family: Gracillariidae
- Genus: Macarostola
- Species: M. paradisia

Binomial name
- Macarostola paradisia Meyrick, 1908

Species of moth

Macarostola paradisia is a moth of the family Gracillariidae. It is known from Sri Lanka.

The head of this species is ochreous-whitish, palpi smooth-scaled, crimson-pink. Legs white, partially suffused with yellowish. Forewings light crimson; base narrowly pale yellowish, a moderate subquadrate yellow spot on dorsum towards base; two elongate yellow spots on dorsum before and beyond middle of the wing.
