= Metacercops =

Scientific classification
- Kingdom: Animalia
- Phylum: Arthropoda
- Class: Insecta
- Order: Lepidoptera
- Family: Gracillariidae
- Subfamily: Acrocercopinae
- Genus: Metacercops; Vári, 1961

Species
- See text

Genus of moths

Metacercops is a genus of moths in the family Gracillariidae.

== Species ==
- Metacercops cuphomorpha (Turner, 1940)
- Metacercops hexactis (Meyrick, 1932)
- Metacercops praestricta (Meyrick, 1918)
