= Gibbovalva urbana =

Scientific classification
- Kingdom: Animalia
- Phylum: Arthropoda
- Class: Insecta
- Order: Lepidoptera
- Family: Gracillariidae
- Genus: Gibbovalva
- Species: G. urbana

Binomial name
- Gibbovalva urbana (Meyrick, 1908)

Synonyms
- Acrocercops urbana Meyrick, 1908

Species of moth

Gibbovalva urbana is a moth of the family Gracillariidae. It is known from China (Guangdong, Hainan and Fujian), India (Meghalaya) and Japan (the Ryukyu Islands, Honshū and Tusima).

The wingspan is 6–9 mm.

The larvae feed on Magnolia species (including Magnolia denudata, Magnolia sieboldii and Magnolia × soulangeana), Michelia alba, Michelia champaca, Michelia compressa and Michelia figo. They mine the leaves of their host plant.
