= Monocercops =

Scientific classification
- Kingdom: Animalia
- Phylum: Arthropoda
- Class: Insecta
- Order: Lepidoptera
- Family: Gracillariidae
- Subfamily: Acrocercopinae
- Genus: Monocercops; Kumata, 1989

Species
- See text

Genus of moths

Monocercops is a genus of moths in the family Gracillariidae.

== Etymology ==
Monocercops is derived from the Greek monos (meaning one, single), cercos (tail) and ops (eye).

== Species ==
- Monocercops actinosema (Turner, 1923)
- Monocercops nepalensis Kumata, 1989

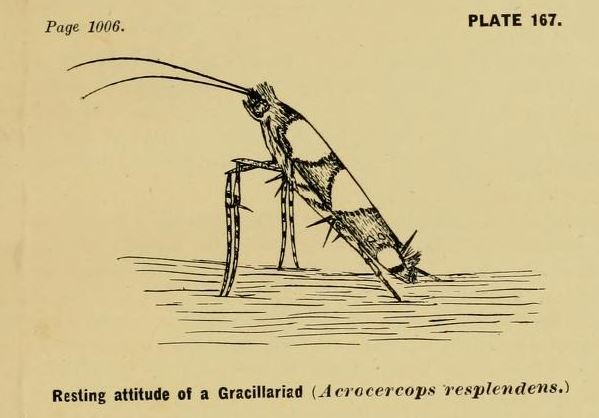
Illustration of Monocercops resplendens specie

- Monocercops resplendens (Stainton, 1862)
- Monocercops thoi Kumata, 1989
- Monocercops triangulata Kumata, 1989
