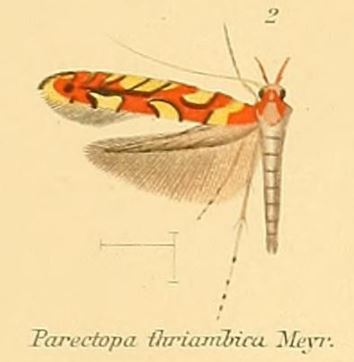
- Macarostola thriambica

Scientific classification
- Kingdom: Animalia
- Phylum: Arthropoda
- Clade: Pancrustacea
- Class: Insecta
- Order: Lepidoptera
- Family: Gracillariidae
- Subfamily: Gracillariinae
- Genus: Macarostola; Meyrick, 1907

Type species
- Macarostola formosa (Stainton, 1862)

= Macarostola =

Genus of moths

Macarostola is a genus of moths in the family Gracillariidae. The genus was erected by Edward Meyrick in 1907.

Characteristics: Characters of Gracilaria, but middle tibiae not thickened, smooth-scaled, scales sometimes expanded at apex only.

== Species ==
- Macarostola ageta (Turner, 1917)
- Macarostola callischema Meyrick, 1908
- Macarostola ceryx (Diakonoff, 1955)
- Macarostola coccinea (Walsingham, 1900)
- Macarostola eugeniella (Viette, 1951)
- Macarostola flora (Meyrick, 1926)
- Macarostola formosa (Stainton, 1862)
- Macarostola gamelia (Meyrick, 1936)
- Macarostola haemataula Meyrick, 1912
- Macarostola hieranthes (Meyrick, 1907)
- Macarostola ida (Meyrick, 1880)
- Macarostola japonica Kumata, 1977
- Macarostola miltopepla (Turner, 1926)
- Macarostola miniella (Felder & Rogenhofer, 1875)
- Macarostola noellineae Vári, 2002
- Macarostola paradisia Meyrick, 1908
- Macarostola parolca Meyrick, 1911
- Macarostola phoenicaula (Meyrick, 1934)
- Macarostola polyplaca (Lower, 1894)
- Macarostola pontificalis (Meyrick, 1928)
- Macarostola pyrelictis (Meyrick, 1927)
- Macarostola rosacea (Turner, 1940)
- Macarostola tegulata Meyrick, 1908
- Macarostola thiasodes (Meyrick, 1912)
- Macarostola thriambica (Meyrick, 1907)
- Macarostola zehntneri (Snellen, 1902)
