= Cuphodes =

Scientific classification
- Kingdom: Animalia
- Phylum: Arthropoda
- Clade: Pancrustacea
- Class: Insecta
- Order: Lepidoptera
- Family: Gracillariidae
- Subfamily: Gracillariinae
- Genus: Cuphodes; Meyrick, 1897

Species
- See text

Genus of moths

Cuphodes is a genus of moths in the family Gracillariidae.

== Species ==
- Cuphodes didymosticha Turner, 1940
- Cuphodes diospyri Vári, 1961
- Cuphodes diospyrosella (Issiki, 1957)
- Cuphodes dolichocera Vári, 1961
- Cuphodes habrophanes Turner, 1940
- Cuphodes holoteles (Turner, 1913)
- Cuphodes lechriotoma (Turner, 1913)
- Cuphodes leucocera Vári, 1961
- Cuphodes lithographa (Meyrick, 1912)
- Cuphodes maculosa Turner, 1940
- Cuphodes melanostola (Meyrick, 1918)
- Cuphodes niphadias (Turner, 1913)
- Cuphodes paragrapta (Meyrick, 1915)
- Cuphodes plexigrapha (Meyrick, 1916)
- Cuphodes profluens (Meyrick, 1916)
- Cuphodes thysanota Meyrick, 1897
- Cuphodes tridora Meyrick, 1911
- Cuphodes wisteriella Kuroko, 1982
- Cuphodes zophopasta (Turner, 1913)
