= Conopomorpha =

Scientific classification
- Kingdom: Animalia
- Phylum: Arthropoda
- Clade: Pancrustacea
- Class: Insecta
- Order: Lepidoptera
- Family: Gracillariidae
- Subfamily: Gracillariinae
- Genus: Conopomorpha; Meyrick, 1885

Species
- See text

Genus of moths

Conopomorpha is a genus of moths in the family Gracillariidae.

== Species ==
- Conopomorpha antimacha Meyrick, 1907
- Conopomorpha chionochtha Meyrick, 1907
- Conopomorpha chionosema Vári, 1961
- Conopomorpha cramerella (Snellen, 1904)
- Conopomorpha cyanospila Meyrick, 1885
- Conopomorpha euphanes Vári, 1961
- Conopomorpha flueggella Li, 2011
- Conopomorpha fustigera (Meyrick, 1928)
- Conopomorpha habrodes Meyrick, 1907
- Conopomorpha heliopla Meyrick, 1907
- Conopomorpha litchiella Bradley, 1986
- Conopomorpha oceanica Bradley, 1986
- Conopomorpha sinensis Bradley, 1986
- Conopomorpha zaplaca Meyrick, 1907
