= Macarostola japonica =

Scientific classification
- Kingdom: Animalia
- Phylum: Arthropoda
- Class: Insecta
- Order: Lepidoptera
- Family: Gracillariidae
- Genus: Macarostola
- Species: M. japonica

Binomial name
- Macarostola japonica Kumata, 1977

Species of moth

Macarostola japonica is a species of moth of the family Gracillariidae. It is native to Japan (Honshū and Satunan).

The wingspan is 9–10 mm.

The larvae feed on Staphylea japonica.
