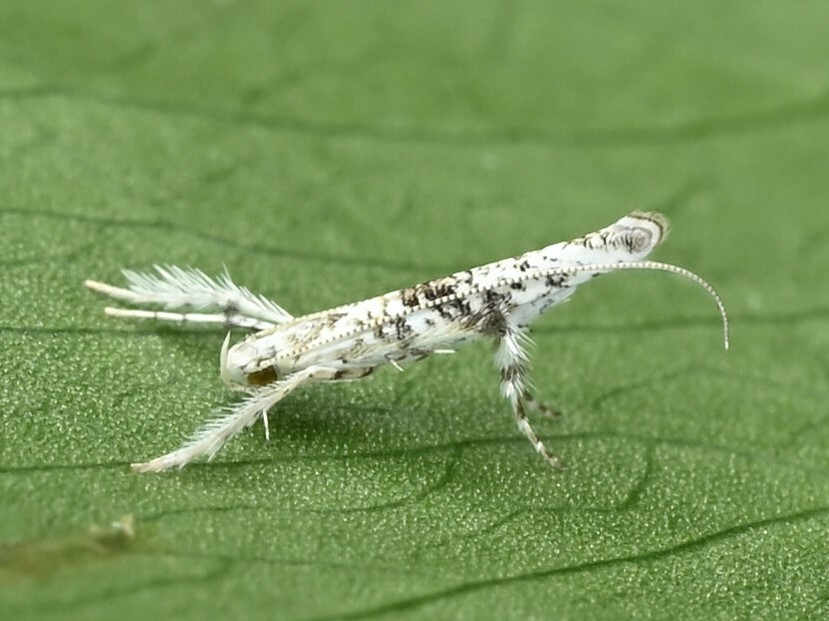

Scientific classification
- Kingdom: Animalia
- Phylum: Arthropoda
- Class: Insecta
- Order: Lepidoptera
- Family: Gracillariidae
- Genus: Cuphodes
- Species: C. wisteriella

Binomial name
- Cuphodes wisteriella Kuroko, 1982

= Cuphodes wisteriella =

Species of moth

Cuphodes wisteriella is a species of moth in the family Gracillariidae. It is known from Japan.

The wingspan is 8–9 mm.
