= Macarostola callischema =

Scientific classification
- Kingdom: Animalia
- Phylum: Arthropoda
- Class: Insecta
- Order: Lepidoptera
- Family: Gracillariidae
- Genus: Macarostola
- Species: M. callischema

Binomial name
- Macarostola callischema Meyrick, 1908

Species of moth

Macarostola callischema is a moth of the family Gracillariidae. It is known from Meghalaya, India.
