= Cyphosticha pterocola =

Scientific classification
- Kingdom: Animalia
- Phylum: Arthropoda
- Class: Insecta
- Order: Lepidoptera
- Family: Gracillariidae
- Genus: Cyphosticha
- Species: C. pterocola

Binomial name
- Cyphosticha pterocola Meyrick, 1914

Species of moth

Cyphosticha pterocola is a moth of the family Gracillariidae. It is known from Karnataka, India.
