= Conopomorpha litchiella =

Scientific classification
- Domain: Eukaryota
- Kingdom: Animalia
- Phylum: Arthropoda
- Class: Insecta
- Order: Lepidoptera
- Family: Gracillariidae
- Genus: Conopomorpha
- Species: C. litchiella

Binomial name
- Conopomorpha litchiella Bradley, 1986

Species of moth

Conopomorpha litchiella is a moth of the family Gracillariidae. It is known from Australia, China (Fujian), India (Bihar, Uttar Pradesh, Karnataka and West Bengal), Malaysia (Selangor), Nepal, Taiwan and Thailand.

The larvae feed on Senna obtusifolia, Senna tora, Eugenia cumini, Dimocarpus longan, Litchi chinensis, Nephelium litchi and Theobroma cacao. They mine the leaves as well as the fruit of their host plant.
