= Aristaea atrata =

Scientific classification
- Kingdom: Animalia
- Phylum: Arthropoda
- Clade: Pancrustacea
- Class: Insecta
- Order: Lepidoptera
- Family: Gracillariidae
- Genus: Aristaea
- Species: A. atrata

Binomial name
- Aristaea atrata Triberti, 1985

Species of moth

Aristaea atrata is a moth of the family Gracillariidae. It is known from Madagascar.

The larvae feed on Rubiaceae species. They probably mine the leaves of their host plant.
