= Metacercops praestricta =

Scientific classification
- Kingdom: Animalia
- Phylum: Arthropoda
- Class: Insecta
- Order: Lepidoptera
- Family: Gracillariidae
- Genus: Metacercops
- Species: M. praestricta

Binomial name
- Metacercops praestricta (Meyrick, 1918)

Synonyms
- Parectopa praestricta Meyrick, 1918

Species of moth

Metacercops praestricta is a moth of the family Gracillariidae. It is known from South Africa.
