= Conopomorpha oceanica =

Scientific classification
- Domain: Eukaryota
- Kingdom: Animalia
- Phylum: Arthropoda
- Class: Insecta
- Order: Lepidoptera
- Family: Gracillariidae
- Genus: Conopomorpha
- Species: C. oceanica

Binomial name
- Conopomorpha oceanica Bradley, 1986

Species of moth

Conopomorpha oceanica is a moth of the family Gracillariidae. It is known from Fiji and Vanuatu.

The larvae feed on Theobroma cacao. They probably mine the leaves as well as the fruit or seeds of their host plant.
