= Aristaea issikii =

Scientific classification
- Kingdom: Animalia
- Phylum: Arthropoda
- Class: Insecta
- Order: Lepidoptera
- Family: Gracillariidae
- Genus: Aristaea
- Species: A. issikii

Binomial name
- Aristaea issikii Kumata, 1977

Species of moth

Aristaea issikii is a species of moth of the family Gracillariidae. It is known from Honshū, Japan.

The wingspan is 8.2–10.5 mm.

The larvae feed on Aster ageratoides. They mine the leaves of their host plant.
