= Cuphodes tridora =

Scientific classification
- Kingdom: Animalia
- Phylum: Arthropoda
- Class: Insecta
- Order: Lepidoptera
- Family: Gracillariidae
- Genus: Cuphodes
- Species: C. tridora

Binomial name
- Cuphodes tridora Meyrick, 1911

Species of moth

Cuphodes tridora is a moth of the family Gracillariidae. It is known from the Seychelles.
