= Macarostola gamelia =

Scientific classification
- Kingdom: Animalia
- Phylum: Arthropoda
- Clade: Pancrustacea
- Class: Insecta
- Order: Lepidoptera
- Family: Gracillariidae
- Genus: Macarostola
- Species: M. gamelia

Binomial name
- Macarostola gamelia (Meyrick, 1936)

Species of moth

Macarostola gamelia is a moth of the family Gracillariidae. It is known from Java, Indonesia.

The larvae feed on Eugenia polyantha.
