= Macarostola flora =

Scientific classification
- Kingdom: Animalia
- Phylum: Arthropoda
- Class: Insecta
- Order: Lepidoptera
- Family: Gracillariidae
- Genus: Macarostola
- Species: M. flora

Binomial name
- Macarostola flora (Meyrick, 1926)

Synonyms
- Parectopa flora Meyrick, 1926

Species of moth

Macarostola flora is a moth of the family Gracillariidae. It is known from South Africa.
