= Macarostola noellineae =

Scientific classification
- Kingdom: Animalia
- Phylum: Arthropoda
- Class: Insecta
- Order: Lepidoptera
- Family: Gracillariidae
- Genus: Macarostola
- Species: M. noellineae

Binomial name
- Macarostola noellineae Vári, 2002

Species of moth

Macarostola noellineae is a moth of the family Gracillariidae. It is known from South Africa.
