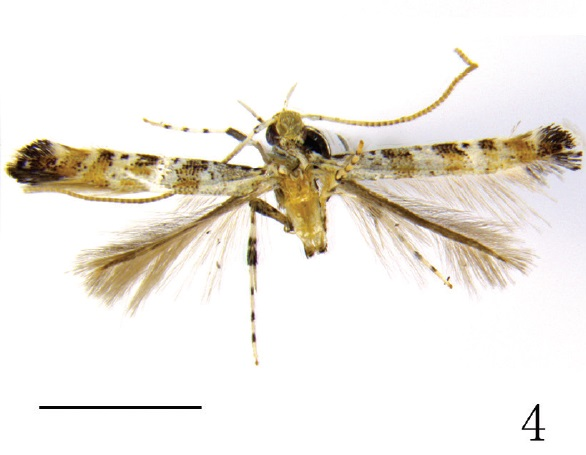

Scientific classification
- Kingdom: Animalia
- Phylum: Arthropoda
- Class: Insecta
- Order: Lepidoptera
- Family: Gracillariidae
- Genus: Gibbovalva
- Species: G. clavata

Binomial name
- Gibbovalva clavata Bai, 2016

= Gibbovalva clavata =

Species of moth

Gibbovalva clavata is a moth of the family Gracillariidae. It is found in Jiangxi, China.

The wingspan is about 7 mm. The basal one-third of the forewings is white, with four black specks along the costa, of which the last one is smallest. The distal two-thirds of the forewings is ochreous yellow with a fuscous band along the costa and four white, nearly equally spaced fasciae which obliquely extend outwards from the costa to the dorsum. Two basal fasciae, approximately twice the width of the two distal ones, enclose a black spot on the costa. The hindwings are pale grey.

== Etymology ==
The specific name is derived from Latin clavatus (meaning clavate) and refers to the costal process of valva.
