= Macarostola hieranthes =

Scientific classification
- Kingdom: Animalia
- Phylum: Arthropoda
- Class: Insecta
- Order: Lepidoptera
- Family: Gracillariidae
- Genus: Macarostola
- Species: M. hieranthes

Binomial name
- Macarostola hieranthes (Meyrick, 1907)

Synonyms
- Coriscium hieranthes Meyrick, 1907

Species of moth

Macarostola hieranthes is a moth of the family Gracillariidae. It is known from Sri Lanka.

The head of this species is white, the crown yellowish-tinged, collar pale crimson. Palpi pale crimson, terminal joint of labial yellowish-white. Antennae white ochreous, basal joint yellowish-white. Thorax crimson, posterior third white, abdomen grey. Legs yellowish ringed with dark grey. Forewings crimson, markings pale yellow finally edged with blackish; a dot on costa near base.
