= Acrocercops calicella =

Scientific classification
- Kingdom: Animalia
- Phylum: Arthropoda
- Clade: Pancrustacea
- Class: Insecta
- Order: Lepidoptera
- Family: Gracillariidae
- Genus: Acrocercops
- Species: A. calicella

Binomial name
- Acrocercops calicella (Stainton, 1862)

Synonyms
- Gracilaria calicella Stainton, 1862

Species of insect

Acrocercops calicella is a moth of the family Gracillariidae. It is known from Australia in the Northern Territory, the southern half of Queensland and New South Wales.

The larvae feed on Eucalyptus species, including Eucalyptus gummifera, Eucalyptus major, Eucalyptus resinifer, Eucalyptus robustus, Eucalyptus salignus and Eucalyptus triantha. They mine the leaves of their host plant.
