= Cuphodes diospyrosella =

Scientific classification
- Kingdom: Animalia
- Phylum: Arthropoda
- Clade: Pancrustacea
- Class: Insecta
- Order: Lepidoptera
- Family: Gracillariidae
- Genus: Cuphodes
- Species: C. diospyrosella

Binomial name
- Cuphodes diospyrosella (Issiki, 1957)

Species of moth

Cuphodes diospyrosella is a moth of the family Gracillariidae. It is known from Japan. The wingspan is 7.0–8.5 mm. Leaf miners, the diospyrosella larvae feed on the mesophyll of the Diospyros species.
