= Phyllonorycter enchalcoa =

Scientific classification
- Domain: Eukaryota
- Kingdom: Animalia
- Phylum: Arthropoda
- Class: Insecta
- Order: Lepidoptera
- Family: Gracillariidae
- Genus: Phyllonorycter
- Species: P. enchalcoa

Binomial name
- Phyllonorycter enchalcoa (Turner, 1939)

Synonyms
- Phyllocnistis enchalcoa Turner, 1939; Phyllonorycter enchalca (Turner, 1940)

Species of moth

Phyllonorycter enchalcoa is a moth of the family Gracillariidae. It is known from Tasmania.

The larvae feed on Plagianthus sidoides. They probably mine the leaves of their host plant.
