= Phyllonorycter lalagella =

Scientific classification
- Kingdom: Animalia
- Phylum: Arthropoda
- Clade: Pancrustacea
- Class: Insecta
- Order: Lepidoptera
- Family: Gracillariidae
- Genus: Phyllonorycter
- Species: P. lalagella

Binomial name
- Phyllonorycter lalagella (Newman, 1856)

Synonyms
- Lithocolletis lalagella Newman, 1856

Species of moth

Phyllonorycter lalagella is a moth of the family Gracillariidae. It is known from Australia.
