= Cyphosticha dialeuca =

Scientific classification
- Kingdom: Animalia
- Phylum: Arthropoda
- Class: Insecta
- Order: Lepidoptera
- Family: Gracillariidae
- Genus: Cyphosticha
- Species: C. dialeuca

Binomial name
- Cyphosticha dialeuca Turner, 1940

Species of moth

Cyphosticha dialeuca is a moth of the family Gracillariidae. It is known from Queensland, Australia.
