= Aristaea thalassias =

Scientific classification
- Kingdom: Animalia
- Phylum: Arthropoda
- Class: Insecta
- Order: Lepidoptera
- Family: Gracillariidae
- Genus: Aristaea
- Species: A. thalassias

Binomial name
- Aristaea thalassias (Meyrick, 1880)

Synonyms
- Gracilaria thalassias Meyrick, 1880

Species of moth

Aristaea thalassias is a moth of the family Gracillariidae. It is known in Australia from the states of New South Wales, Victoria and Queensland and has been introduced to South Africa for the biological control of Australian myrtle.

The larvae feed on Agonis flexuosa and Leptospermum laevigatum. They probably mine the leaves of their host plant.
