= Epicephala nephelodes =

Scientific classification
- Domain: Eukaryota
- Kingdom: Animalia
- Phylum: Arthropoda
- Class: Insecta
- Order: Lepidoptera
- Family: Gracillariidae
- Genus: Epicephala
- Species: E. nephelodes

Binomial name
- Epicephala nephelodes Turner, 1913

Synonyms
- Epicephala stephanephora Turner, 1923; Epicephala stephanophora Turner, 1940

Species of moth

Epicephala nephelodes is a moth of the family Gracillariidae. It is known from Queensland, Australia.
