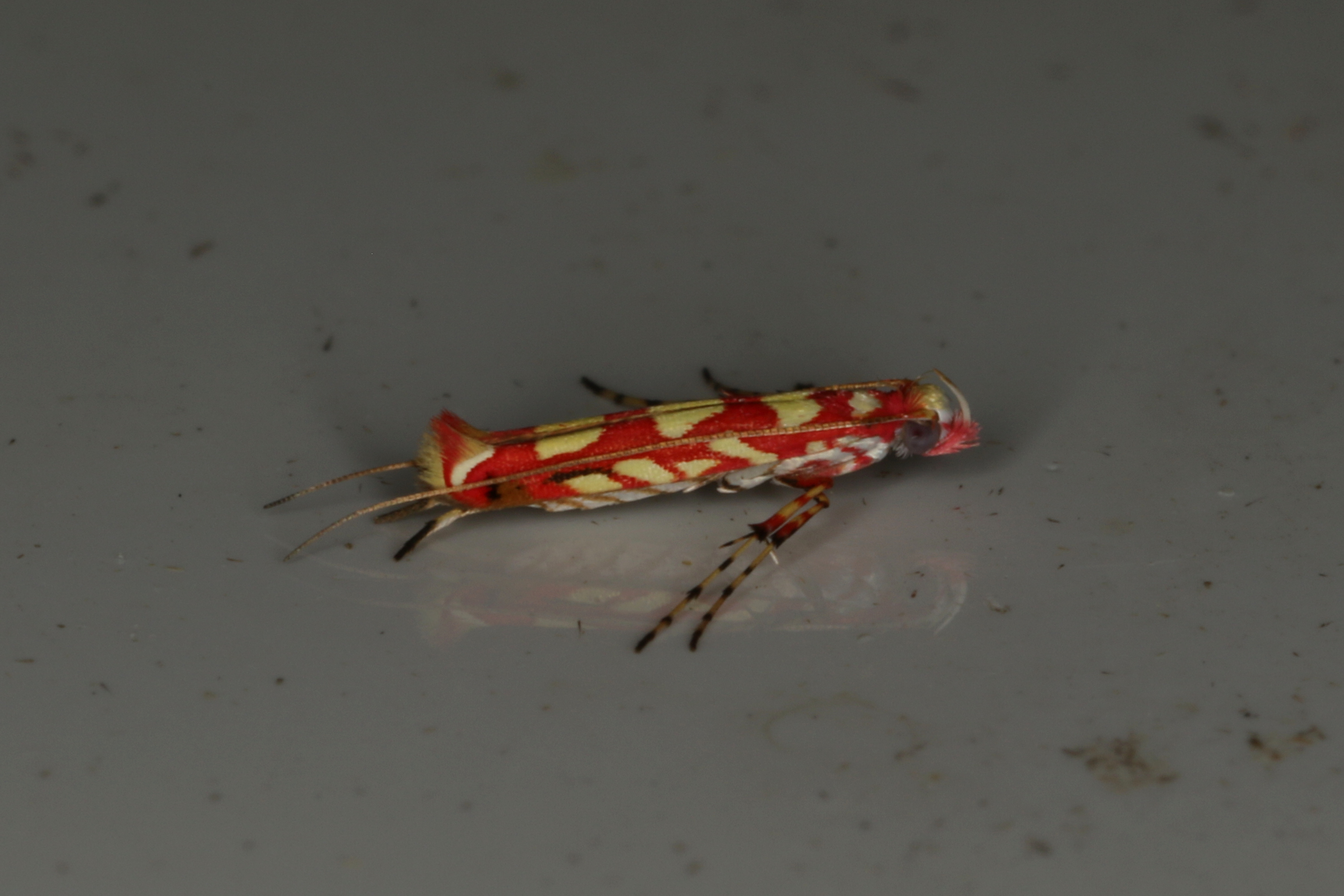
- Palm Cove, Queensland, January 2016

Scientific classification
- Domain: Eukaryota
- Kingdom: Animalia
- Phylum: Arthropoda
- Class: Insecta
- Order: Lepidoptera
- Family: Gracillariidae
- Genus: Macarostola
- Species: M. ageta

Binomial name
- Macarostola ageta (Turner, 1917)

Synonyms
- Parectopa ageta Turner, 1917

= Macarostola ageta =

Species of moth

Macarostola ageta is a moth of the family Gracillariidae. It is known from Queensland, Australia.
