= Conopomorpha antimacha =

Scientific classification
- Kingdom: Animalia
- Phylum: Arthropoda
- Class: Insecta
- Order: Lepidoptera
- Family: Gracillariidae
- Genus: Conopomorpha
- Species: C. antimacha

Binomial name
- Conopomorpha antimacha Meyrick, 1907

Species of moth

Conopomorpha antimacha is a moth of the family Gracillariidae. It is known from Western Australia.
