= Acrocercops plebeia =

Scientific classification
- Kingdom: Animalia
- Phylum: Arthropoda
- Class: Insecta
- Order: Lepidoptera
- Family: Gracillariidae
- Genus: Acrocercops
- Species: A. plebeia

Binomial name
- Acrocercops plebeia (Turner, 1894)

Synonyms
- Gracilaria plebeia Turner, 1894

Species of moth

Acrocercops plebeia is a moth of the family Gracillariidae. It is known from Queensland, Victoria and New South Wales, Australia.

The larvae feed on Acacia implexa, Acacia podalyriifolia, Acacia prominens and Acacia rubida. They mine the leaves of their host plant. The mine consists of a large blotch mine.
