= Cuphodes zophopasta =

Scientific classification
- Domain: Eukaryota
- Kingdom: Animalia
- Phylum: Arthropoda
- Class: Insecta
- Order: Lepidoptera
- Family: Gracillariidae
- Genus: Cuphodes
- Species: C. zophopasta

Binomial name
- Cuphodes zophopasta (Turner, 1913)

Synonyms
- Phrixosceles zophopasta Turner, 1913

Species of moth

Cuphodes zophopasta is a moth of the family Gracillariidae. It is known from Queensland, Australia.
