= Metacercops cuphomorpha =

Scientific classification
- Domain: Eukaryota
- Kingdom: Animalia
- Phylum: Arthropoda
- Class: Insecta
- Order: Lepidoptera
- Family: Gracillariidae
- Genus: Metacercops
- Species: M. cuphomorpha

Binomial name
- Metacercops cuphomorpha (Turner, 1940)

Synonyms
- Parectopa cuphomorpha Turner, 1940

Species of moth

Metacercops cuphomorpha is a moth of the family Gracillariidae. It is known from Queensland, Australia.
