= Monocercops actinosema =

Scientific classification
- Kingdom: Animalia
- Phylum: Arthropoda
- Clade: Pancrustacea
- Class: Insecta
- Order: Lepidoptera
- Family: Gracillariidae
- Genus: Monocercops
- Species: M. actinosema

Binomial name
- Monocercops actinosema (Turner, 1923)

Synonyms
- Parectopa actinosema Turner, 1923

Species of moth

Monocercops actinosema is a moth of the family Gracillariidae. It is known from Queensland, Australia.
