= Cyphosticha pyrochroma =

Scientific classification
- Kingdom: Animalia
- Phylum: Arthropoda
- Class: Insecta
- Order: Lepidoptera
- Family: Gracillariidae
- Genus: Cyphosticha
- Species: C. pyrochroma

Binomial name
- Cyphosticha pyrochroma (Turner, 1894)

Synonyms
- Gracilaria pyrochroma Turner, 1894

Species of moth

Cyphosticha pyrochroma is a moth of the family Gracillariidae. It is known from Queensland and New South Wales, Australia.
