= Cuphodes thysanota =

Scientific classification
- Kingdom: Animalia
- Phylum: Arthropoda
- Class: Insecta
- Order: Lepidoptera
- Family: Gracillariidae
- Genus: Cuphodes
- Species: C. thysanota

Binomial name
- Cuphodes thysanota Meyrick, 1897

Species of moth

Cuphodes thysanota is a moth of the family Gracillariidae. It is known from Queensland, Australia.
