= Aristaea amalopa =

Scientific classification
- Kingdom: Animalia
- Phylum: Arthropoda
- Class: Insecta
- Order: Lepidoptera
- Family: Gracillariidae
- Genus: Aristaea
- Species: A. amalopa

Binomial name
- Aristaea amalopa (Meyrick, 1907)

Synonyms
- Macarostola amalopa Meyrick, 1907

Species of moth

Aristaea amalopa is a moth of the family Gracillariidae. It is known from Western Australia.
