= Cyphosticha microta =

Scientific classification
- Kingdom: Animalia
- Phylum: Arthropoda
- Class: Insecta
- Order: Lepidoptera
- Family: Gracillariidae
- Genus: Cyphosticha
- Species: C. microta

Binomial name
- Cyphosticha microta (Turner, 1894)

Synonyms
- Gracilaria microta Turner, 1894

Species of moth

Cyphosticha microta is a moth of the family Gracillariidae. It is known from Queensland, Australia.
