= Cyphosticha pandoxa =

Scientific classification
- Kingdom: Animalia
- Phylum: Arthropoda
- Class: Insecta
- Order: Lepidoptera
- Family: Gracillariidae
- Genus: Cyphosticha
- Species: C. pandoxa

Binomial name
- Cyphosticha pandoxa Turner, 1913

Species of moth

Cyphosticha pandoxa is a moth of the family Gracillariidae. It is known from Queensland, Australia.
