= Aristaea machaerophora =

Scientific classification
- Kingdom: Animalia
- Phylum: Arthropoda
- Clade: Pancrustacea
- Class: Insecta
- Order: Lepidoptera
- Family: Gracillariidae
- Genus: Aristaea
- Species: A. machaerophora

Binomial name
- Aristaea machaerophora (Turner, 1940)

Synonyms
- Parectopa machaerophora Turner, 1940

Species of moth

Aristaea machaerophora is a moth of the family Gracillariidae. It is known from Queensland, Australia.
