= Gibbovalva tricuneatella =

Scientific classification
- Kingdom: Animalia
- Phylum: Arthropoda
- Clade: Pancrustacea
- Class: Insecta
- Order: Lepidoptera
- Family: Gracillariidae
- Genus: Gibbovalva
- Species: G. tricuneatella

Binomial name
- Gibbovalva tricuneatella (Meyrick, 1880)

Synonyms
- Acrocercops tricuneatella (Meyrick, 1880); Gracilaria tricuneatella Meyrick, 1880

Species of moth

Gibbovalva tricuneatella is a moth of the family Gracillariidae. It is known from the states of New South Wales and Queensland in Australia and the Ryukyu Islands of Japan.

The larvae feed on Typha angustifolia, Typha domingensis and Typha latifolia. They mine the leaves of their host plant.
