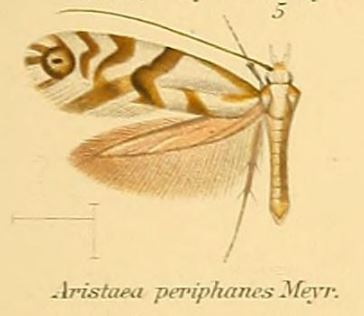

Scientific classification
- Kingdom: Animalia
- Phylum: Arthropoda
- Class: Insecta
- Order: Lepidoptera
- Family: Gracillariidae
- Genus: Aristaea
- Species: A. periphanes

Binomial name
- Aristaea periphanes Meyrick, 1907

= Aristaea periphanes =

Species of moth

Aristaea periphanes is a moth of the family Gracillariidae. It is known from Tasmania, Australia.
