= Caloptilia octopunctata =

Scientific classification
- Kingdom: Animalia
- Phylum: Arthropoda
- Class: Insecta
- Order: Lepidoptera
- Family: Gracillariidae
- Genus: Caloptilia
- Species: C. octopunctata

Binomial name
- Caloptilia octopunctata (Turner, 1894)

Synonyms
- Gracilaria octopunctata Turner, 1894; Gracilaria tetratypa Meyrick, 1928; Gracilaria cirrhocrotala Meyrick, 1928

Species of moth

Caloptilia octopunctata is a species of moth of the family Gracillariidae. It is known from the Democratic Republic of Congo, Tanzania, Uganda, South Africa, India, Australia (New South Wales and Queensland), New Zealand and Indonesia.

The wingspan is 9–13 mm.

The larvae feed on Homalanthus species, Omalanthus populifolius, Sapium ellipticum, Sapium indicum and Sapium sebiferum. They mine the leaves of their host plant.
