= Cyphosticha albomarginata =

Scientific classification
- Kingdom: Animalia
- Phylum: Arthropoda
- Clade: Pancrustacea
- Class: Insecta
- Order: Lepidoptera
- Family: Gracillariidae
- Genus: Cyphosticha
- Species: C. albomarginata

Binomial name
- Cyphosticha albomarginata (Stainton, 1862)

Synonyms
- Gracilaria albomarginata Stainton, 1862

Species of moth

Cyphosticha albomarginata is a moth of the family Gracillariidae. It is known from the Northern Territory and Queensland of Australia.
