= Cuphodes profluens =

Scientific classification
- Kingdom: Animalia
- Phylum: Arthropoda
- Class: Insecta
- Order: Lepidoptera
- Family: Gracillariidae
- Genus: Cuphodes
- Species: C. profluens

Binomial name
- Cuphodes profluens (Meyrick, 1916)

Synonyms
- Phrixosceles profluens Meyrick, 1916

Species of moth

Cuphodes profluens is a moth of the family Gracillariidae. It is known from Australia, India (Bihar) and Pakistan.

The larvae feed on Acacia nilotica. They probably mine the leaves of their host plant.
