= Acrocercops laciniella =

Blackbutt leafminer

Scientific classification
- Kingdom: Animalia
- Phylum: Arthropoda
- Clade: Pancrustacea
- Class: Insecta
- Order: Lepidoptera
- Family: Gracillariidae
- Genus: Acrocercops
- Species: A. laciniella

Binomial name
- Acrocercops laciniella (Meyrick, 1880)

Synonyms
- Gracilaria laciniella Meyrick, 1880

Species of moth

Acrocercops laciniella (blackbutt leafminer) is a moth of the family Gracillariidae. In Australia, it is known from the states of New South Wales, Queensland, Victoria, South Australia and Tasmania. It is also known from India and was found in New Zealand in 1999, establishing itself in the Waikato and Bay of Plenty regions by February 2001 through Eucalyptus nitens plantations.
