= Conopomorpha chionochtha =

Scientific classification
- Kingdom: Animalia
- Phylum: Arthropoda
- Class: Insecta
- Order: Lepidoptera
- Family: Gracillariidae
- Genus: Conopomorpha
- Species: C. chionochtha

Binomial name
- Conopomorpha chionochtha Meyrick, 1907

Species of moth

Conopomorpha chionochtha is a moth of the family Gracillariidae. It is known from South Australia.
