= Macarostola miltopepla =

Scientific classification
- Domain: Eukaryota
- Kingdom: Animalia
- Phylum: Arthropoda
- Class: Insecta
- Order: Lepidoptera
- Family: Gracillariidae
- Genus: Macarostola
- Species: M. miltopepla

Binomial name
- Macarostola miltopepla (Turner, 1926)

Synonyms
- Parectopa miltopepla Turner, 1926

Species of moth

Macarostola miltopepla is a moth of the family Gracillariidae. It is known from Queensland, Australia.
