= Cuphodes maculosa =

Scientific classification
- Domain: Eukaryota
- Kingdom: Animalia
- Phylum: Arthropoda
- Class: Insecta
- Order: Lepidoptera
- Family: Gracillariidae
- Genus: Cuphodes
- Species: C. maculosa

Binomial name
- Cuphodes maculosa Turner, 1940

Species of moth

Cuphodes maculosa is a moth of the family Gracillariidae. It is known from Queensland, Australia.
