= Cuphodes lithographa =

Scientific classification
- Kingdom: Animalia
- Phylum: Arthropoda
- Class: Insecta
- Order: Lepidoptera
- Family: Gracillariidae
- Genus: Cuphodes
- Species: C. lithographa

Binomial name
- Cuphodes lithographa (Meyrick, 1912)

Synonyms
- Phrixosceles lithographa Meyrick, 1912

Species of moth

Cuphodes lithographa is a moth of the family Gracillariidae. It is known from Queensland, Australia. It was described by Edward Meyrick in 1912.
