= Aristaea acares =

Scientific classification
- Domain: Eukaryota
- Kingdom: Animalia
- Phylum: Arthropoda
- Class: Insecta
- Order: Lepidoptera
- Family: Gracillariidae
- Genus: Aristaea
- Species: A. acares

Binomial name
- Aristaea acares (Turner, 1939)

Synonyms
- Lithocolletis acares Turner, 1939

Species of moth

Aristaea acares is a moth of the family Gracillariidae. It is known from Tasmania, Australia.
