= Caloptilia leucolitha =

Scientific classification
- Domain: Eukaryota
- Kingdom: Animalia
- Phylum: Arthropoda
- Class: Insecta
- Order: Lepidoptera
- Family: Gracillariidae
- Genus: Caloptilia
- Species: C. leucolitha

Binomial name
- Caloptilia leucolitha (Meyrick, 1912)

Synonyms
- Gracilaria leucolitha Meyrick, 1912

Species of moth

Caloptilia leucolitha is a moth of the family Gracillariidae. It is known from the Northern Territory of Australia, Indonesia (Bali, Java), India, and Sri Lanka.

The larvae feed on Litsea chinensis and Litsea glutinosa. They probably mine the leaves of their host plant.
