= Cyphosticha callimacha =

Scientific classification
- Kingdom: Animalia
- Phylum: Arthropoda
- Class: Insecta
- Order: Lepidoptera
- Family: Gracillariidae
- Genus: Cyphosticha
- Species: C. callimacha

Binomial name
- Cyphosticha callimacha (Meyrick, 1920)

Synonyms
- Acrocercops callimacha Meyrick, 1920

Species of moth

Cyphosticha callimacha is a moth of the family Gracillariidae. It is known from Queensland, Australia.
