= Phyllonorycter stephanota =

Scientific classification
- Kingdom: Animalia
- Phylum: Arthropoda
- Class: Insecta
- Order: Lepidoptera
- Family: Gracillariidae
- Genus: Phyllonorycter
- Species: P. stephanota

Binomial name
- Phyllonorycter stephanota (Meyrick, 1907)

Synonyms
- Lithocolletis stephanota Meyrick, 1907

Species of moth

Phyllonorycter stephanota is a moth of the family Gracillariidae. It is known from New South Wales and Queensland in Australia.

The larvae feed on Abutilon, Hibiscus, Malvastrum (including Malvastrum spicatum) and Sida species (including Sida subspicata). They probably mine the leaves of their host plant.
