= Cyphosticha panconita =

Scientific classification
- Kingdom: Animalia
- Phylum: Arthropoda
- Class: Insecta
- Order: Lepidoptera
- Family: Gracillariidae
- Genus: Cyphosticha
- Species: C. panconita

Binomial name
- Cyphosticha panconita Turner, 1913

Species of moth

Cyphosticha panconita is a moth of the family Gracillariidae. It is known from Queensland and New South Wales, Australia.
