= Macarostola polyplaca =

Scientific classification
- Kingdom: Animalia
- Phylum: Arthropoda
- Class: Insecta
- Order: Lepidoptera
- Family: Gracillariidae
- Genus: Macarostola
- Species: M. polyplaca

Binomial name
- Macarostola polyplaca (Lower, 1894)

Synonyms
- Gracilaria polyplaca Lower, 1894

Species of moth

Macarostola polyplaca is a moth of the family Gracillariidae. It is found in Queensland and New South Wales, Australia.

The larvae feed on Lophostemon confertus and Tristania suaveolens. They probably mine the leaves of their host plant.
