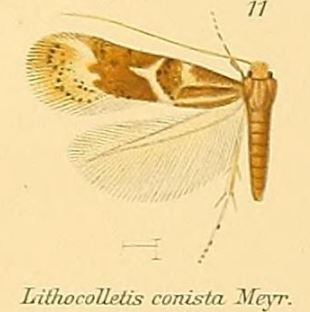

Scientific classification
- Kingdom: Animalia
- Phylum: Arthropoda
- Class: Insecta
- Order: Lepidoptera
- Family: Gracillariidae
- Genus: Phyllonorycter
- Species: P. conista

Binomial name
- Phyllonorycter conista (Meyrick, 1911)

Synonyms
- Lithocolletis conista Meyrick, 1911; Lithocolletis clarisona Meyrick, 1916; Phyllonorycter clarisona (Meyrick, 1916)

= Phyllonorycter conista =

Species of moth

Phyllonorycter conista is a moth of the family Gracillariidae. It is known from India (Bihar), Malaysia (Pahang), Nepal, the Philippines (Luzon and Palawan) and Sri Lanka.

The wingspan is 4.7–5.3 mm (0.19–0.21 in).

The larvae feed on Urena lobata. They mine the leaves of their host plant.
