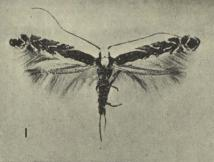

Scientific classification
- Kingdom: Animalia
- Phylum: Arthropoda
- Clade: Pancrustacea
- Class: Insecta
- Order: Lepidoptera
- Family: Gracillariidae
- Genus: Acrocercops
- Species: A. alysidota

Binomial name
- Acrocercops alysidota (Meyrick, 1880)

Synonyms
- Gracilaria alysidota Meyrick, 1880; Acrocercops citharoda (Meyrick, 1916); Parectopa citharoda

= Acrocercops alysidota =

Wattle miner

Species of moth

Acrocercops alysidota (wattle miner) is a moth of the family Gracillariidae. It is known from New South Wales, Queensland, Victoria, Southern Australia and Western Australia as well as New Zealand.

mine

The larvae feed on Acacia longifolia, Acacia melanoxylon, Acacia pycnantha and Acacia saligna. They mine the leaves of their host plant.
