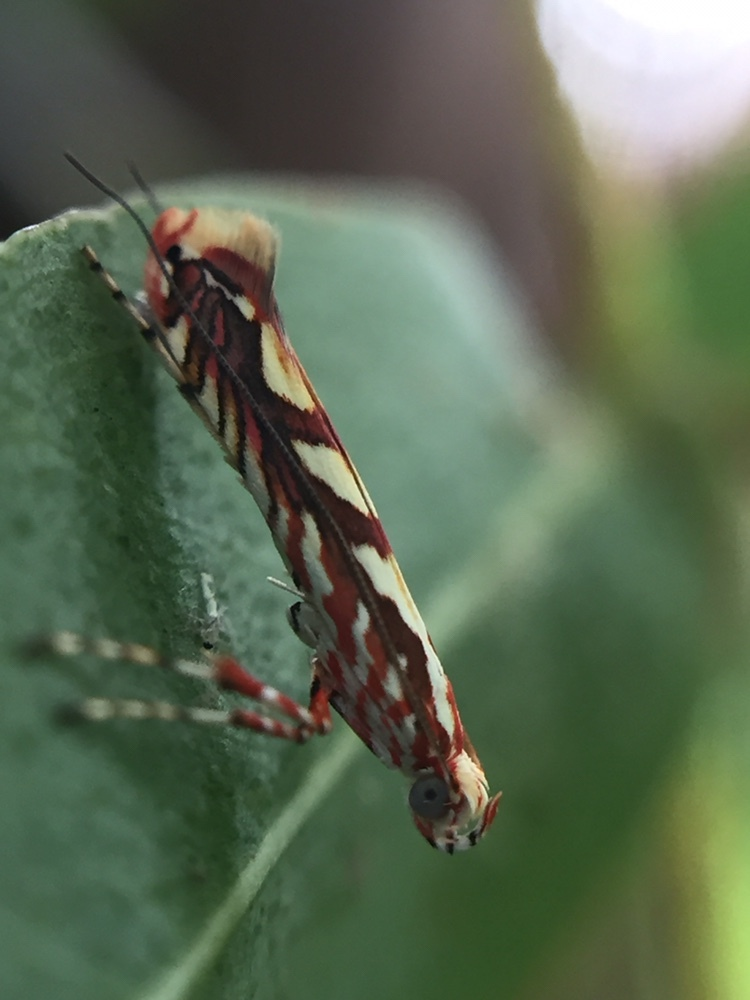
- Macarostola ida seen in Auckland, New Zealand

Scientific classification
- Kingdom: Animalia
- Phylum: Arthropoda
- Class: Insecta
- Order: Lepidoptera
- Family: Gracillariidae
- Genus: Macarostola
- Species: M. ida

Binomial name
- Macarostola ida (Meyrick, 1880)

Synonyms
- Gracilaria ida Meyrick, 1880; Macarostola rosea (Turner, 1894)

= Macarostola ida =

Species of moth

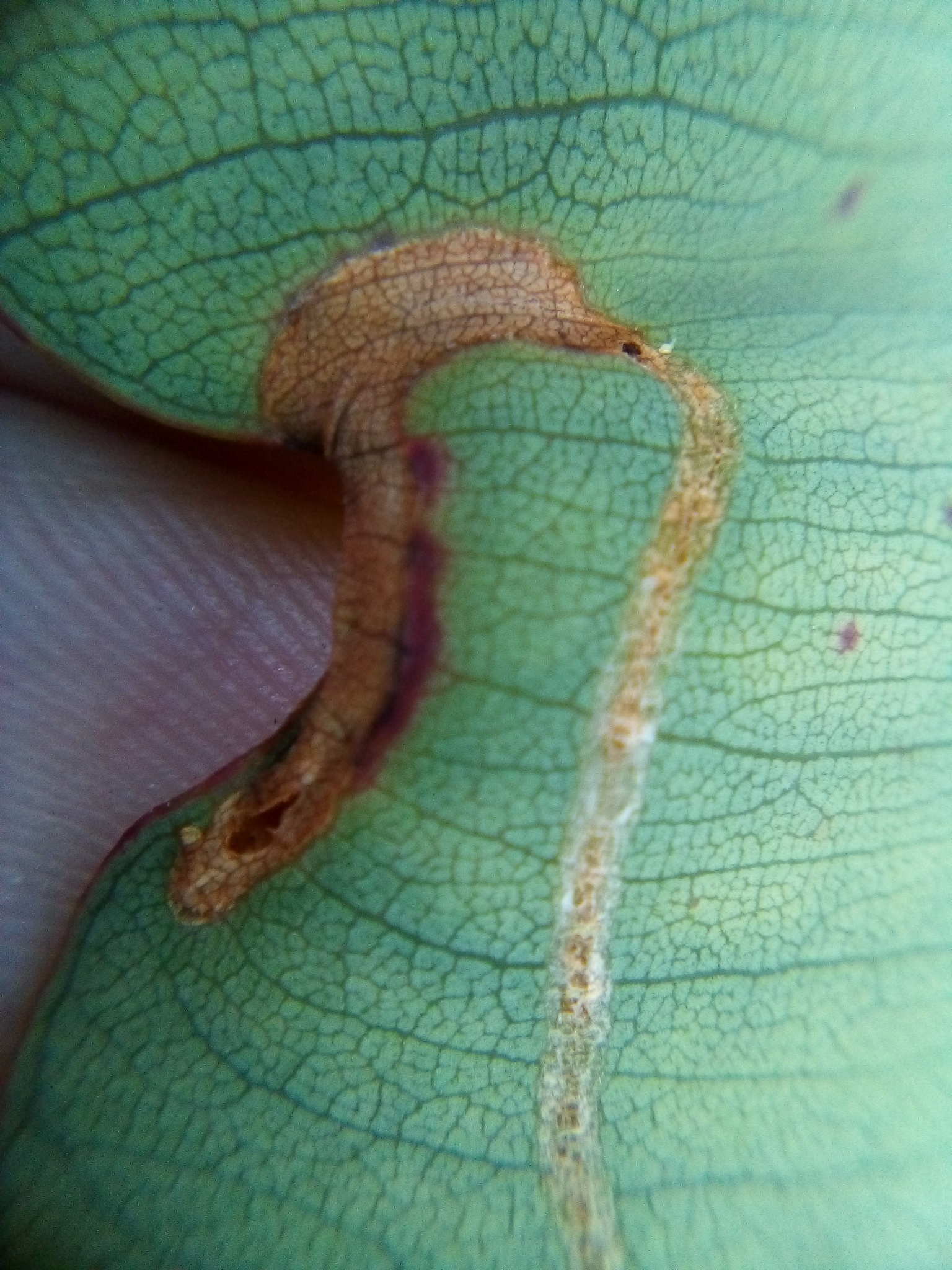
Leaf mines on Eucalyptus leaves caused by Macarostola ida

Macarostola ida is a moth of the family Gracillariidae. It is known from Australia in the states of New South Wales, Queensland, Western Australia and Victoria. In 2019 it was discovered to have become established in Northland and east Auckland in New Zealand.

The larvae feed on Angophora and Eucalyptus species, including Eucalyptus piperita. They mine the leaves of their host plant.
