= Cuphodes lechriotoma =

Scientific classification
- Kingdom: Animalia
- Phylum: Arthropoda
- Class: Insecta
- Order: Lepidoptera
- Family: Gracillariidae
- Genus: Cuphodes
- Species: C. lechriotoma

Binomial name
- Cuphodes lechriotoma (Turner, 1913)

Synonyms
- Phrixosceles lechriotoma Turner, 1913

Species of moth

Cuphodes lechriotoma is a moth of the family Gracillariidae. It is known from Queensland, Australia.
