= Macarostola rosacea =

Scientific classification
- Domain: Eukaryota
- Kingdom: Animalia
- Phylum: Arthropoda
- Class: Insecta
- Order: Lepidoptera
- Family: Gracillariidae
- Genus: Macarostola
- Species: M. rosacea

Binomial name
- Macarostola rosacea (Turner, 1940)

Synonyms
- Parectopa rosacea Turner, 1940

Species of moth

Macarostola rosacea is a moth of the family Gracillariidae. It is known from New South Wales, Australia.
