= Acrocercops macaria =

Scientific classification
- Domain: Eukaryota
- Kingdom: Animalia
- Phylum: Arthropoda
- Class: Insecta
- Order: Lepidoptera
- Family: Gracillariidae
- Genus: Acrocercops
- Species: A. macaria

Binomial name
- Acrocercops macaria Turner, 1913

Species of moth

Acrocercops macaria is a moth of the family Gracillariidae. It is known from Queensland and New South Wales, Australia.

The larvae feed on Acronychia baueri, Acronychia laevis, Euodia micrococca, Halfordia drupifera and Halfordia kendack. They mine the leaves of their host plant.
