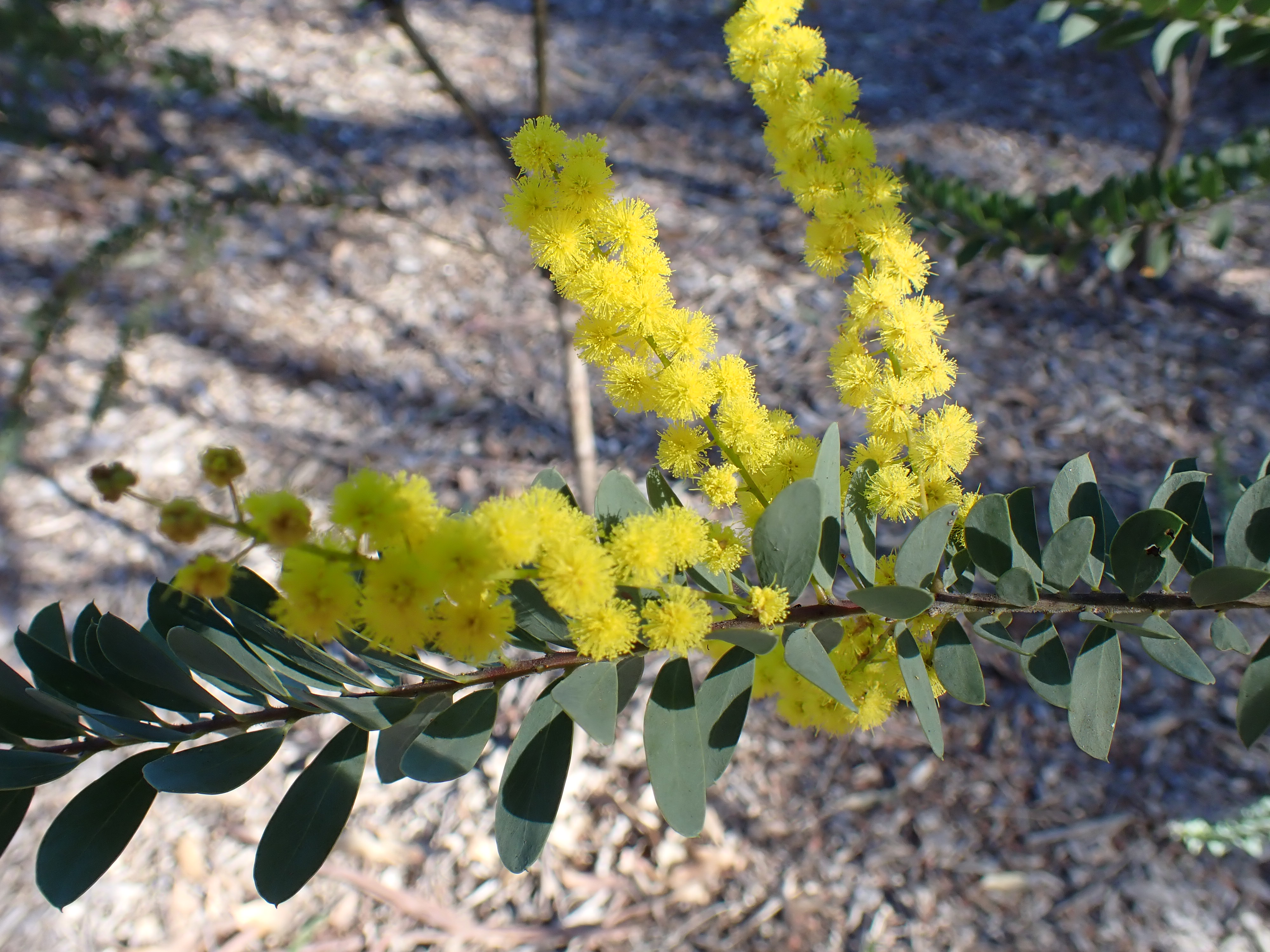

Scientific classification
- Kingdom: Plantae
- Clade: Embryophytes
- Clade: Tracheophytes
- Clade: Angiosperms
- Clade: Eudicots
- Clade: Rosids
- Order: Fabales
- Family: Fabaceae
- Subfamily: Caesalpinioideae
- Clade: Mimosoid clade
- Genus: Acacia
- Species: A. semilunata

Binomial name
- Acacia semilunata Maiden & Blakely
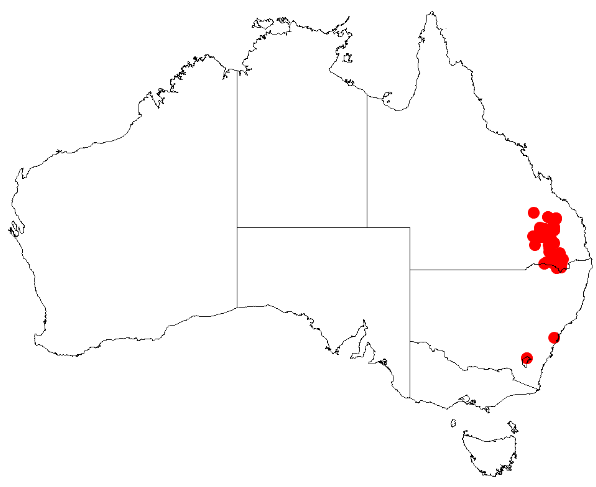
- Acacia semilunata occurrence data from Australasian Virtual Herbarium

Synonyms
- Racosperma semilunatum (Maiden & Blakely) Pedley

= Acacia semilunata =

Species of legume

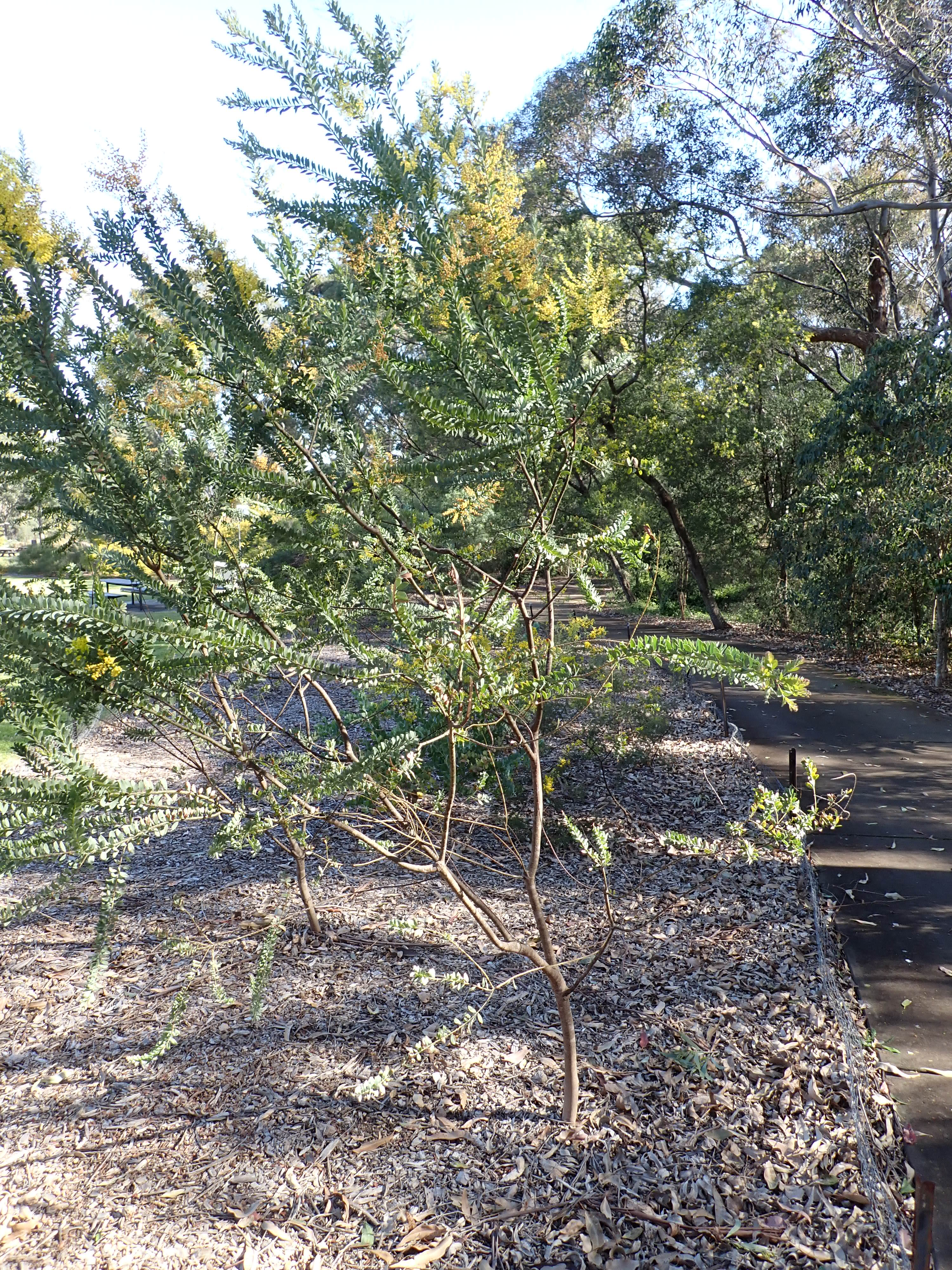
Habit in Mount Annan Botanic Garden

Acacia semilunata, commonly known as crescent-leaved wattle, is a species of flowering plant in the family Fabaceae and is endemic to South East Queensland, Australia. It is a shrub or tree with terete branchlets covered with soft hairs, somewhat crowded narrowly elliptic to oblong phyllodes, racemes of spherical heads of golden yellow flowers, and linear, slightly curved, firmly leathery pods.

== Description ==
Acacia semilunata is a compact shrub or tree that typically grows to a height of up to about 5 m (16 ft), and has terete branchlets sometimes covered with a fine powdery bloom, and normally covered with soft hairs. The phyllodes are somewhat crowded, mostly narrowly elliptic to oblong, the lower margin more or less straight and the upper margin curved, 15–30 mm (0.59–1.18 in) long and 5–9 mm (0.20–0.35 in) wide, thin grey-green to glaucous. The midvein is more or less central and the phyllodes are covered with a powdery bloom when young. The flowers are borne in spherical heads on usually glabrous racemes mostly 20–60 mm (0.79–2.36 in) long, the peduncles 2–6 mm (0.079–0.236 in) long, each head with 15 to 20 golden yellow flowers. Flowering occurs in July and August and the pod are linear, slightly curved, firmly leathery, up to 80 mm (3.1 in) long and 3.5–5 mm (0.14–0.20 in) wide, glabrous and usually covered with a powdery bloom. The seeds are oblong, 4.0–4.5 mm (0.16–0.18 in) long, slightly shiny black with a club-shaped aril.

== Taxonomy ==
Acacia semilunata was first formally described in 1927 by Joseph Maiden and William Blakely in the Proceedings of the Royal Society of Queensland from specimens collected on Knockbreak Station via Chinchilla by Thomas Lane Bancroft in 1918.

== Distribution and habitat ==
This species of wattle only in a small area in south eastern Queensland from Knockbreak Station and south to near Stanthorpe where it grows on low rocky hills in sand or sandy-loamy in open Eucalyptus communities.

== Conservation status ==
Acacia semilunata is listed as 'least concern' under the Queensland Government Nature Conservation Act 1992.

== See also ==
- List of Acacia species
