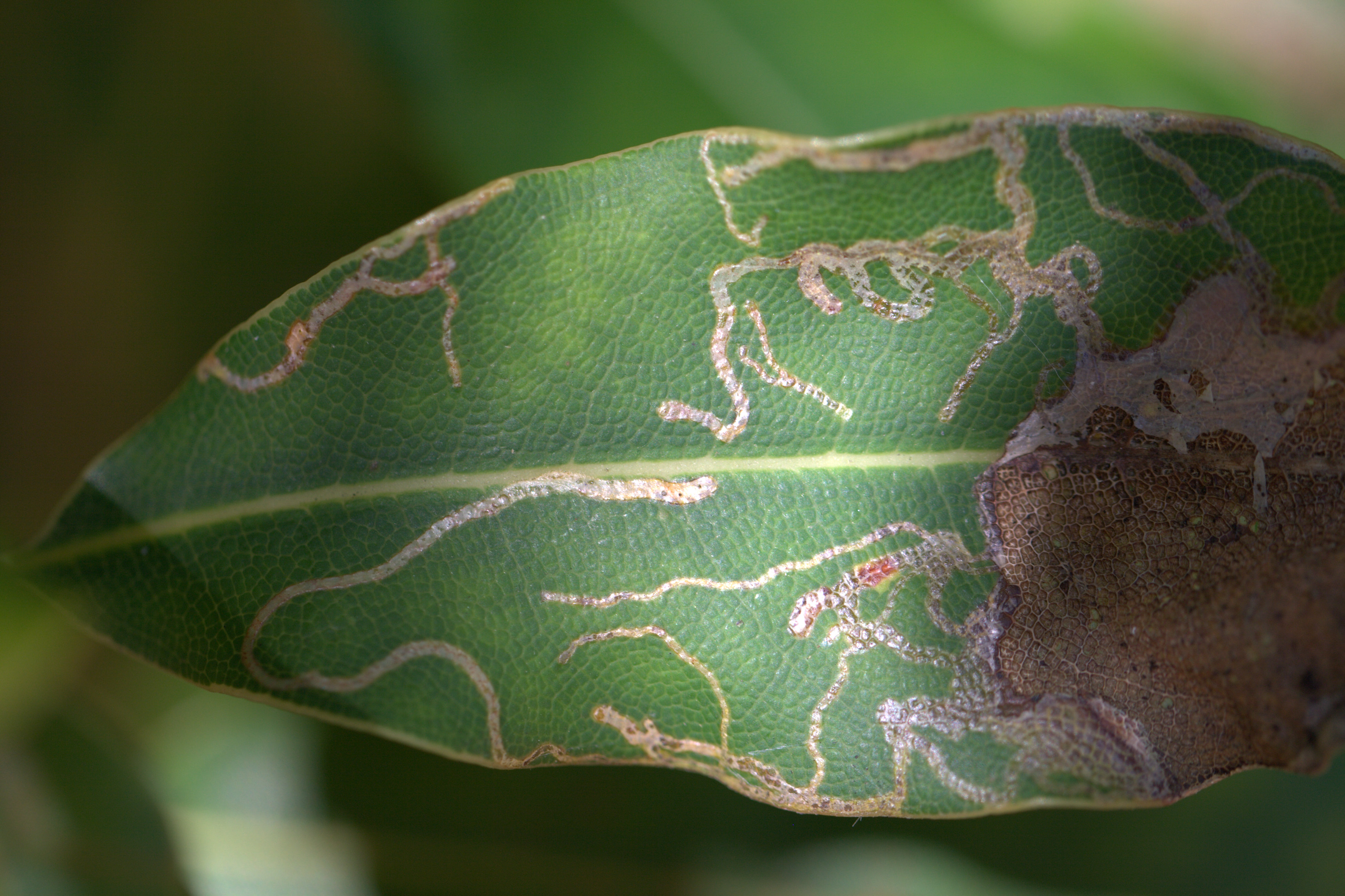

Scientific classification
- Kingdom: Animalia
- Phylum: Arthropoda
- Clade: Pancrustacea
- Class: Insecta
- Order: Lepidoptera
- Family: Gracillariidae
- Genus: Acrocercops
- Species: A. chionosema

Binomial name
- Acrocercops chionosema Turner, 1940

= Acrocercops chionosema =

Macadamia leaf miner

Species of moth

Acrocercops chionosema (macadamia leaf miner) is a moth of the family Gracillariidae. It is known from Queensland and New South Wales, Australia.

The wingspan is about 6 mm.

The larvae feed on Macadamia species (including Macadamia integrifolia and Macadamia tetraphylla) and Stenocarpus species (including Stenocarpus salignus). They mine the leaves of their host plant.
