= Macarostola formosa =

Scientific classification
- Kingdom: Animalia
- Phylum: Arthropoda
- Clade: Pancrustacea
- Class: Insecta
- Order: Lepidoptera
- Family: Gracillariidae
- Genus: Macarostola
- Species: M. formosa

Binomial name
- Macarostola formosa (Stainton, 1862)

Synonyms
- Gracilaria formosa Stainton, 1862

Species of moth

Macarostola formosa is a moth of the family Gracillariidae. It is known from Australia (the Northern Territory, Queensland, New South Wales and Victoria) and New Zealand.

The larvae feed on Acmena smithii and Eugenia ventenatii. They probably mine the leaves of their host plant.
