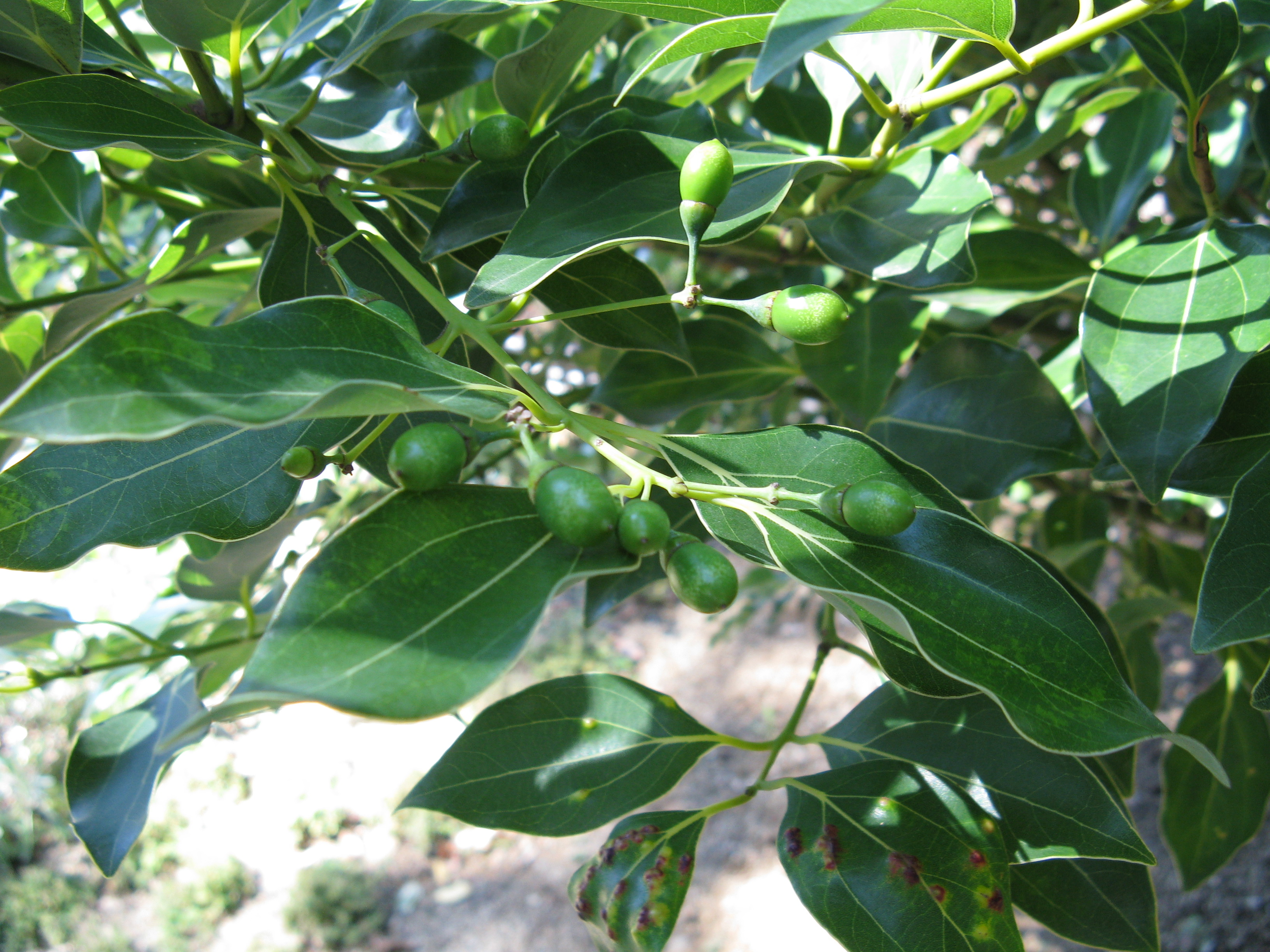

Conservation status
- Least Concern (IUCN 3.1)

Scientific classification
- Kingdom: Plantae
- Clade: Embryophytes
- Clade: Tracheophytes
- Clade: Spermatophytes
- Clade: Angiosperms
- Clade: Magnoliids
- Order: Laurales
- Family: Lauraceae
- Genus: Cinnamomum
- Species: C. tenuifolium

Binomial name
- Cinnamomum tenuifolium (Makino) Sugim.

Synonyms
- Cinnamomum brevifolium Miq.; Cinnamomum japonicum Sieb.; Cinnamomum pedunculatum Nees

= Cinnamomum tenuifolium =

Species of tree

Cinnamomum tenuifolium, commonly known as Japanese cinnamon, is an evergreen tree in the genus Cinnamomum. It is a small- or medium-sized tree up to 15 m (49 ft) tall that occurs in Japan, Korea, Taiwan, and eastern China (Anhui, Fujian, Sichuan, Jiangsu, Jiangxi, and Zhejiang provinces). In China it is under second-class national protection.

== Range and habitat ==
Cinnamomum tenuifolium is known from 40 to 50 localities in southern Japan, southern Korea, Taiwan, and Anhui, Fujian, Jiangsu, Jiangxi, and Zhejiang provinces of eastern China. The species has a large extent of occurrence (EOO) of 1,235,974 km^{2}, and an area of occupancy (AOO) of 68 km^{2}.

Its typical habitat is lowland evergreen forest between 300 and 1,000 meters elevation.

== Conservation and threats ==
Cinnamomum tenuifolium is affected by habitat loss from deforestation and conversion of forests to agriculture and plantations. The species' extent of occurrence and area of occupancy are declining. Despite declining habitat, the species' conservation status is assessed Least Concern in consideration of its wide extent of occurrence and large number of locations.

== Uses ==
The timber is hard and durable, and is used for furniture and house construction.

Volatile oil from the bark and leafy branchlets is used as perfume. Oil and fat from fruit kernels is used to make soap.
