= List of Castanopsis species =

Plants of the World Online recognizes about 143 accepted species in the plant genus Castanopsis of the beech family Fagaceae. Individual species are described in detail on www.asianfagaceae.com.

== A ==
- Castanopsis acuminatissima (Blume) A. DC. (= Castanea acuminatissima Blume, Quercus junghuhnii Miq.) – Bangladesh to Indochina, south-central China, Malesia, and Papuasia.
- Castanopsis amabilis W.C.Cheng & C.S.Chao – China (southwest Guangxi)
- Castanopsis annamensis Hickel & A.Camus – Vietnam and south-central China
- Castanopsis argentea (Blume) A. DC. (= Castanea argentea (Blume) Blume) – India, Myanmar, Thailand, Sumatra, Borneo, and Java
- Castanopsis argyrophylla King ex Hook. f. – Bangladesh and Indochina to China (southern Yunnan)
- Castanopsis arietina Hickel & A.Camus – Vietnam
- Castanopsis armata (Roxb.) Spach – Arunachal Pradesh and Bangladesh to Indochina

== B ==
- Castanopsis birmanica A.Camus – Myanmar
- Castanopsis boisii Hickel & A.Camus – China (Guangdong, Guangxi, Yunnan, and Hainan) and Vietnam
- Castanopsis borneensis King – Borneo
- Castanopsis brevispinula Hickel & A.Camus – northern Thailand and Laos
- Castanopsis buruana Miq. – northern Borneo, Sulawesi, Maluku

== C ==
- Castanopsis calathiformis (Skan) Rehder & E.H.Wilson – Assam to Indochina and China (Yunnan)
- Castanopsis cambodiana A.Chev. Cambodia
- Castanopsis carlesii (Hemsl.) Hayata (= Quercus carlesii Hemsl.) – southern China, Taiwan, and Vietnam
- Castanopsis castanicarpa (Roxb.) Spach Bangladesh and Myanmar
- Castanopsis catappifolia King ex Hook.f. – Peninsular Malaysia
- Castanopsis ceratacantha Rehder & E.H.Wilson – Indochina and south-central China
- Castanopsis cerebrina (Hickel & A.Camus) Barnett – south-central China and northern Indochina
- Castanopsis chapaensis Luong – Vietnam
- Castanopsis chevalieri Hickel & A.Camus – Vietnam
- Castanopsis chinensis (Spreng.) Hance – southern China, southern Taiwan, Vietnam
- Castanopsis choboensis Hickel & A.Camus – China (Yunnan, Guizhou, Guangxi) and Vietnam
- Castanopsis chunii W.C.Cheng – southern China
- Castanopsis clarkei King ex Hook f. – Bhutan to Indochina
- Castanopsis clemensii Soepadmo – Borneo (Sabah)
- Castanopsis concinna (Champ. ex Benth.) A.DC. – China (Guangdong, Guangxi, Hong Kong)
- Castanopsis costata (Blume) A.DC. – Thailand and western Malesia
- Castanopsis crassifolia Hickel & A.Camus – China (Guangxi) and Indochina
- Castanopsis cryptoneuron (H.Lév.) A.Camus – China (Yunnan)
- Castanopsis curtisii King – Peninsular Malaysia
- Castanopsis cuspidata (Thunb.) Schottky – South Korea (Jeju) and southern and central Japan

== D ==
- Castanopsis delavayi Franch. – southern China
- Castanopsis densinervia Soepadmo – northern Borneo
- Castanopsis densispinosa Y.C.Hsu & H.Wei Jen – China (Yunnan)
- Castanopsis diversifolia (Kurz) King ex Hook. f. (= Castanea diversifolia Kurz) – Indochina and China (Yunnan)
- Castanopsis dongchoenensis Hickel & A.Camus – Vietnam
- Castanopsis dongnaiensis Son & Ngoc – Vietnam

== E ==
- Castanopsis echinocarpa Miq. – Nepal to Indochina and southern China
- Castanopsis echinophora A.Camus – Vietnam
- Castanopsis endertii Hatus. ex Soepadmo – Borneo
- Castanopsis evansii Elmer – northern and eastern Borneo, Philippines (Palawan)
- Castanopsis eyrei (Champ. ex Benth.) Tutcher (= Castanopsis caudata Franch., Quercus eyrei Champ. ex Benth.) – southern China and Taiwan

== F ==
- Castanopsis faberi Hance (= Castanopsis stellatospina Hayata) – south-central and southeastern China, Taiwan, and Vietnam
- Castanopsis fargesii Franch. (= Castanopsis taiwaniana Hayata) – southern China and Taiwan
- Castanopsis ferox (Roxb.) Spach – Sikkim to Indochina and China (Yunnan)
- Castanopsis fissa (Champ. ex Benth.) Rehder & E.H.Wilson – southeastern China to Indochina
- Castanopsis fleuryi Hickel & A.Camus – Laos, China (Yunnan)
- Castanopsis fordii Hance – southern China and northern Thailand
- Castanopsis foxworthyi Schottky – Peninsular Malaysia and western Borneo
- Castanopsis fulva Gamble – Peninsular Malaysia, Sumatra, and Borneo

== G ==
- Castanopsis gamblei Hickel & A.Camus – Laos to northwestern Vietnam
- Castanopsis glabra Merr. – Philippines (Leyte)
- Castanopsis glabrifolia J.Q.Li & Li Chen – Hainan
- Castanopsis grandicicatricata N.H.Xia & D.H.Vuong – Vietnam
- Castanopsis griffithii A.Camus – Myanmar
- Castanopsis guinieri A.Camus – Vietnam

== H ==
- Castanopsis hainanensis Merr. – Hainan
- Castanopsis harmandii – Laos
- Castanopsis hsiensiui J.Q.Li & Li Chen – Hainan
- Castanopsis hupehensis C.S.Chao – China (Guizhou, Hunan, Sichuan, Hubei)
- Castanopsis hypophoenicea (Seemen) Soepadmo – Borneo

== I ==
- Castanopsis indica (Roxb. ex Lindl.) A. DC. – Nepal to Indochina, southern China, and Taiwan
- Castanopsis inermis (Lindl.) Benth. & Hook. f. (= Callaeocarpus sumatrana Miq., Castanea inermis Lindl., Castanopsis sumatrana (Miq.) A. DC.) – Myanmar, Thailand, Peninsular Malaysia, Sumatra, and Philippines

== J ==
- Castanopsis javanica (Blume) A. DC. (= Castanea javanica (Blume) Blume, Fagus javanica Blume, Quercus discocarpa Hance, Quercus javanica (Blume) Drake) – Thailand, Peninsular Malaysia, Sumatra, Borneo, Java
- Castanopsis jianfenglingensis Duanmu – Hainan
- Castanopsis jinpingensis J.Q.Li & Li Chen – China (Yunnan)
- Castanopsis johorensis Soepadmo – Peninsular Malaysia (Johor)
- Castanopsis jucunda Hance – southern China

== K ==
- Castanopsis kawakamii Hayata – southeastern China, Taiwan, Vietnam
- Castanopsis kweichowensis Hu – China (Guizhou, Guangxi)

== L ==
- Castanopsis lamontii Hance – southern China and Vietnam
- Castanopsis lanceifolia (Oerst.) Hickel & A. Camus – Nepal to Indochina
- Castanopsis lecomtei Hickel & A.Camus – Vietnam
- Castanopsis longipes A.Camus – Vietnam
- Castanopsis longipetiolata Hickel & A.Camus – Vietnam
- Castanopsis longispina (King ex Hook.f.) C.C.Huang & Y.T.Zhang – eastern Himalayas and Tibet
- Castanopsis lucida (Nees) Soepadmo – Peninsular Malaysia, Borneo

== M ==
- Castanopsis malaccensis Gamble – Peninsular Thailand, Peninsular Malaysia, Sumatra
- Castanopsis malipoensis C.C.Huang ex J.Q.Li & Li Chen – China (Yunnan)
- Castanopsis megacarpa Gamble – Peninsular Thailand, Peninsular Malaysia, Borneo
- Castanopsis mekongensis A.Camus – China (Yunnan), Laos, and Vietnam
- Castanopsis microphylla Soepadmo – Borneo
- Castanopsis motleyana King – Borneo, Philippines
- Castanopsis multiporcata N.H.Xia & D.H.Vuong – Vietnam

== N ==
- Castanopsis namdinhensis Hickel & A.Camus – Vietnam, Laos, and Cambodia
- Castanopsis neocavaleriei A.Camus – China (Guizhou)
- Castanopsis nephelioides King ex Hook f. – Thailand and Peninsular Malaysia
- Castanopsis nhatrangensis Hickel & A.Camus – Vietnam
- Castanopsis ninhhoensis Hickel & A.Camus – Vietnam

== O ==
- Castanopsis oblonga Y.C.Hsu & H.Wei Jen – China (Yunnan)
- Castanopsis oliefera G.A.Fu – Hainan
- Castanopsis oligoneura Soepadmo – Borneo (Sabah)
- Castanopsis orthacantha Franch. – China (Yunnan)
- Castanopsis ouonbiensis Hickel & A.Camus – China (southeastern and Yunnan) and Vietnam
- Castanopsis oviformis Soepadmo – Borneo

== P ==
- Castanopsis pathakii Shankh.Mitra, Ranjan & D.Maity – Arunachal Pradesh
- Castanopsis paucispina Soepadmo – western Borneo
- Castanopsis pedunculata Soepadmo – northern Borneo
- Castanopsis philipensis (Blanco) S. Vidal (= Fagus philipensis Blanco) – Philippines
- Castanopsis phuthoensis Luong – Vietnam
- Castanopsis pierrei Hance – Cambodia and Thailand
- Castanopsis piriformis Hickel & A.Camus – Thailand, Laos, Cambodia, and Vietnam
- Castanopsis platyacantha Rehder & E.H.Wilson – China (Guizhou, Sichuan, Yunnan)
- Castanopsis poilanei Hickel & A.Camus – Vietnam
- Castanopsis pseudohystrix Phengklai – Thailand
- Castanopsis psilophylla Soepadmo – Borneo, Philippines (Palawan)
- Castanopsis purpurea Barnett – Thailand
- Castanopsis purpurella (Miq.) N.P.Balakr. – Nepal to northern Indochina, southern China, and Taiwan
  - Castanopsis purpurella subsp. laotica (Hickel & A.Camus) Govaerts – Laos
  - Castanopsis purpurella subsp. purpurella (= Castanopsis hystrix Miq.) – Nepal to northern Indochina, southern China, and Taiwan

== Q ==
- Castanopsis qiongbeiensis G.A.Fu – Hainan

== R ==
- Castanopsis remotidenticulata Hu – China (Yunnan)
- Castanopsis rhamnifolia (Miq.) A.DC. – Myanmar, Thailand, Peninsular Malaysia, Sumatra
- Castanopsis ridleyi Gamble – Peninsular Malaysia
- Castanopsis rockii A.Camus – China (Yunnan) and northern Indochina
- Castanopsis rufotomentosa Hu – China (Yunnan)

== S ==
- Castanopsis schefferiana Hance – Thailand, Peninsular Malaysia, and northeastern Sumatra
- Castanopsis sclerophylla (Lindl. & Paxton) Schottky (= Quercus chinensis C. Abel, Quercus sclerophylla Lindl. & Paxton) – southern China
- Castanopsis scortechinii Gamble – Peninsular Malaysia
- Castanopsis selangorensis A.Camus – Peninsular Malaysia
- Castanopsis semifabri X.M.Chen & B.P.Yu – Hainan
- Castanopsis siamensis Duanmu – northern Thailand
- Castanopsis sieboldii (Makino) Hatus. (= Castanopsis cuspidata var. sieboldii (Makino) Nakai, Pasania cuspidata var. sieboldii Makino) – South Korea, central and southern Japan, Ryukyu Islands
- Castanopsis symmetricupulata Luong – Vietnam

== T ==
- Castanopsis tcheponensis Hickel & A.Camus – China (Yunnan), Vietnam, Laos, and Myanmar
- Castanopsis tessellata Hickel & A. Camus – China (Yunnan), Vietnam, and Laos
- Castanopsis thaiensis Phengklai – northern Thailand
- Castanopsis tibetana Hance – Tibet and southern China
- Castanopsis tonkinensis Seemen – southern China, Hainan, and Vietnam
- Castanopsis torulosa Hickel & A. Camus – Vietnam
- Castanopsis touranensis Hickel & A. Camus – Vietnam
- Castanopsis tranninhensis Hickel & A. Camus – Laos
- Castanopsis tribuloides (Sm.) A. DC. (= Quercus tribuloides Sm.) – west-central Himalayas to Indochina and south-central China
- Castanopsis trichocarpa G.A.Fu – Hainan
- Castanopsis trinervis (H.Lév.) A.Camus – China (Guizhou)
- Castanopsis tungurrut (Blume) A. DC. (= Castanea tungurrut Blume) – Peninsular Malaysia, Sumatra, Java

== U ==
- Castanopsis undulatifolia G.A.Fu – Hainan

== W ==
- Castanopsis wallichii King ex Hook f. – Peninsular Thailand and Peninsular Malaysia
- Castanopsis wattii (King ex Hook.f.) A.Camus – Sikkim, Arunachal Pradesh, Tibet, China (Yunnan)
- Castanopsis wenchangensis G.A.Fu & C.C.Huang – Hainan
- Castanopsis wilsonii Hickel & A.Camus – Vietnam
- Castanopsis wuzhishanensis G.A.Fu – Hainan

== X ==
- Castanopsis xichouensis C.C.Huang & Y.T.Chang – China (Yunnan)
