= Acrocercops melanoplecta =

Scientific classification
- Domain: Eukaryota
- Kingdom: Animalia
- Phylum: Arthropoda
- Class: Insecta
- Order: Lepidoptera
- Family: Gracillariidae
- Genus: Acrocercops
- Species: A. melanoplecta

Binomial name
- Acrocercops melanoplecta Meyrick, 1908

Species of moth

Acrocercops melanoplecta is a moth of the family Gracillariidae. It is known from Hong Kong, India (Meghalaya), Japan (Honshū, Tusima and the Ryukyu Islands), Nepal and Taiwan.

The wingspan is 7-10.8 mm.

The larvae feed on Castanopsis cuspidata, Castanopsis fissa, Castanopsis hystrix and Castanopsis tribuloides. They mine the leaves of their host plant.
