= Coastal Georgia Botanical Gardens =

Botanical garden in Chatham County, Georgia, US

Coordinates: 31.99853°N 81.27038°W

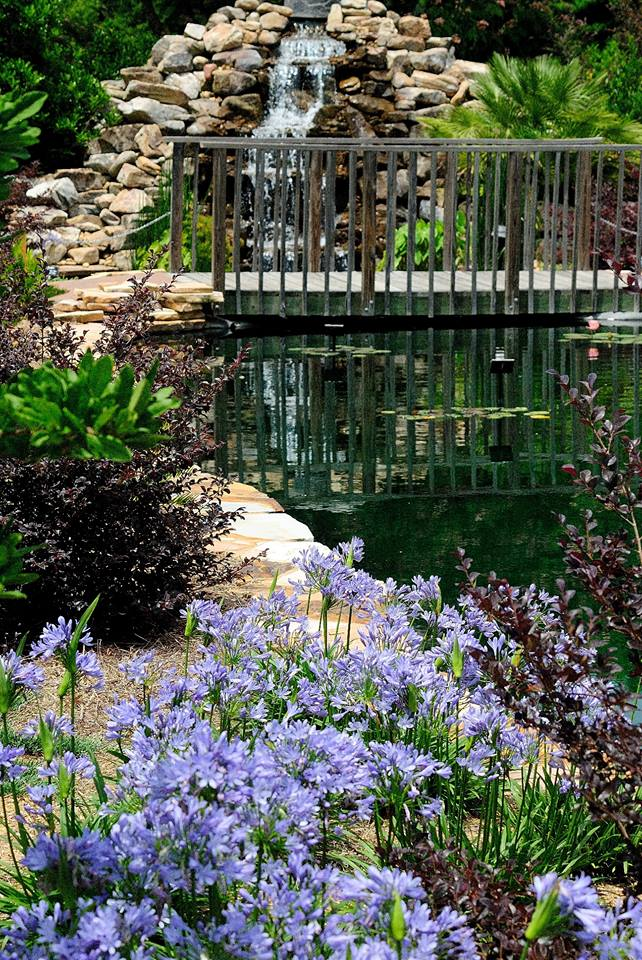
- View of the waterfall at the Water Garden
- Interactive map of Coastal Georgia Botanical Gardens
- Website: Official website

Coastal Georgia Botanical Gardens is a former USDA plant-introduction station that has developed into a public 51-acre multipurpose farm and green space. It is located is Chatham County, Georgia, south of Savannah.

== History ==
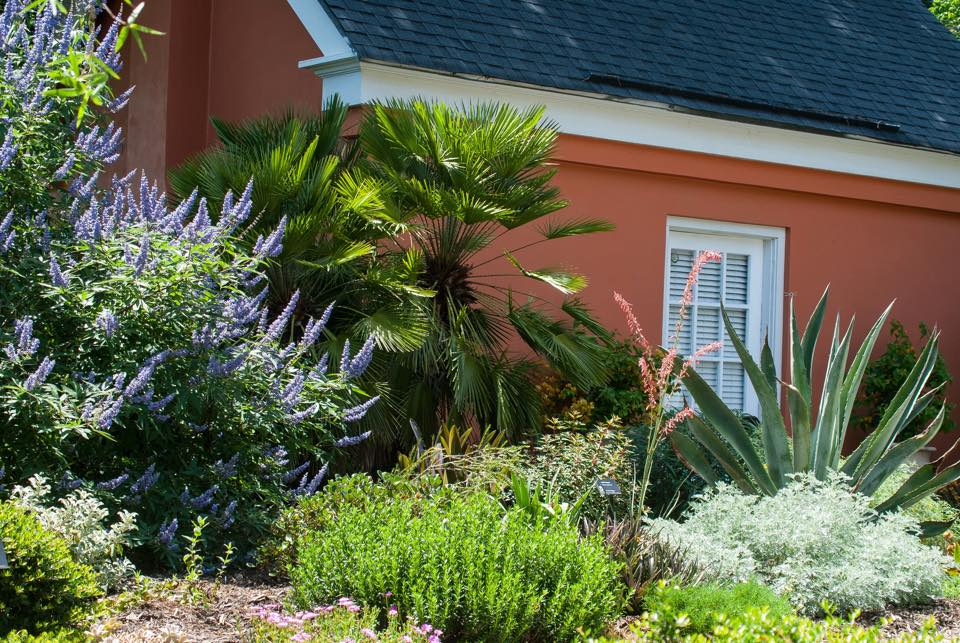
The Mediterranean Garden with the historic Bridal Cottage in background

The garden's collection began in the late 1880s when property owner Mrs. H. B. Miller planted three giant Japanese timber bamboo (Phyllostachys bambusoides) plants. By 1915 an impressive bamboo grove developed, which drew the attention of noted botanist and plant explorer David Fairchild. In 1919 Barbour Lathrop, a friend of Fairchild, purchased the site from Mrs. Miller for $5,430 and leased it to the United States Department of Agriculture (USDA) for $1.

Noted plant explorer Frank Meyer, David Bisset and Alfonso McClure were vital players in the development of the facility as a federally funded plant-introduction station throughout the mid-20th century. In 1979 the USDA closed the site and in 1983 deeded it to the University of Georgia; it remains part of the College of Agricultural and Environmental Sciences.

== Plant collections and gardens ==
Today, Coastal Georgia Botanical Gardens' collections contain around 60 bamboo taxa, said to be the largest American bamboo collection open to the public east of California. Most specimens (genera Phyllostachys and Bambusa) were planted in the 1920s and '30s. It also displays 40 winter-hardy palm species, including numerous cultivars of dwarf palmetto (Sabal minor). With at least 36 different species, the gardens are also home to one of the largest collections of camellia species outside of China, in the Judge Arthur Solomon Camellia Trail. Impressive specimen trees also cast shade across the property, including China fir (Cunninghamia lanceolata), southern magnolia (Magnolia grandiflora), Japanese evergreen oak (Castanopsis delavayi), lord's holly (Ilex rotunda), Oliver maple (Acer oliverianum), Chinese pistachio (Pistacia chinensis), and live oak (Quercus virginiana).

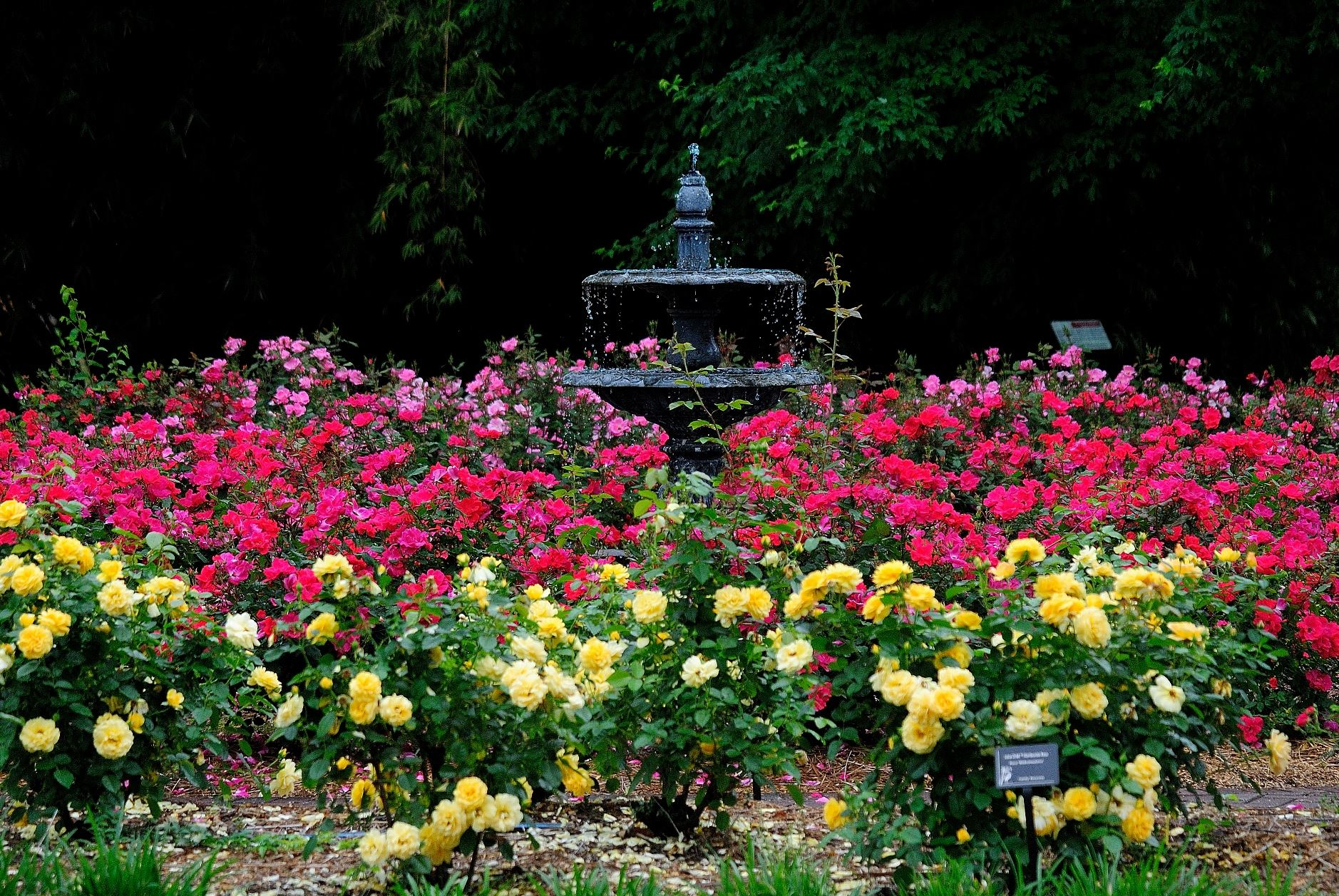
View of the Rose Garden at peak bloom, late April to mid-May

The site also showcases landscape roses, native plants of the state of Georgia, and seasonal annuals and educational displays. A 50,000-gallon water garden was completed on the shores of one of the site's lakes in 2012. In 2013, a Mediterranean-style garden was completed in the area by the Bridal Cottage and Conference Center, historically the original entrance to the property when it was a USDA plant-introduction station. In 2015, the new Andrews Visitor and Education Center opened and is the point of entrance for all visitors from the improved and landscaped Canebrake Road entrance drive.

Four other gardens were completed in 2015. The Woodland Shade Garden offers picturesque views over a chain of lakes, the White Garden boasts three magnificent white pergolas surrounding a lawn and the Formal Garden features four parterres surrounded by olive and white crape myrtles. The Georgia Trustees Garden replica—the agricultural plot began by James Oglethorpe and existed from 1733 to 1755—also was laid out and features edible, medicinal and crop commodities the first settlers to the Georgia colony were expected to produce. Such items included mulberry leaves for silkworms, as well as grapes, pomegranates, stone fruits, cotton, sesame, hops, and sour oranges. In 2016, the Sun Garden was created and is continually receiving new plants to add to this expansive area.

== Events ==
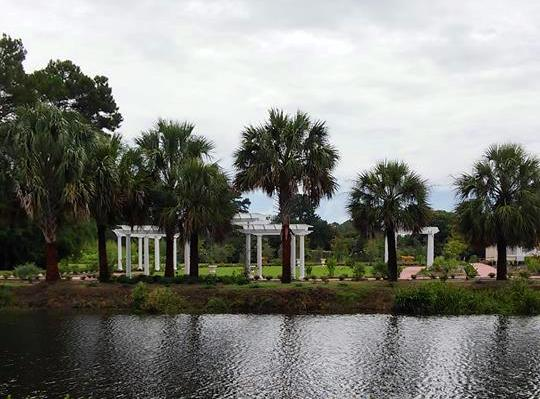
The pergolas of the White Garden

Coastal Georgia Botanical Gardens hosts various special events and gardening classes throughout the year. Among the special events include the Wild Game Supper (February), Spring Plant Sale (March/April on Easter weekend), Autumn Gardenfest (October), and December Nights and Holiday Lights (November/December); the latter features 1,000,000 lights in the evenings. The site also offers visitors "pick your own" fruit fields including strawberries (late-March to May) and blackberries (mid-May to early July). Precise harvest times vary annually depending on the weather.

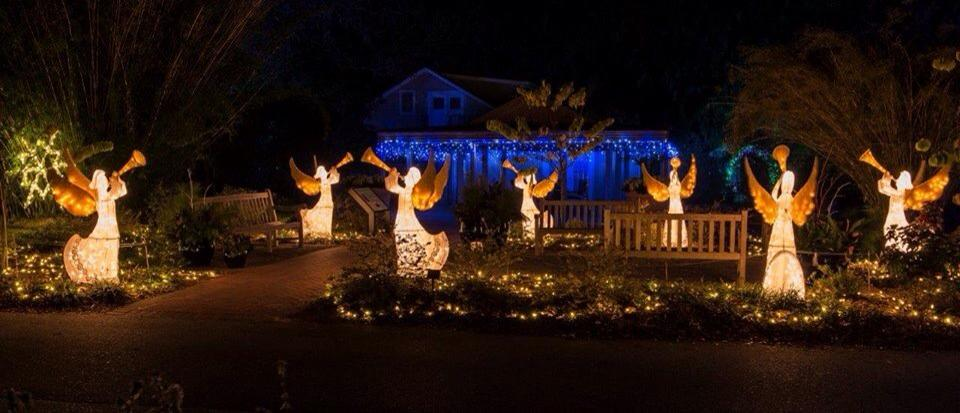
Angels illuminate the Redbud Patio

Coastal Georgia Botanical Gardens is part of the University of Georgia's Extension.

== See also ==
- List of botanical gardens and arboretums in Georgia (U.S. state)
