= C. concinna =

C. concinna may refer to:

- Caladenia concinna, a Western Australian orchid
- Callopistria concinna, an owlet moth
- Calyptranthes concinna, a flowering plant
- Canavalia concinna, a jack-bean
- Canna concinna, a perennial plant
- Caprella concinna, a skeleton shrimp
- Carex concinna, a North American sedge
- Castanopsis concinna, a Chinese tree
- Cerceris concinna, a sphecoid wasp
- Chaetocnema concinna, a leaf beetle
- Chrysemys concinna, a freshwater turtle
- Clarkia concinna, a Californian wildflower
- Coelogyne concinna, a sympodial epiphyte
- Crosseola concinna, a sea snail
- Cyclaspis concinna, a cumacean crustacean
