= Castanopsis pedunculata =

Conservation status
- Near Threatened (IUCN 3.1)

Scientific classification
- Kingdom: Plantae
- Clade: Tracheophytes
- Clade: Angiosperms
- Clade: Eudicots
- Clade: Rosids
- Order: Fagales
- Family: Fagaceae
- Genus: Castanopsis
- Species: C. pedunculata

Binomial name
- Castanopsis pedunculata Soepadmo (1968)

Species of tree

Castanopsis pedunculata is a tree in the family Fagaceae. The specific epithet pedunculata means 'having a peduncle'.

== Description ==
Castanopsis pedunculata grows up to 25 metres (80 ft) tall with a trunk diameter of up to 40 cm (16 in). The brown bark is flaky to lenticellate. The coriaceous leaves measure up to 14 cm (6 in) long. Its ovoid nuts measure up to 2 cm (0.8 in) long.

== Distribution and habitat ==
Castanopsis pedunculata is endemic to Borneo. Its habitat is lowland dipterocarp forests up to 300 m (1,000 ft) elevation.

== Conservation ==
Castanopsis pedunculata has been assessed as near threatened on the IUCN Red List. The species occurs in a number protected areas, where its population is stable. Outside of these areas, the species is threatened by land conversion for agriculture.
