= Castanopsis microphylla =

Conservation status
- Near Threatened (IUCN 3.1)

Scientific classification
- Kingdom: Plantae
- Clade: Tracheophytes
- Clade: Angiosperms
- Clade: Eudicots
- Clade: Rosids
- Order: Fagales
- Family: Fagaceae
- Genus: Castanopsis
- Species: C. microphylla

Binomial name
- Castanopsis microphylla Soepadmo

Species of tree

Castanopsis microphylla is a tree in the family Fagaceae. The specific epithet microphylla is from the Greek meaning 'small-leaved'.

== Description ==
Castanopsis microphylla grows as a tree up to 30 metres (100 ft) tall with a trunk diameter of up to 60 cm (24 in). The bark is smooth, occasionally flaky. The coriaceous leaves measure up to 8 cm (3 in) long. Its ovoid nuts measure up to 1.5 cm (0.6 in) long.

== Distribution and habitat ==
Castanopsis microphylla is endemic to Borneo. Its habitat is lowland dipterocarp to lower montane forests up to 1,600 m (5,200 ft) elevation.
