= Castanopsis oviformis =

Conservation status
- Least Concern (IUCN 3.1)

Scientific classification
- Kingdom: Plantae
- Clade: Tracheophytes
- Clade: Angiosperms
- Clade: Eudicots
- Clade: Rosids
- Order: Fagales
- Family: Fagaceae
- Genus: Castanopsis
- Species: C. oviformis

Binomial name
- Castanopsis oviformis Soepadmo

Species of plant

Castanopsis oviformis is a tree in the family Fagaceae. The specific epithet oviformis means 'egg-shaped', referring to the cupule.

== Description ==
Castanopsis oviformis grows as a tree up to 30 metres (100 ft) tall with a trunk diameter of up to 50 cm (20 in). The brownish bark is scaly or cracked. The coriaceous leaves measure up to 14 cm (6 in) long. Its ovoid nuts measure up to 2.5 cm (1.0 in) long and are considered edible.

== Distribution and habitat ==
Castanopsis oviformis is endemic to Borneo. Its habitat is hill dipterocarp and kerangas forests up to 900 m (3,000 ft) elevation.
