= Castanopsis buruana =

Scientific classification
- Kingdom: Plantae
- Clade: Tracheophytes
- Clade: Angiosperms
- Clade: Eudicots
- Clade: Rosids
- Order: Fagales
- Family: Fagaceae
- Genus: Castanopsis
- Species: C. buruana

Binomial name
- Castanopsis buruana Miq.

Synonyms
- Castanea buruana (Miq.) Oerst.

Species of tree

Castanopsis buruana is a tree in the family Fagaceae. The specific epithet buruana is from the Latin, meaning "of Buru" (one of Indonesia's Maluku Islands).

== Description ==
Castanopsis buruana grows as a tree up to 30 metres (100 ft) tall with a trunk diameter of up to 60 cm (24 in). The brown bark is smooth or scaly. The coriaceous leaves measure up to 13 cm (5 in) long. Its ovoid to roundish nuts measure up to 1.5 cm (0.6 in) long.

== Distribution and habitat ==
Castanopsis buruana grows naturally in Borneo, Sulawesi and Maluku. Its habitat is dipterocarp forests from sea-level to 450 m (1,500 ft) altitude.
