= Castanopsis sclerophylla =

Conservation status
- Least Concern (IUCN 3.1)

Scientific classification
- Kingdom: Plantae
- Clade: Tracheophytes
- Clade: Angiosperms
- Clade: Eudicots
- Clade: Rosids
- Order: Fagales
- Family: Fagaceae
- Genus: Castanopsis
- Species: C. sclerophylla

Binomial name
- Castanopsis sclerophylla (Lindl. & Paxton) Schottky

Synonyms
- Castanopsis chinensis (C.Abel) Schottky; Lithocarpus chinensis (C.Abel) A.Camus; Quercus chinensis C.Abel; Quercus cuspidata var. sinensis A.DC.; Quercus sclerophylla Lindl. & Paxton; Synaedrys sclerophylla (Lindl. & Paxton) Koidz.

Species of flowering plant

Castanopsis sclerophylla (syn. Lithocarpus chinensis), the Chinese tanbark-oak, is a species of flowering plant in the family Fagaceae, native to southern China. In the wild it is typically found growing in broad-leaved evergreen forests at 200 to 1,000 m (700 to 3,300 ft) above sea level. It is an evergreen tree with glossy, thick leaves and attractive flaky bark, and reaches 20 m (66 ft) in height.

The small nuts are edible, and the Chinese process them into a foodstuff similar to tofu. It is used as a street tree in a number of Chinese cities. Hardy to USDA zone 7b, it does well in the southeastern United States, and is offered by several nurseries there under its synonym Lithocarpus chinensis.
