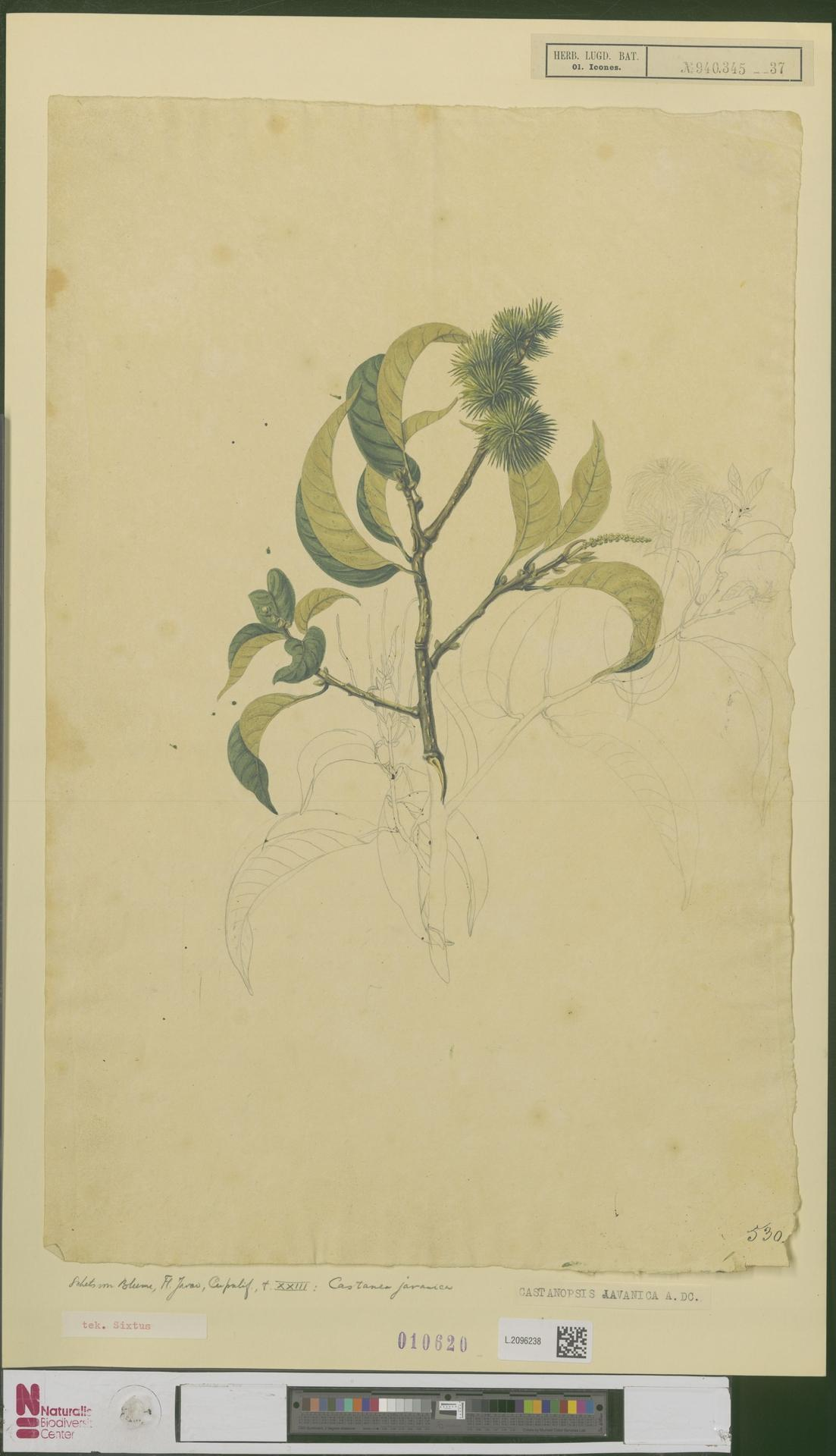
- Botanical drawing

Conservation status
- Least Concern (IUCN 3.1)

Scientific classification
- Kingdom: Plantae
- Clade: Tracheophytes
- Clade: Angiosperms
- Clade: Eudicots
- Clade: Rosids
- Order: Fagales
- Family: Fagaceae
- Genus: Castanopsis
- Species: C. javanica

Binomial name
- Castanopsis javanica (Blume) A.DC.

Synonyms
- Castanea javanica (Blume) Blume; Castanea montana Blume; Castanopsis discocarpa (Hance) Hance; Castanopsis lentiginosa E.F.Warb.; Castanopsis penangensis A.Camus; Fagus javanica Blume; Pasania discocarpa (Hance) Gamble; Quercus discocarpa Hance; Quercus javanica (Blume) Drake; Synaedrys discocarpa (Hance) Koidz.

= Castanopsis javanica =

Species of tree

Castanopsis javanica, the Javan chestnut-oak, is a tree in the beech family Fagaceae. The specific epithet javanica is from the Latin, meaning "of Java".

== Description ==
Castanopsis javanica grows as a tree up to 40 metres (130 ft) tall with a trunk diameter of up to 100 cm (40 in). The brown bark is smooth or scaly. The coriaceous leaves measure up to 13 cm (5 in) long. Its discoid to ovoid nuts measure up to 2.5 cm (1.0 in) long.

== Distribution and habitat ==
Castanopsis javanica grows naturally in Thailand, Borneo, Java, Peninsular Malaysia and Sumatra. Its habitat is hill dipterocarp forests up to 1,000 m (3,300 ft) altitude.

== Uses ==
The wood is locally used in construction. The bark can be used in tanning. The nuts are considered edible.
