= Castanopsis evansii =

Scientific classification
- Kingdom: Plantae
- Clade: Tracheophytes
- Clade: Angiosperms
- Clade: Eudicots
- Clade: Rosids
- Order: Fagales
- Family: Fagaceae
- Genus: Castanopsis
- Species: C. evansii

Binomial name
- Castanopsis evansii Elmer

Synonyms
- Castanopsis elmeri Merr.; Castanopsis woodii Merr.

Species of tree

Castanopsis evansii is a tree in the family Fagaceae. It is named for J. H. Evans, a governor of Puerto Princesa in the Philippines.

== Description ==
Castanopsis evansii grows as a tree up to 20 metres (70 ft) tall with a trunk diameter of up to 30 cm (12 in). The greyish bark is smooth, sometimes flaky. The coriaceous leaves measure up to 17 cm (7 in) long. Its ovoid nuts measure up to 3.5 cm (1.4 in) long.

== Distribution and habitat ==
Castanopsis evansii grows naturally in Borneo and the Philippines. Its habitat is dipterocarp forests up to 500 m (1,600 ft) elevation.
