= Castanopsis fargesii =

Conservation status
- Least Concern (IUCN 3.1)

Scientific classification
- Kingdom: Plantae
- Clade: Tracheophytes
- Clade: Angiosperms
- Clade: Eudicots
- Clade: Rosids
- Order: Fagales
- Family: Fagaceae
- Genus: Castanopsis
- Species: C. fargesii

Binomial name
- Castanopsis fargesii Franch.

Synonyms
- Castanopsis argyracantha A.Camus; Castanopsis taiwaniana Hayata; Pasania ischnostachya Hu

Species of tree

Castanopsis fargesii is a species of evergreen tree native to southern China and Taiwan. It grows 10–30 m tall.

The species was first described by Adrien René Franchet in 1899. The Latin specific epithet fargesii refers to the French missionary and amateur botanist Père Paul Guillaume Farges (1844–1912).

== Habitat and distribution ==
Found in evergreen broad-leaved evergreen forests at 200-2,100 m elevation in Anhui, Fujian, Guangdong, Guangxi, Guizhou, Hubei, Hunan, Jiangsu, Jiangxi, Sichuan, Taiwan, Yunnan and Zhejiang.

== Uses ==
The nuts contain a high quality edible starch. The bark is used to create dyes, and the hardwood has construction and cabinetry applications.
