= Castanopsis megacarpa =

Conservation status
- Least Concern (IUCN 3.1)

Scientific classification
- Kingdom: Plantae
- Clade: Tracheophytes
- Clade: Angiosperms
- Clade: Eudicots
- Clade: Rosids
- Order: Fagales
- Family: Fagaceae
- Genus: Castanopsis
- Species: C. megacarpa

Binomial name
- Castanopsis megacarpa Gamble

Species of tree

Castanopsis megacarpa is a tree in the family Fagaceae. The specific epithet megacarpa is from the Greek meaning 'large fruit'.

== Description ==
Castanopsis megacarpa grows as a tree up to 36 metres (120 ft) tall with a trunk diameter of up to 90 cm (35 in). The grey bark is smooth or slightly fissured. The coriaceous leaves measure up to 24 cm (9 in) long. Its roundish or ellipsoid nuts measure up to 7.5 cm (3.0 in) long.

== Distribution and habitat ==
Castanopsis megacarpa grows naturally in Borneo, Peninsular Malaysia and Singapore, and Peninsular Thailand. Its habitat is dipterocarp, kerangas or lower montane forests up to 1,400 m (4,600 ft) elevation.

== Uses ==
The wood is locally used in making domestic items.
