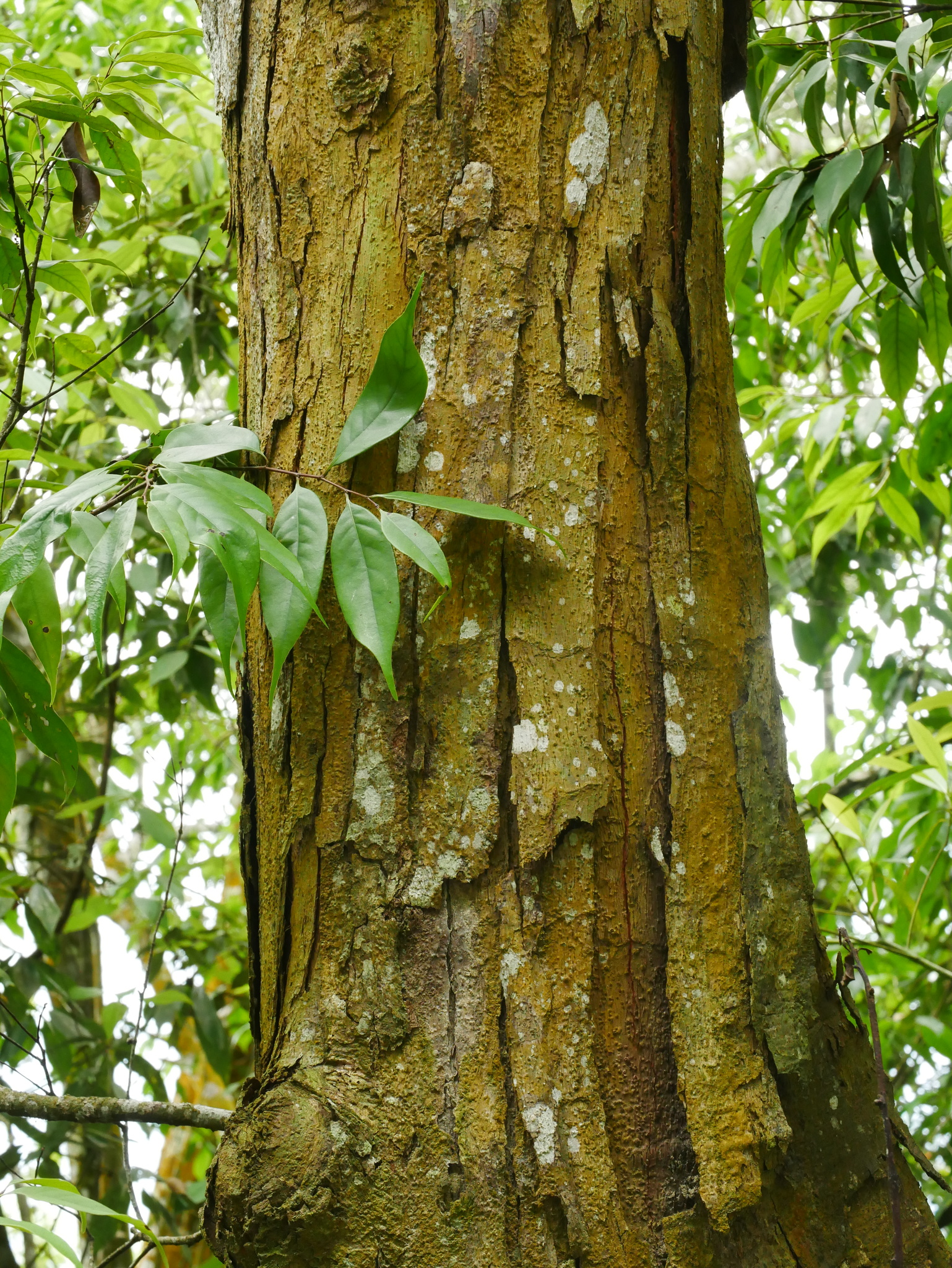

Conservation status
- Near Threatened (IUCN 2.3)

Scientific classification
- Kingdom: Plantae
- Clade: Tracheophytes
- Clade: Angiosperms
- Clade: Eudicots
- Clade: Rosids
- Order: Fagales
- Family: Fagaceae
- Genus: Castanopsis
- Species: C. kawakamii

Binomial name
- Castanopsis kawakamii Hayata

Synonyms
- Castanopsis greenii Chun; Castanopsis oerstedtii Hickel & A.Camus

= Castanopsis kawakamii =

Species of tree

Castanopsis kawakamii is a species of plant in the family Fagaceae. It is found in China, Taiwan, and Vietnam. It is threatened by habitat loss.
