= Castanopsis costata =

Conservation status
- Least Concern (IUCN 3.1)

Scientific classification
- Kingdom: Plantae
- Clade: Tracheophytes
- Clade: Angiosperms
- Clade: Eudicots
- Clade: Rosids
- Order: Fagales
- Family: Fagaceae
- Genus: Castanopsis
- Species: C. costata

Binomial name
- Castanopsis costata (Blume) A.DC.

Synonyms
- Castanea brevicuspis Miq.; Castanea costata Blume; Castanea spectabilis Miq.; Castanopsis brevicuspis (Miq.) A.DC.; Castanopsis spectabilis (Miq.) A.DC.; Castanopsis trisperma Scheff.

Species of tree

Castanopsis costata is a tree in the family Fagaceae. The specific epithet costata is from the Latin meaning 'ribbed', referring to the leaf venation.

== Description ==
Castanopsis costata grows as a tree up to 36 metres (120 ft) tall with a trunk diameter of up to 80 cm (30 in). The whitish bark is smooth, scaly or flaky. The coriaceous leaves measure up to 15 cm (6 in) long. Its conical nuts measure up to 2 cm (0.8 in) long.

== Distribution and habitat ==
Castanopsis costata grows naturally in Thailand, Borneo, Peninsular Malaysia and Sumatra. Its habitat is lowland dipterocarp to montane forests from sea-level to 1,900 m (6,200 ft) elevation.

== Uses ==
The wood is locally used in construction. The nuts are considered edible.
