= Castanopsis clemensii =

Conservation status
- Least Concern (IUCN 3.1)

Scientific classification
- Kingdom: Plantae
- Clade: Tracheophytes
- Clade: Angiosperms
- Clade: Eudicots
- Clade: Rosids
- Order: Fagales
- Family: Fagaceae
- Genus: Castanopsis
- Species: C. clemensii

Binomial name
- Castanopsis clemensii Soepadmo

Species of tree

Castanopsis clemensii is a tree in the family Fagaceae. It is named for the American chaplain and plant collector Joseph Clemens.

== Description ==
Castanopsis clemensii grows as a tree up to 30 metres (100 ft) tall with a trunk diameter of up to 50 cm (20 in). The yellowish white bark is smooth or cracked or lenticellate. The coriaceous leaves measure up to 12 cm (5 in) long. Its ellipsoid nuts measure up to 2 cm (0.8 in) long.

== Distribution and habitat ==
Castanopsis clemensii is endemic to Borneo. Its habitat is lower montane forests to 1,300 m (4,300 ft) elevation.
