= Castanopsis motleyana =

Conservation status
- Least Concern (IUCN 3.1)

Scientific classification
- Kingdom: Plantae
- Clade: Embryophytes
- Clade: Tracheophytes
- Clade: Spermatophytes
- Clade: Angiosperms
- Clade: Eudicots
- Clade: Rosids
- Order: Fagales
- Family: Fagaceae
- Genus: Castanopsis
- Species: C. motleyana

Binomial name
- Castanopsis motleyana King

Synonyms
- Castanopsis pearsonii Merr.

Species of tree

Castanopsis motleyana is a tree in the family Fagaceae. It is named for the botanist James Motley.

== Description ==
Castanopsis motleyana grows as a tree up to 40 metres (130 ft) tall with a trunk diameter of up to 70 cm (28 in). The cracked or scaly bark is reddish to brown. The coriaceous leaves measure up to 25 cm (10 in) long. Its conical to ovoid nuts measure up to 2.5 cm (1.0 in) long.

== Distribution and habitat ==
Castanopsis motleyana is native to Borneo and the Philippines. Its habitat is hill dipterocarp forests up to 500 m (1,600 ft) elevation.
