= Castanopsis curtisii =

Conservation status
- Near Threatened (IUCN 2.3)

Scientific classification
- Kingdom: Plantae
- Clade: Embryophytes
- Clade: Tracheophytes
- Clade: Spermatophytes
- Clade: Angiosperms
- Clade: Eudicots
- Clade: Rosids
- Order: Fagales
- Family: Fagaceae
- Genus: Castanopsis
- Species: C. curtisii

Binomial name
- Castanopsis curtisii King

Species of tree

Castanopsis curtisii is a species of flowering plant in the family Fagaceae. It is a tree endemic to Peninsular Malaysia. It is threatened by habitat loss.
