= Castanopsis oligoneura =

Conservation status
- Vulnerable (IUCN 3.1)

Scientific classification
- Kingdom: Plantae
- Clade: Tracheophytes
- Clade: Angiosperms
- Clade: Eudicots
- Clade: Rosids
- Order: Fagales
- Family: Fagaceae
- Genus: Castanopsis
- Species: C. oligoneura

Binomial name
- Castanopsis oligoneura Soepadmo

Species of tree

Castanopsis oligoneura is a tree in the family Fagaceae. The specific epithet oligoneura is from the Greek meaning 'few nerves', referring to the leaf venation.

== Description ==
Castanopsis oligoneura grows as a tree up to 25 metres (80 ft) tall with a trunk diameter of up to 45 cm (18 in). The brownish bark is smooth to lenticellate. The coriaceous leaves measure up to 15 cm (6 in) long. Its roundish nuts measure up to 2.5 cm (1.0 in) long.

== Distribution and habitat ==
Castanopsis oligoneura is endemic to Borneo. Its habitat is lowland dipterocarp forests up to 300 m (1,000 ft) elevation.
