= Castanopsis philipensis =

Conservation status
- Near Threatened (IUCN 3.1)

Scientific classification
- Kingdom: Plantae
- Clade: Embryophytes
- Clade: Tracheophytes
- Clade: Spermatophytes
- Clade: Angiosperms
- Clade: Eudicots
- Clade: Rosids
- Order: Fagales
- Family: Fagaceae
- Genus: Castanopsis
- Species: C. philipensis

Binomial name
- Castanopsis philipensis (Blanco) Vidal

Synonyms
- Fagus philipensis Blanco

Species of plant

Castanopsis philipensis is a tree species in the family Fagaceae. It is endemic to the Philippines.
