= Castanopsis hypophoenicea =

Conservation status
- Least Concern (IUCN 3.1)

Scientific classification
- Kingdom: Plantae
- Clade: Tracheophytes
- Clade: Angiosperms
- Clade: Eudicots
- Clade: Rosids
- Order: Fagales
- Family: Fagaceae
- Genus: Castanopsis
- Species: C. hypophoenicea

Binomial name
- Castanopsis hypophoenicea (Seemen) Soepadmo

Synonyms
- Castanopsis disperispina Merr.; Lithocarpus hypophoeniceus (Seemen) Barnett; Quercus hypophoenicea Seemen

Species of tree

Castanopsis hypophoenicea is a tree in the family Fagaceae. The specific epithet hypophoenicea means 'crimson beneath', referring to the indumentum on the leaf underside.

== Description ==
Castanopsis hypophoenicea grows as a tree up to 30 metres (100 ft) tall with a trunk diameter of up to 60 cm (24 in). The greyish bark is rough, sometimes smooth. The coriaceous leaves measure up to 17 cm (7 in) long. Its ovoid or ellipsoid nuts measure up to 6 cm (2.4 in) long.

== Distribution and habitat ==
Castanopsis hypophoenicea is endemic to Borneo. Its habitat is dipterocarp forests up to 800 m (2,600 ft) elevation.
