= Castanopsis wallichii =

Conservation status
- Vulnerable (IUCN 2.3)

Scientific classification
- Kingdom: Plantae
- Clade: Tracheophytes
- Clade: Angiosperms
- Clade: Eudicots
- Clade: Rosids
- Order: Fagales
- Family: Fagaceae
- Genus: Castanopsis
- Species: C. wallichii

Binomial name
- Castanopsis wallichii King ex Hook.f.

Species of tree

Castanopsis wallichii is a species of plant in the family Fagaceae. It is a tree found in Peninsular Malaysia and Singapore. It is threatened by habitat loss.
