= Castanopsis fulva =

Conservation status
- Least Concern (IUCN 3.1)

Scientific classification
- Kingdom: Plantae
- Clade: Tracheophytes
- Clade: Angiosperms
- Clade: Eudicots
- Clade: Rosids
- Order: Fagales
- Family: Fagaceae
- Genus: Castanopsis
- Species: C. fulva

Binomial name
- Castanopsis fulva Gamble

Species of tree

Castanopsis fulva is a tree in the beech family Fagaceae. The specific epithet fulva is from the Latin meaning 'tawny', referring to the indumentum.

== Description ==
Castanopsis fulva grows as a tree up to 25 metres (80 ft) tall with a trunk diameter of up to 50 cm (20 in). The bark is smooth or fissured. The coriaceous leaves measure up to 17 cm (7 in) long. Its ovoid or conical nuts measure up to 2 cm (0.8 in) long.

== Distribution and habitat ==
Castanopsis fulva grows naturally in Borneo, Peninsular Malaysia and Sumatra. Its habitat is hill dipterocarp and kerangas forests up to 1,100 m (3,600 ft) elevation.
