= Castanopsis lucida =

Scientific classification
- Kingdom: Plantae
- Clade: Tracheophytes
- Clade: Angiosperms
- Clade: Eudicots
- Clade: Rosids
- Order: Fagales
- Family: Fagaceae
- Genus: Castanopsis
- Species: C. lucida

Binomial name
- Castanopsis lucida (Nees) Soepadmo

Synonyms
- Alseodaphne lucida Nees; Castanopsis hullettii King ex Hook.f.; Laurus lucida Wall.

Species of tree

Castanopsis lucida is a tree in the family Fagaceae. The specific epithet lucida is from the Latin meaning 'shining', referring to the leaf surface.

== Description ==
Castanopsis lucida grows as a tree up to 20 metres (70 ft) tall with a trunk diameter of up to 40 cm (16 in). The brown bark is glabrescent, lenticellate, fissured or occasionally smooth. The coriaceous leaves measure up to 21 cm (8 in) long. Its ovoid nuts measure up to 2 cm (0.8 in) long.

== Distribution and habitat ==
Castanopsis lucida grows naturally in Borneo, Peninsular Malaysia and Singapore. Its habitat is hill dipterocarp forests up to 500 m (1,600 ft) elevation.

== Uses ==
The bark produces tannin. The nuts are considered edible.
