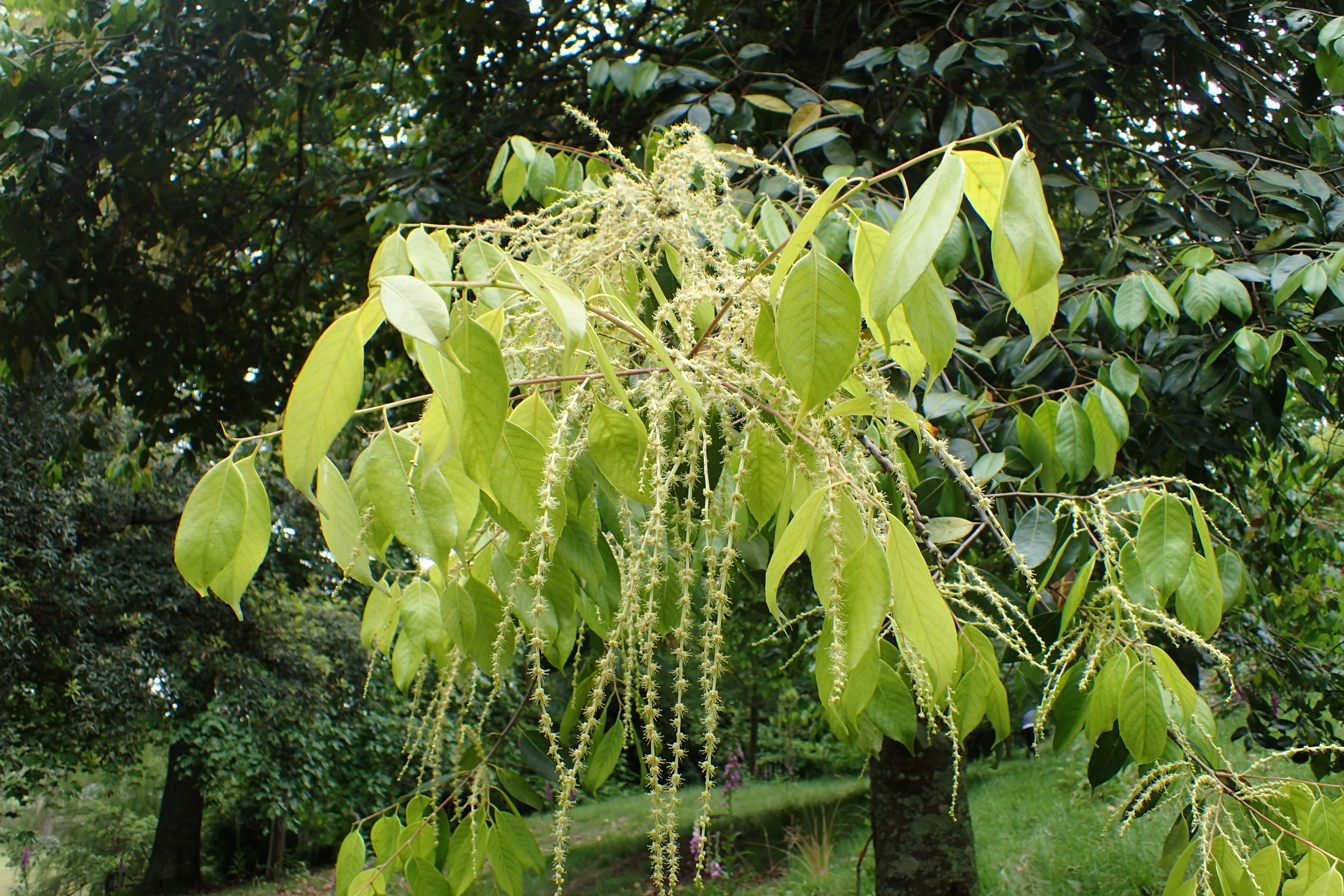
- Inflorescences
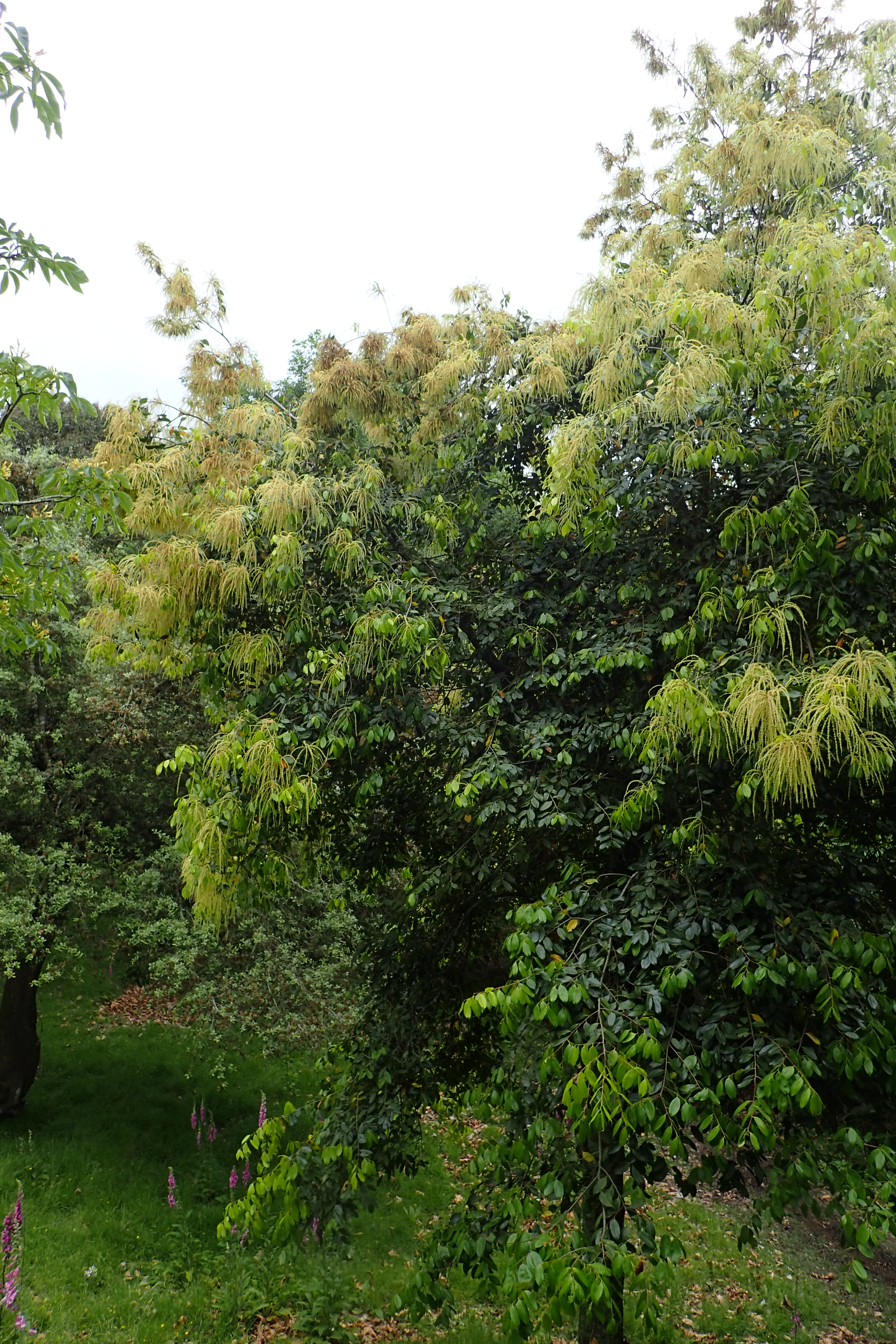
- In Hackfalls Arboretum

Conservation status
- Least Concern (IUCN 3.1)

Scientific classification
- Kingdom: Plantae
- Clade: Tracheophytes
- Clade: Angiosperms
- Clade: Eudicots
- Clade: Rosids
- Order: Fagales
- Family: Fagaceae
- Genus: Castanopsis
- Species: C. eyrei

Binomial name
- Castanopsis eyrei (Champ. ex Benth.) Tutch.

Synonyms
- List: Castanopsis asymmetrica H.Lév.; Castanopsis brachyacantha Hayata ex Koidz.; Castanopsis brachyacantha Hayata; Castanopsis caudata Franch.; Castanopsis chingii A.Camus; Castanopsis eyrei var. brachyacantha (Hayata) C.F.Shen; Castanopsis incana A.Camus; Lithocarpus brachyacanthus (Hayata) Koidz.; Lithocarpus eyrei (Champ. ex Benth.) Rehder; Pasania eyrei (Champ. ex Benth.) Oerst.; Quercus eyrei Champ. ex Benth.; Quercus pinfaensis H.Lév.; Shiia brachyacantha (Hayata ex Koidz.) Kudô & Masam.

= Castanopsis eyrei =

Species of flowering plant

Castanopsis eyrei is a species of flowering plant in the family Fagaceae, native to southern China, and Taiwan. An evergreen tree typically 8 to 20 m (25 to 65 ft) tall, it is usually found in late successional forests from 300 to 1,700 m (950 to 5,600 ft) above sea level, where it is often the dominant species. It is used as a street tree in a number of southern Chinese cities.
