= Castanopsis endertii =

Conservation status
- Vulnerable (IUCN 3.1)

Scientific classification
- Kingdom: Plantae
- Clade: Tracheophytes
- Clade: Angiosperms
- Clade: Eudicots
- Clade: Rosids
- Order: Fagales
- Family: Fagaceae
- Genus: Castanopsis
- Species: C. endertii

Binomial name
- Castanopsis endertii Hatus. ex Soepadmo

Species of tree

Castanopsis endertii is a tree in the family Fagaceae. It is named for the Dutch botanist and plant collector Frederik Endert.

== Description ==
Castanopsis endertii grows as a tree up to 35 metres (110 ft) tall with a trunk diameter of up to 60 cm (24 in). The brownish bark is slightly fissured with ring-like features. The coriaceous leaves measure up to 18 cm (7 in) long. Its roundish, edible nuts measure up to 3.5 cm (1.4 in) long.

== Distribution and habitat ==
Castanopsis endertii is endemic to Borneo. Its habitat is montane forests up to 2,500 m (8,200 ft) elevation.
