= Castanopsis foxworthyi =

Scientific classification
- Kingdom: Plantae
- Clade: Tracheophytes
- Clade: Angiosperms
- Clade: Eudicots
- Clade: Rosids
- Order: Fagales
- Family: Fagaceae
- Genus: Castanopsis
- Species: C. foxworthyi

Binomial name
- Castanopsis foxworthyi Schottky

Synonyms
- Castanopsis kinabaluensis A.Camus

Species of tree

Castanopsis foxworthyi is a tree in the family Fagaceae. It is named for the botanist Frederick William Foxworthy.

== Description ==
Castanopsis foxworthyi grows as a tree up to 30 metres (100 ft) tall with a trunk diameter of up to 60 cm (24 in). The smooth bark is blackish brown. The coriaceous leaves measure up to 12 cm (5 in) long. Its ovoid nuts measure up to 2 cm (0.8 in) long.

== Distribution and habitat ==
Castanopsis foxworthyi grows naturally in Peninsular Malaysia and Borneo. Its habitat is dipterocarp, peat swamp and kerangas forests from sea-level to 2,100 m (7,000 ft) elevation.
