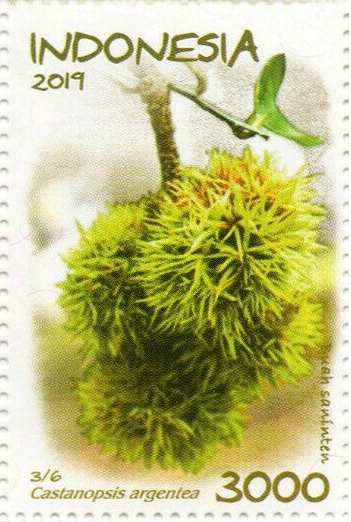
- Calybium and cupule of C. argentea

Conservation status
- Endangered (IUCN 3.1)

Scientific classification
- Kingdom: Plantae
- Clade: Tracheophytes
- Clade: Angiosperms
- Clade: Eudicots
- Clade: Rosids
- Order: Fagales
- Family: Fagaceae
- Genus: Castanopsis
- Species: C. argentea

Binomial name
- Castanopsis argentea (Blume) A.DC.

Synonyms
- Castanea argentea Blume

= Castanopsis argentea =

Species of flowering plant

Castanopsis argentea is an evergreen tree native to Indonesia, where it is known as sarangan. It is native to the islands of Java and Sumatra.

== Description ==
Castanopsis argentea is a large tree, growing from 15 to 30 meters high.

The fruits are decorated with branched spines. Each fruit cup contains one to four edible nuts that are oval or flattened and have a size of up to 2.5 cm (0.98 in). The fruit stalk is up to 1.5 cm (0.59 in) long. Flowering occurs most of the year, but usually from March to April. The fruit ripens from February to November, usually May to July.

== Distribution and habitat ==
Castanopsis argentea grows in lowland forests and lower montane forests on Java and Sumatra, from 150 to 1,400 meters elevation. It is mostly found in undisturbed forests of West Java around Mount Gede and Mount Halimun, with a density of ca. 12 trees/hectare. It also occurs in national parks, nature reserves and in high elevation forests in other areas of Java. It is almost extinct from lowland areas in Sumatra, due to the clearance of the land for palm oil plantations.

Plants of the World Online describes a broader range for this species, from Assam in eastern India through Myanmar and Thailand, as well as on Sumatra, Java, and Borneo.
