= Castanopsis densinervia =

Conservation status
- Least Concern (IUCN 3.1)

Scientific classification
- Kingdom: Plantae
- Clade: Tracheophytes
- Clade: Angiosperms
- Clade: Eudicots
- Clade: Rosids
- Order: Fagales
- Family: Fagaceae
- Genus: Castanopsis
- Species: C. densinervia

Binomial name
- Castanopsis densinervia Soepadmo

Species of tree

Castanopsis densinervia is a tree in the family Fagaceae. The specific epithet densinervia is from the Latin meaning 'dense nerves', referring to the leaf venation.

== Description ==
Castanopsis densinervia grows as a tree up to 30 metres (100 ft) tall with a trunk diameter of up to 50 cm (20 in). The greyish bark is smooth. The coriaceous leaves measure up to 12.5 cm (5 in) long. Its ovoid nuts measure up to 3.5 cm (1.4 in) long.

== Distribution and habitat ==
Castanopsis densinervia is endemic to Borneo. Its habitat is hill dipterocarp to lower montane forests from 1,000 m (3,300 ft) to 1,800 m (6,000 ft) elevation.
