= Castanopsis borneensis =

Conservation status
- Least Concern (IUCN 3.1)

Scientific classification
- Kingdom: Plantae
- Clade: Tracheophytes
- Clade: Angiosperms
- Clade: Eudicots
- Clade: Rosids
- Order: Fagales
- Family: Fagaceae
- Genus: Castanopsis
- Species: C. borneensis

Binomial name
- Castanopsis borneensis King

Species of tree

Castanopsis borneensis is a species of tree in the family Fagaceae. The specific epithet borneensis is from the Latin, meaning 'of Borneo'.

== Description ==
Castanopsis borneensis grows as a tree up to 20 metres (70 ft) tall with a trunk diameter of up to 30 cm (12 in). The bark is smooth or fissured. The coriaceous leaves measure up to 11 cm (4 in) long. Its ovoid nuts measure up to 2 cm (0.8 in) long.

== Distribution and habitat ==
Castanopsis borneensis is endemic to Borneo. Its habitat is lowland dipterocarp and kerangas forests, to 200 m (700 ft) altitude.
