= Castanopsis paucispina =

Conservation status
- Least Concern (IUCN 3.1)

Scientific classification
- Kingdom: Plantae
- Clade: Tracheophytes
- Clade: Angiosperms
- Clade: Eudicots
- Clade: Rosids
- Order: Fagales
- Family: Fagaceae
- Genus: Castanopsis
- Species: C. paucispina

Binomial name
- Castanopsis paucispina Soepadmo (1968)

Species of tree

Castanopsis paucispina is a tree in the family Fagaceae. The specific epithet paucispina means 'few spines', referring to the sparsely spined cupule.

== Description ==
Castanopsis paucispina grows as a tree up to 30 m (100 ft) tall with a trunk diameter of up to 60 cm (24 in). The brown bark is smooth to slightly cracked. The coriaceous leaves measure up to 14 cm (6 in) long. Its obovoid to roundish nuts measure up to 4 cm (1.6 in) long.

== Distribution and habitat ==
Castanopsis paucispina is endemic to Borneo. Its habitat is hill dipterocarp forests up to 1,100 m (3,600 ft) elevation.
