= Castanopsis pierrei =

Conservation status
- Least Concern (IUCN 3.1)

Scientific classification
- Kingdom: Plantae
- Clade: Tracheophytes
- Clade: Angiosperms
- Clade: Eudicots
- Clade: Rosids
- Order: Fagales
- Family: Fagaceae
- Genus: Castanopsis
- Species: C. pierrei

Binomial name
- Castanopsis pierrei Hance

Species of tree

The tree Castanopsis pierrei is in the family Fagaceae. It is found in Thailand and Cambodia. It provides fuel, food and crop-shading.

== Description ==
A shrub, or small tree, growing some 5-10m tall. It has leaves with an entire margin, and spiny capsules. The capsules have 1 to 3 nuts each, with the acorn measuring some 3–5 cm.

== Habitat ==
C. pierrei occurs in open formations at low elevations, below 200m. In Thailand it also grows at low altitude, below 100m, in evergreen forest, often near streams. It is found in Northeastern, Southeastern and Peninsular Thailand. In Northern Thailand it is found growing in natural hillside evergreen forest. In Cambodia it is especially common in Siem Reap and Preah Vihear provinces. It also occurs besides roads in Phnom Penh. In the southern Cardamon Mountains and the Botum-Sakor peninsula, the tree occurs in both the short and tall Evergreen sandstone forest. The major timber-extraction forest type, the tall forest occurs on more fertile and clay-rich soils of hill slopes from 10 to 600m elevations. Mixed within the tall forest, with sharp boundaries at times, sometimes gradational, the short evergreen sandstone forest is found on shallow or poor soils, such as the thin soils over sandstone rock, pebble layers, or deep sand soil with a thin humus layer.

== Vernacular names ==
In Cambodia it is known as khaôhs ba:y kriëm (khaôhs="oak", ba:y kriëm="rice-crust", Khmer).

== Uses ==
In Northern Thailand, the tree is used to shade crops in the shifting fallow agriculture of the area, and it provides firewood. The floury fruits, cooked under ashes, are appreciated in Cambodia and the wood is regarded as a good firewood.
