= Castanopsis psilophylla =

Scientific classification
- Kingdom: Plantae
- Clade: Tracheophytes
- Clade: Angiosperms
- Clade: Eudicots
- Clade: Rosids
- Order: Fagales
- Family: Fagaceae
- Genus: Castanopsis
- Species: C. psilophylla

Binomial name
- Castanopsis psilophylla Soepadmo

Species of tree

Castanopsis psilophylla is a tree in the family Fagaceae. The specific epithet psilophylla means 'smooth leaves'.

== Description ==
Castanopsis psilophylla grows as a tree up to 30 metres (100 ft) tall with a trunk diameter of up to 50 cm (20 in). The brown bark is smooth or with fine fissures. The coriaceous leaves measure up to 15 cm (6 in) long. Its ovoid nuts measure up to 2 cm (0.8 in) long and are considered edible.

== Distribution and habitat ==
Castanopsis psilophylla grows naturally in Borneo and the Philippines. Its habitat is hill dipterocarp forests up to 1,000 m (3,300 ft) elevation.
