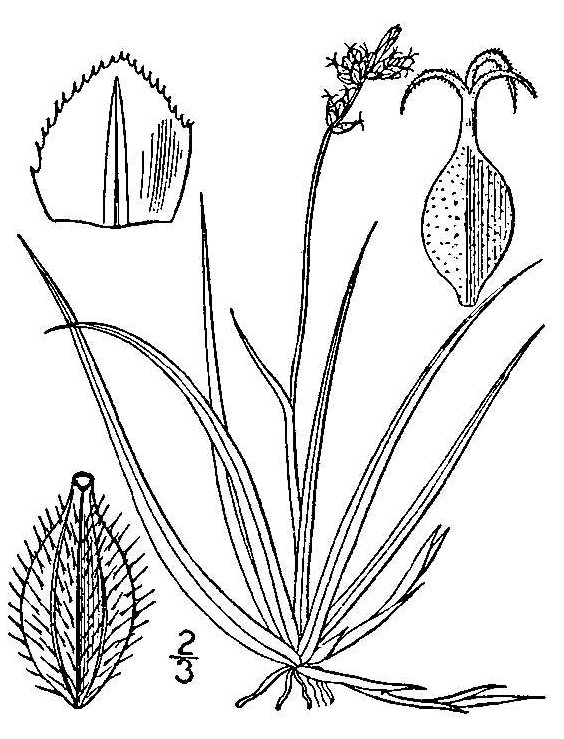

Conservation status
- Secure (NatureServe)

Scientific classification
- Kingdom: Plantae
- Clade: Tracheophytes
- Clade: Angiosperms
- Clade: Monocots
- Clade: Commelinids
- Order: Poales
- Family: Cyperaceae
- Genus: Carex
- Species: C. concinna

Binomial name
- Carex concinna R.Br.

= Carex concinna =

Species of grass-like plant

Carex concinna is a species of sedge known by the common names low northern sedge, northern elegant sedge, beauty sedge, and beautiful sedge. It is native to northern North America, where it occurs across Canada and in high elevations in the northern contiguous United States.

This sedge produces loose or dense clumps of triangular stems up to about 20 centimeters tall. There are a few light green leaves around the bases of the stems, each measuring up to 10 centimeters long but just a few millimeters wide. The inflorescences grow at the top and from the sides of the stems. The terminal spike is made up of staminate flowers. Each is under a centimeter long. The plant reproduces by seed and by sprouting from its rhizome.

This plant grows in forests and wooded areas, often on calcareous substrates. It is common on the edges of flood channels. It occurs in the alvars around the Great Lakes along with other sedges such as spikerush (Eleocharis elliptica), ebony sedge (Carex eburnea), Richardson’s sedge (Carex richardsonii), and bulrush sedge (C. scirpoidea).
