= Castanopsis catappifolia =

Conservation status
- Critically Endangered (IUCN 2.3)

Scientific classification
- Kingdom: Plantae
- Clade: Tracheophytes
- Clade: Angiosperms
- Clade: Eudicots
- Clade: Rosids
- Order: Fagales
- Family: Fagaceae
- Genus: Castanopsis
- Species: C. catappifolia

Binomial name
- Castanopsis catappifolia King ex Hook.f.

Species of tree

Castanopsis catappifolia is a species of plant in the family Fagaceae. It is a tree endemic to Peninsular Malaysia. It is threatened by habitat loss.
