= Castanopsis tribuloides =

Conservation status
- Least Concern (IUCN 3.1)

Scientific classification
- Kingdom: Plantae
- Clade: Tracheophytes
- Clade: Angiosperms
- Clade: Eudicots
- Clade: Rosids
- Order: Fagales
- Family: Fagaceae
- Genus: Castanopsis
- Species: C. tribuloides

Binomial name
- Castanopsis tribuloides (Sm.) A.DC.

Synonyms
- List: Balanoplis tribuloides Raf.; Castanea microcarpa Lindl. ex Wall.; Castanea tribuloides (Sm.) Lindl.; Quercus acuta Buch.-Ham. ex Wall.; Quercus armata D.Don; Quercus caudata Lindl. ex Wall.; Quercus loureiroi Hance; Quercus tribuloides Sm.

Species of flowering plant

Castanopsis tribuloides is a species of flowering plant in the beech family Fagaceae, native to the Himayalas and higher areas of mainland Southeast Asia. In Vietnam it is cultivated for its edible nuts, and in India it is coppiced for firewood.
