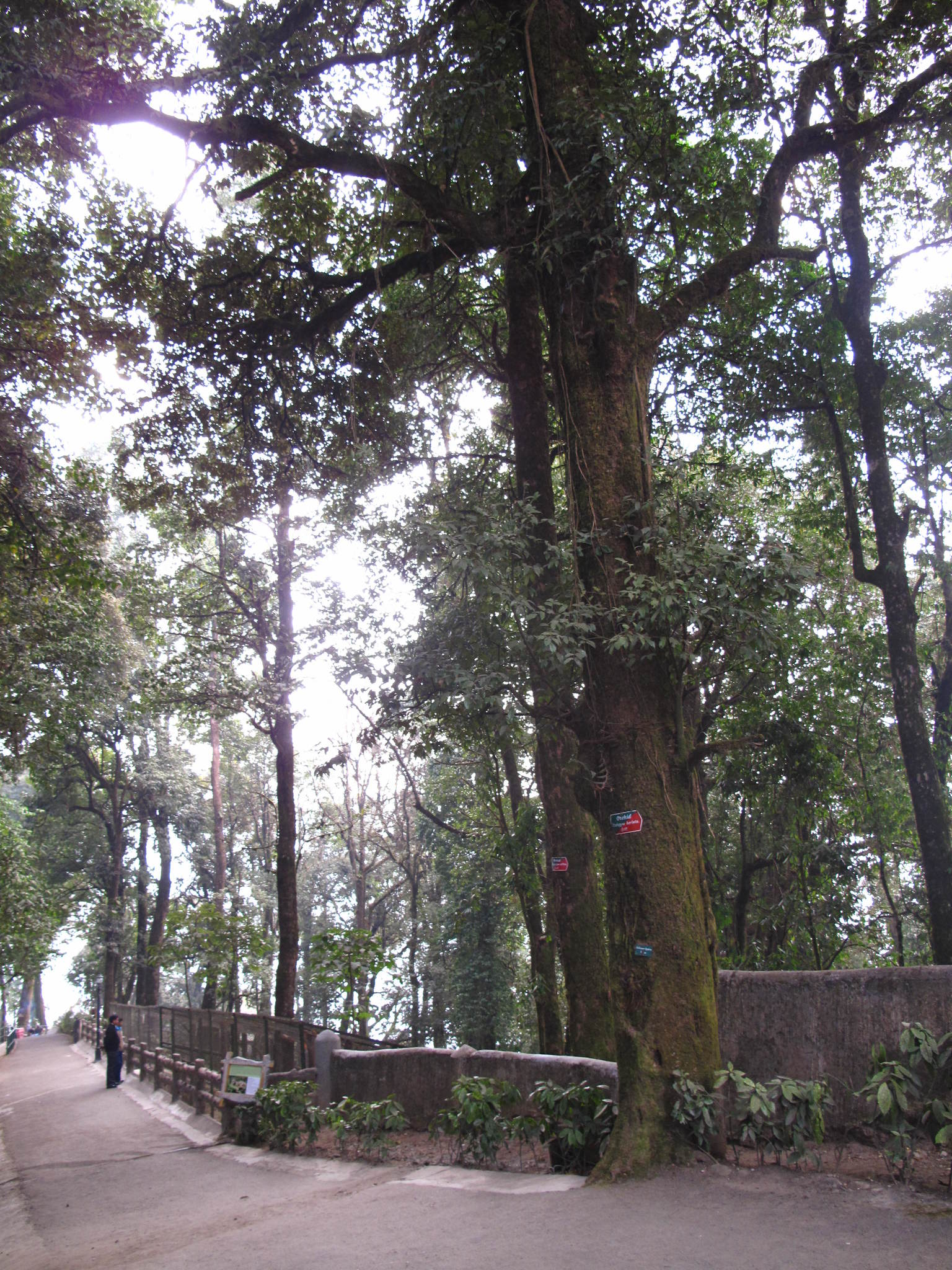
- In Darjeeling, India

Conservation status
- Least Concern (IUCN 3.1)

Scientific classification
- Kingdom: Plantae
- Clade: Tracheophytes
- Clade: Angiosperms
- Clade: Eudicots
- Clade: Rosids
- Order: Fagales
- Family: Fagaceae
- Genus: Castanopsis
- Species: C. purpurella

Binomial name
- Castanopsis purpurella (Miq.) N.P.Balakr.

Subspecies
- Castanopsis purpurella subsp. laotica (Hickel & A.Camus) Govaerts; Castanopsis purpurella subsp. purpurella

Synonyms
- Castanea purpurella Miq.; Synonyms of subsp. laotica: Castanopsis hystrix subsp. laotica (Hickel & A.Camus) A.Camus; Castanopsis laotica Hickel & A.Camus; Synonyms of subsp. purpurella: Castanea bodinieri H.Lév. & Vaniot; Castanea hystrix Hook.f. & Thomson ex Miq.; Castanopsis bodinieri (H.Lév. & Vaniot) Koidz.; Castanopsis hystrix Miq.; Castanopsis lohfauensis Hu; Castanopsis tapuensis Hu; Quercus brunnea H.Lév.

= Castanopsis purpurella =

Species of tree

Castanopsis purpurella, or Patle katus, is a species of evergreen broadleaf tree which grows up to 30 meters in height.

The tree is found in subtropical broadleaved evergreen forests, ranging from the eastern Himalayas of Nepal, Bhutan, and northeastern India, across Indochina (Cambodia, Laos, Myanmar, Thailand, Vietnam), southern China (Fujian, Guangdong, Guangxi, Guizhou, Hainan, southwestern Hunan, southeastern Tibet, and southern Yunnan), and Taiwan. It ranges up to 2400 meters elevation in the Himalayas, and up to 1600 meters elevation in southern China. It thrives in moist soils, and is often found in association with trees of family Lauraceae.
