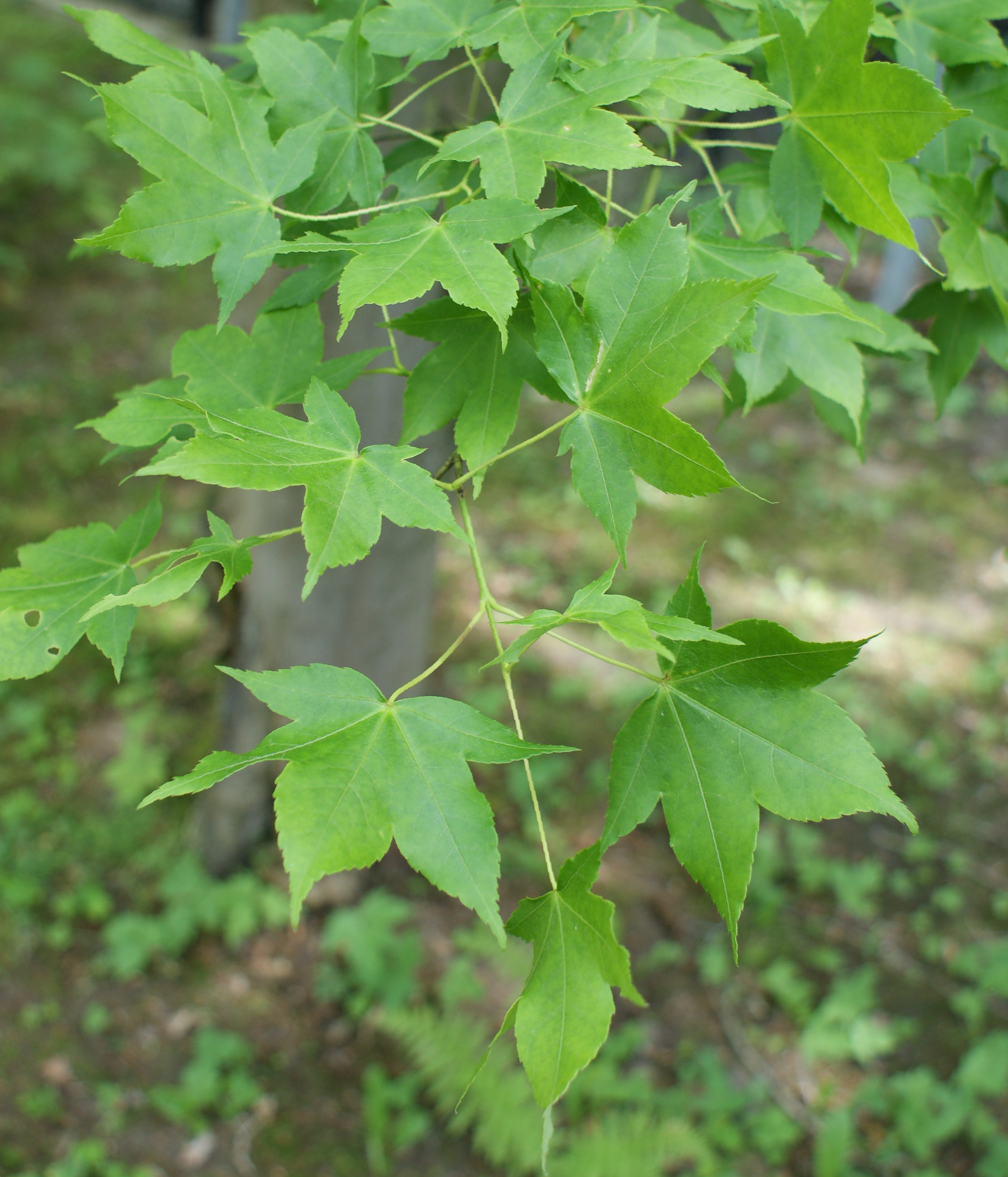

Scientific classification
- Kingdom: Plantae
- Clade: Tracheophytes
- Clade: Angiosperms
- Clade: Eudicots
- Clade: Rosids
- Order: Sapindales
- Family: Sapindaceae
- Genus: Acer
- Section: Acer sect. Palmata
- Series: Acer ser. Palmata
- Species: A. oliverianum

Binomial name
- Acer oliverianum Pax 1889

Synonyms
- Acer serrulatum Hayata

= Acer oliverianum =

Species of maple

Acer oliverianum, common names Oliver's maple and Oliver maple, is broadleaf deciduous tree. It is a species of maple.

== Description ==
Acer oliverianum has a smooth bark that is jade green in colour, with fine white waxy stripes. It grows up to 20 meters wilderness areas of Taiwan but usually only grows to 5 to 8 meters when cultivated. It has more or less horizontal branches, and looks similar to Acer palmatum the Japanese Maple.

The leaves are opposite and simple being 6 to 10 cm across, with base truncate or cordate. The leaves are 5-lobed and palmate. The lobes are ovate, the middle lobe having 5 to 8 pairs of lateral veins with minor veins finely reticulate.

The flowers are whitish with five purplish sepal. They have five white petals and eight stamen that are longer than the petals.

The fruit are glabrous ranging from 2.5 to 3 cm long that spread at a wide angle.

== Distribution ==
Acer oliverianum is found in forests and valleys at elevations of 1000 to 2000 metres. It has been found only in Taiwan and China, in the provinces of Anhui, Fujian, southern Gansu, Guizhou, Henan, Hubei, Hunan, Jiangxi, Shaanxi, Sichuan, Yunnan, and Zhejiang.

== Gallery ==
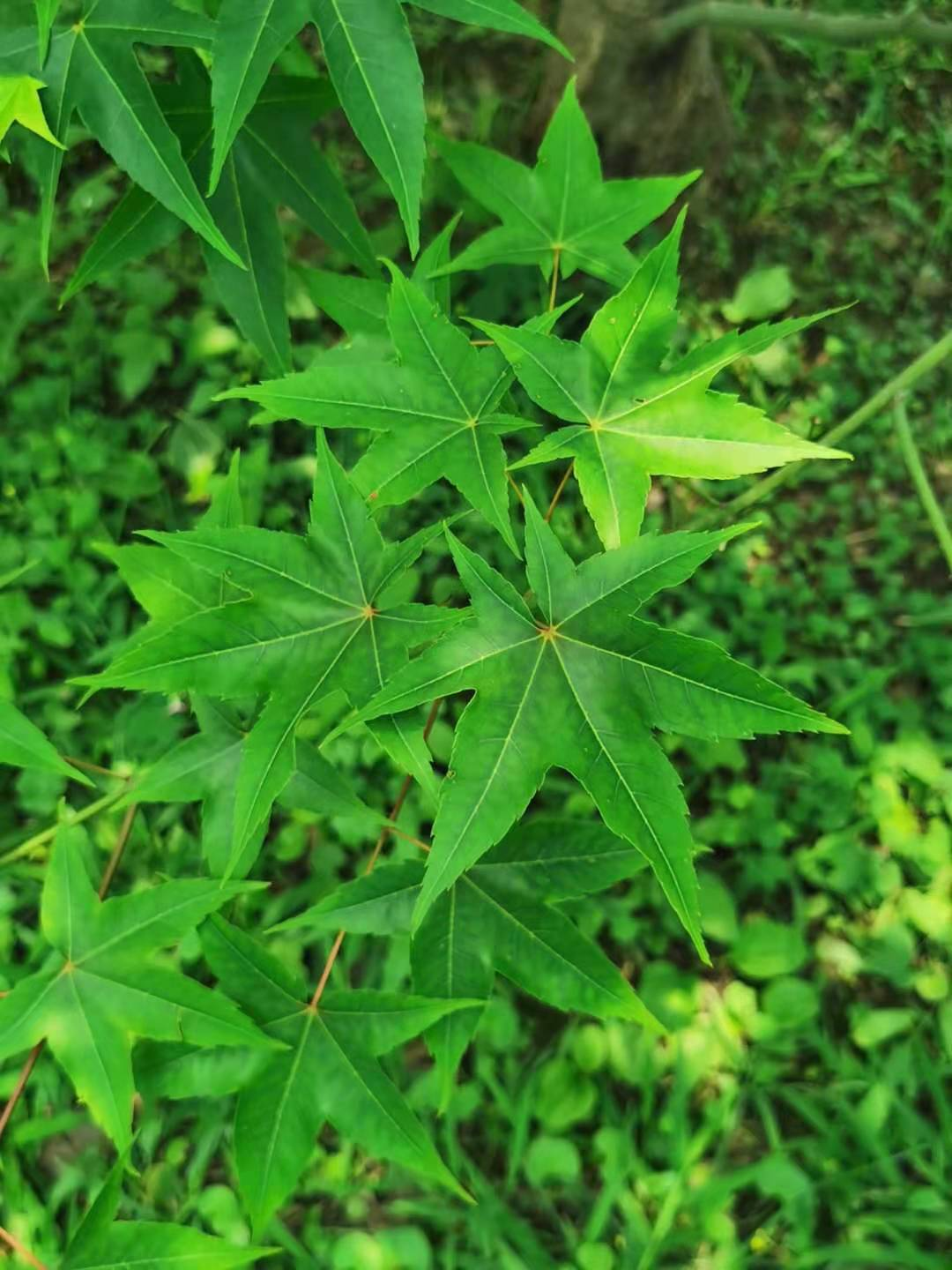
Leaves palmate 6-lobed and 7-lobed, less common (palmate 5-lobed most common).

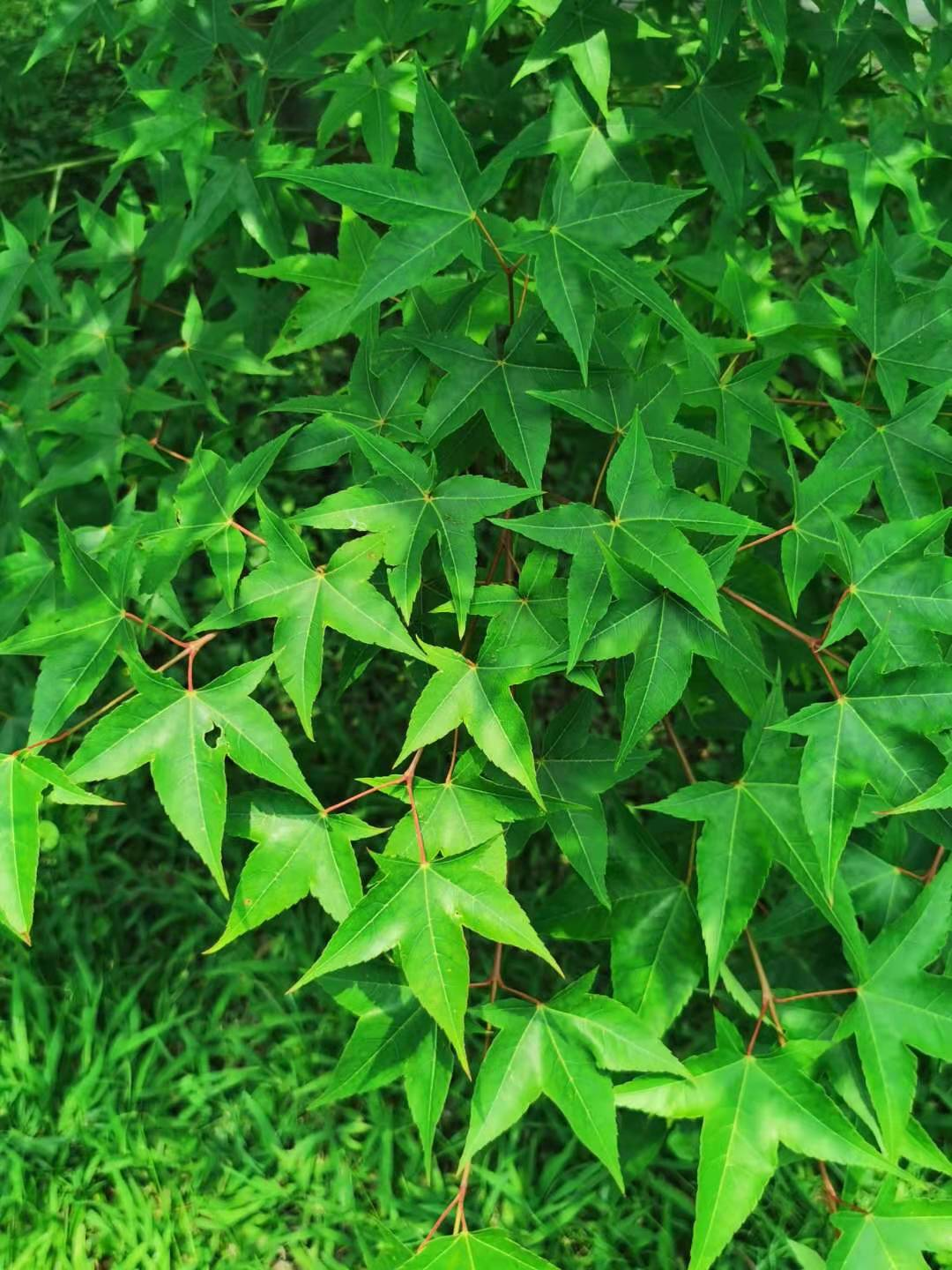
The petioles of the new leaves and the new branches are red.

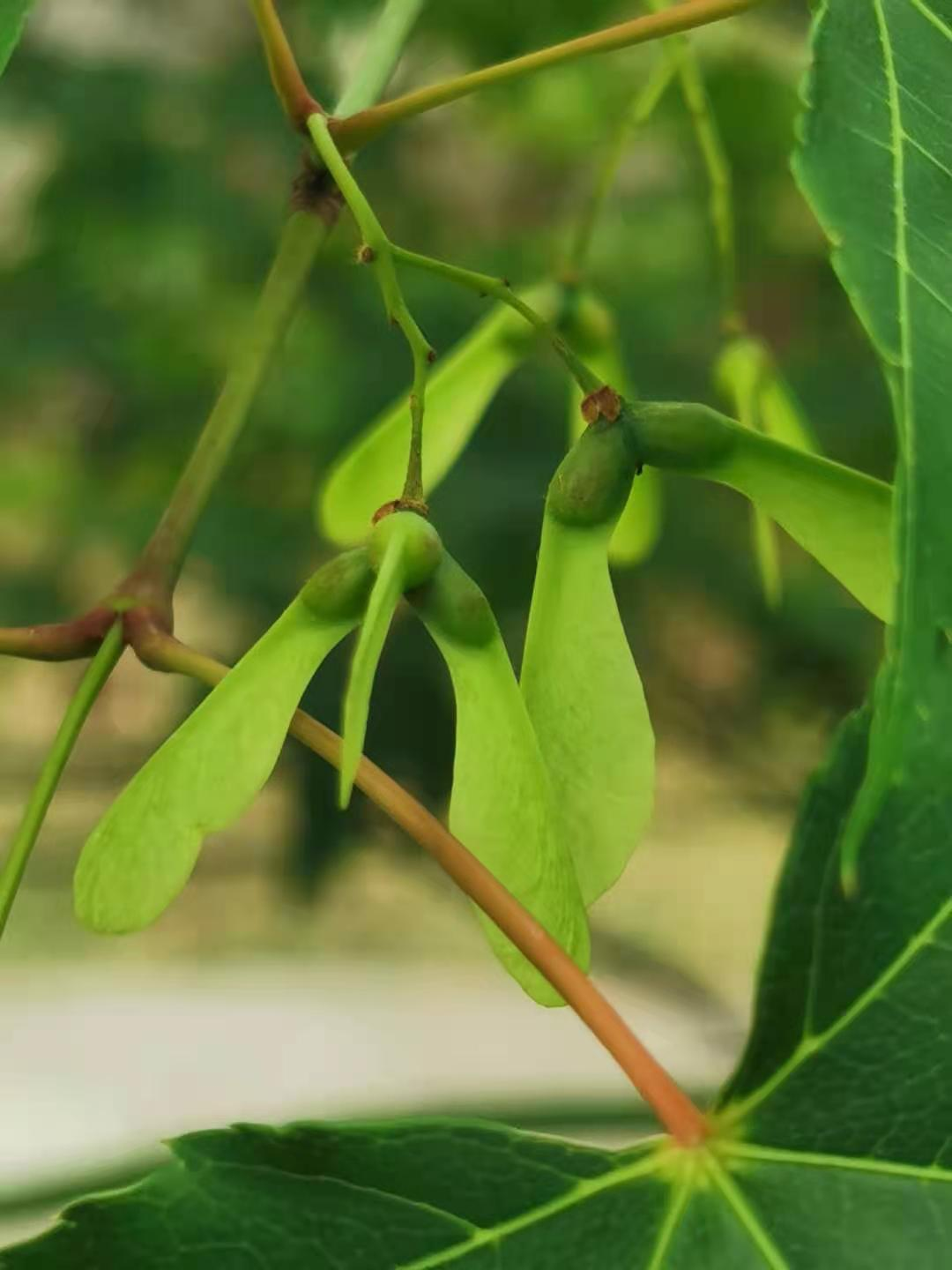
The fruit is diptera but there are exceptions.

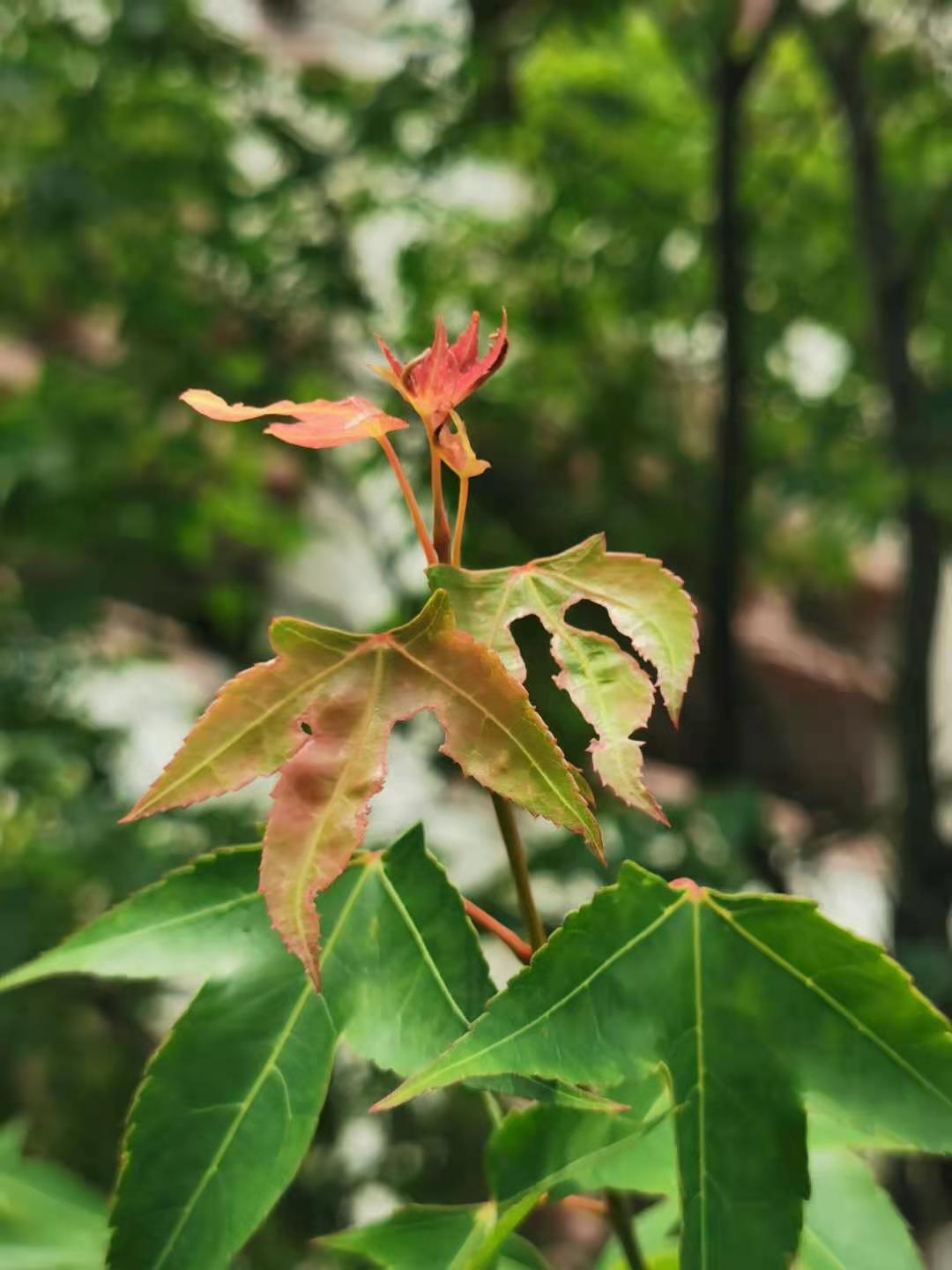
New leaves.

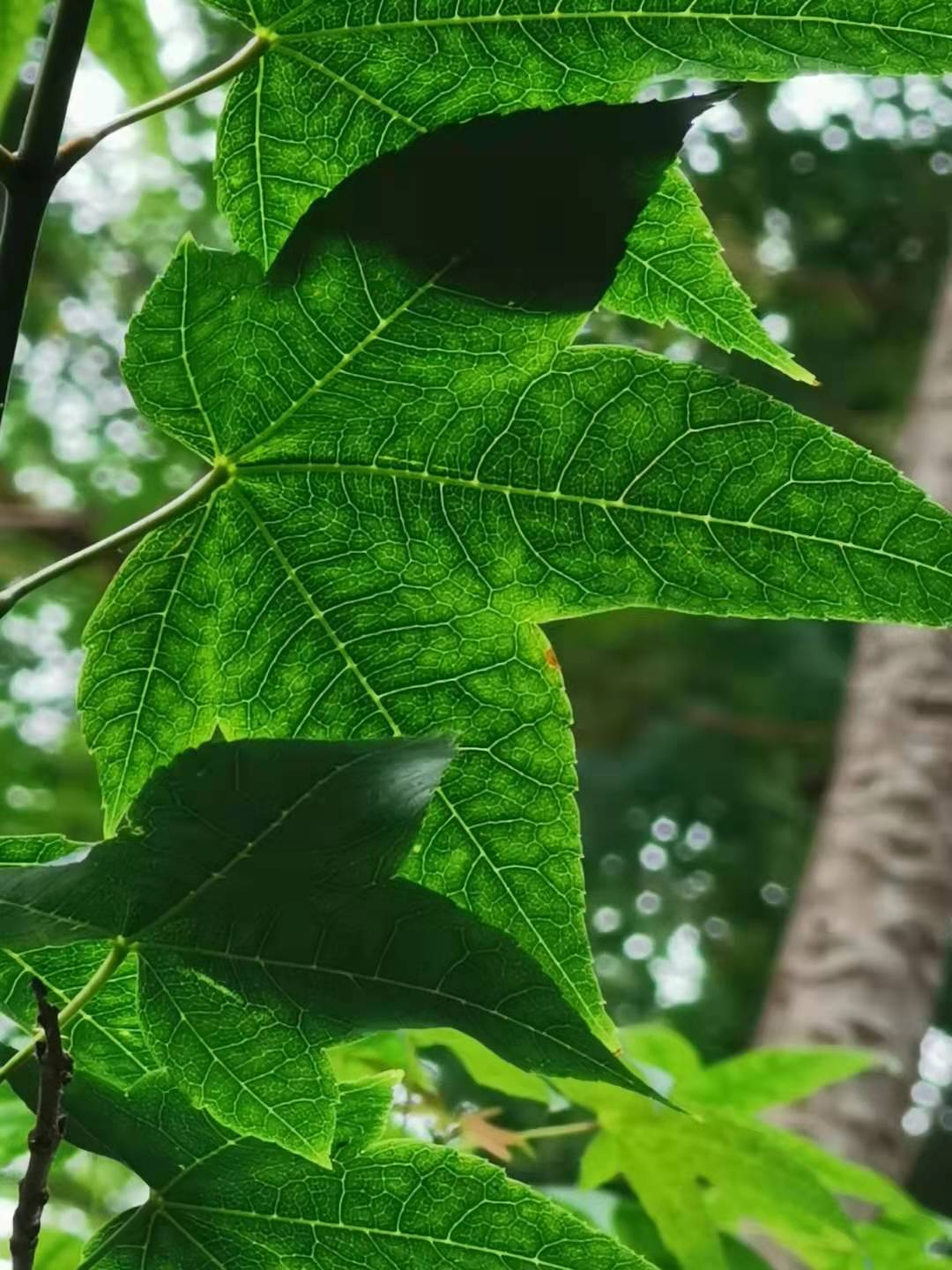
Vein.

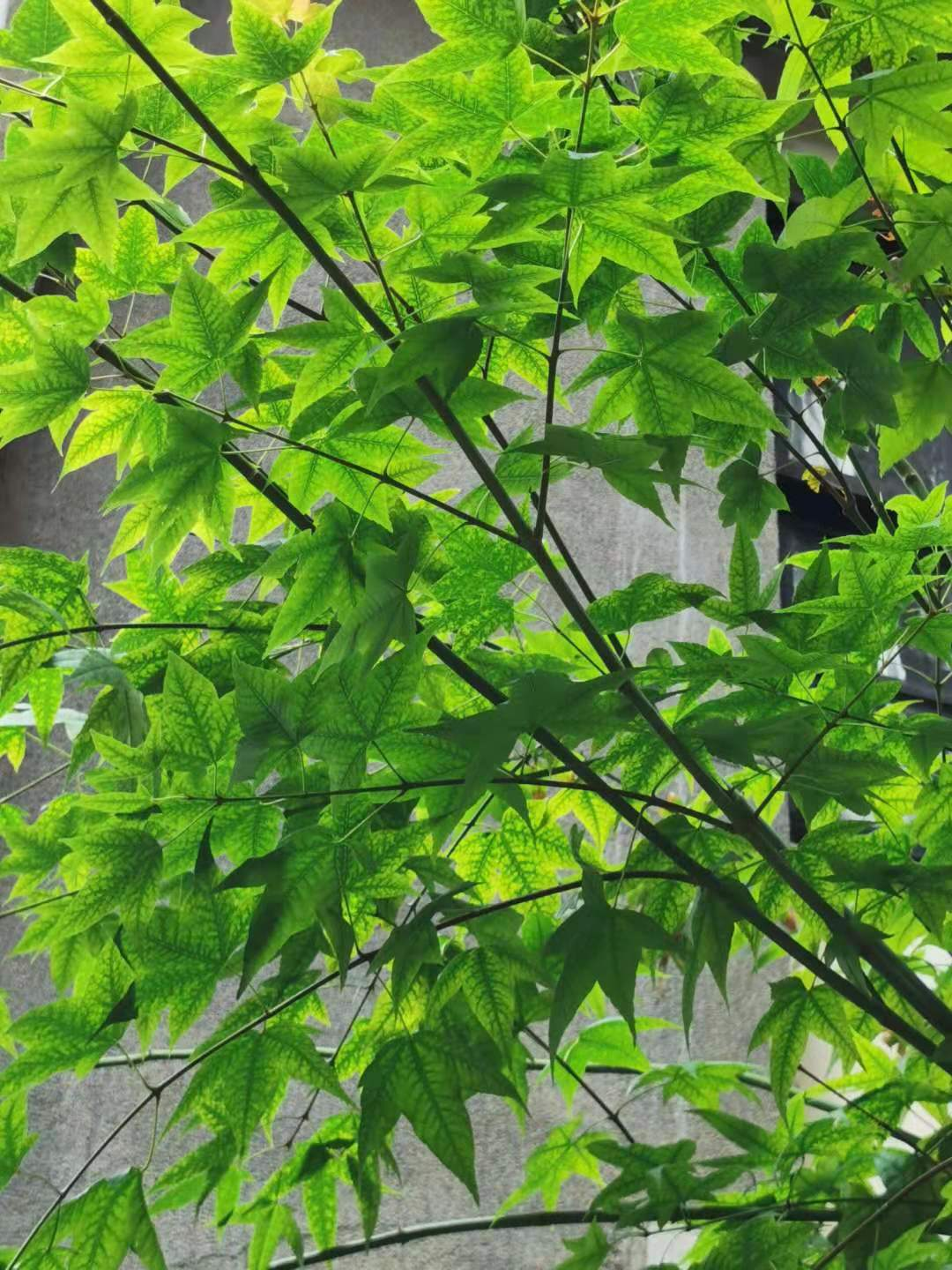
Branches and leaves.

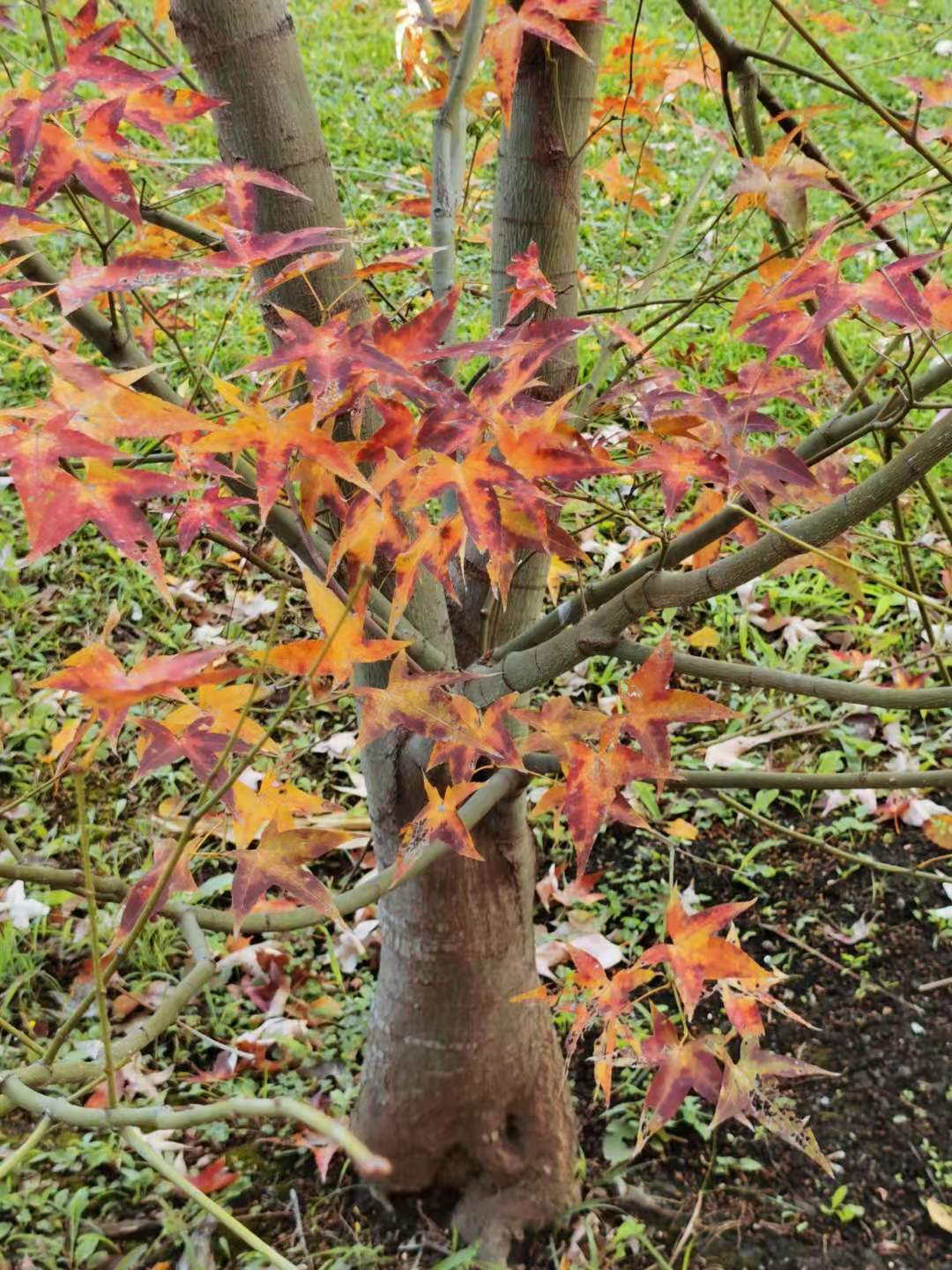
The leaves change color in the fall when the temperature drops.

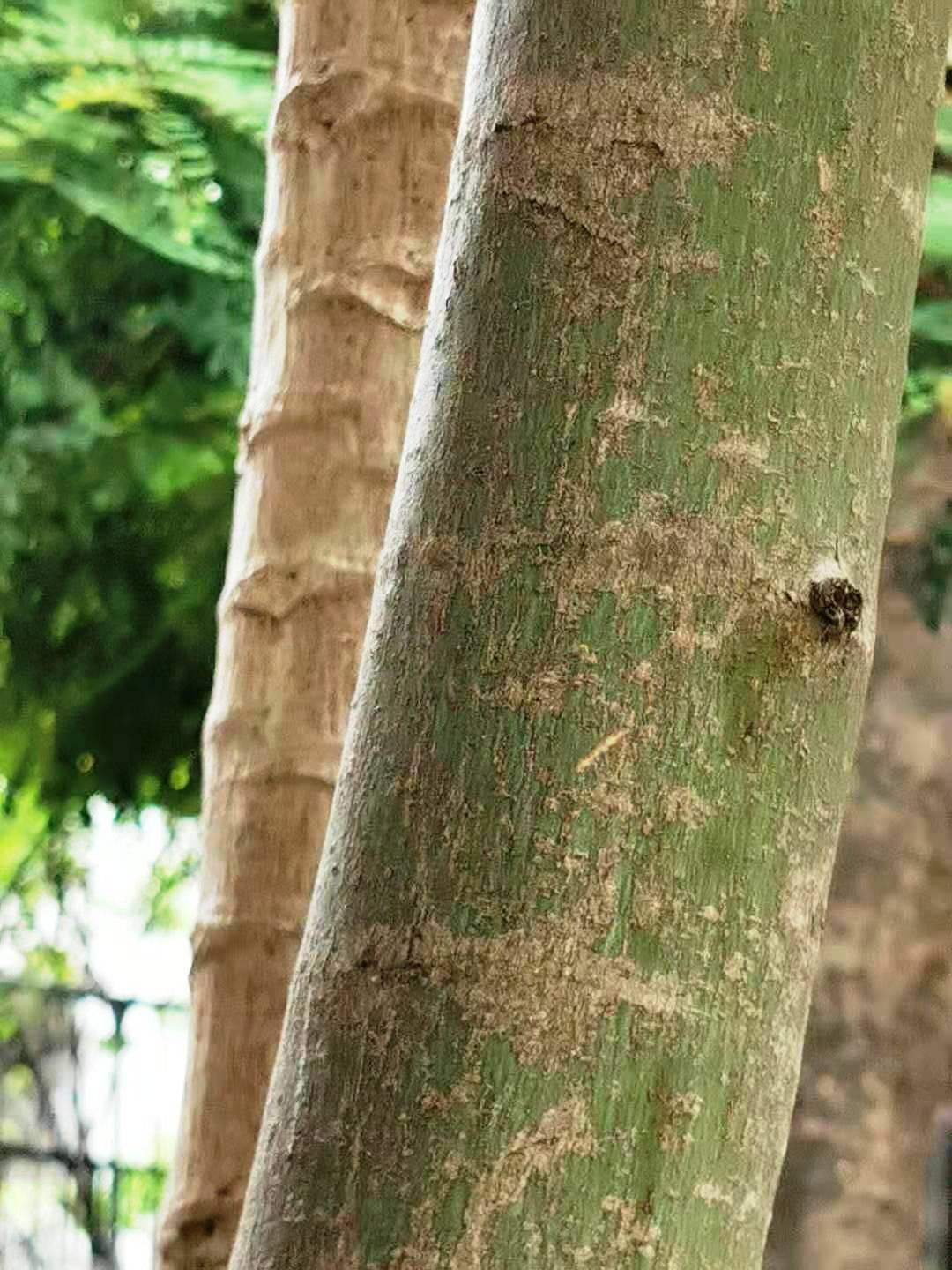
The Chinese name "Qingfeng" comes from the bark color of the new branches and young trunk which are green.
