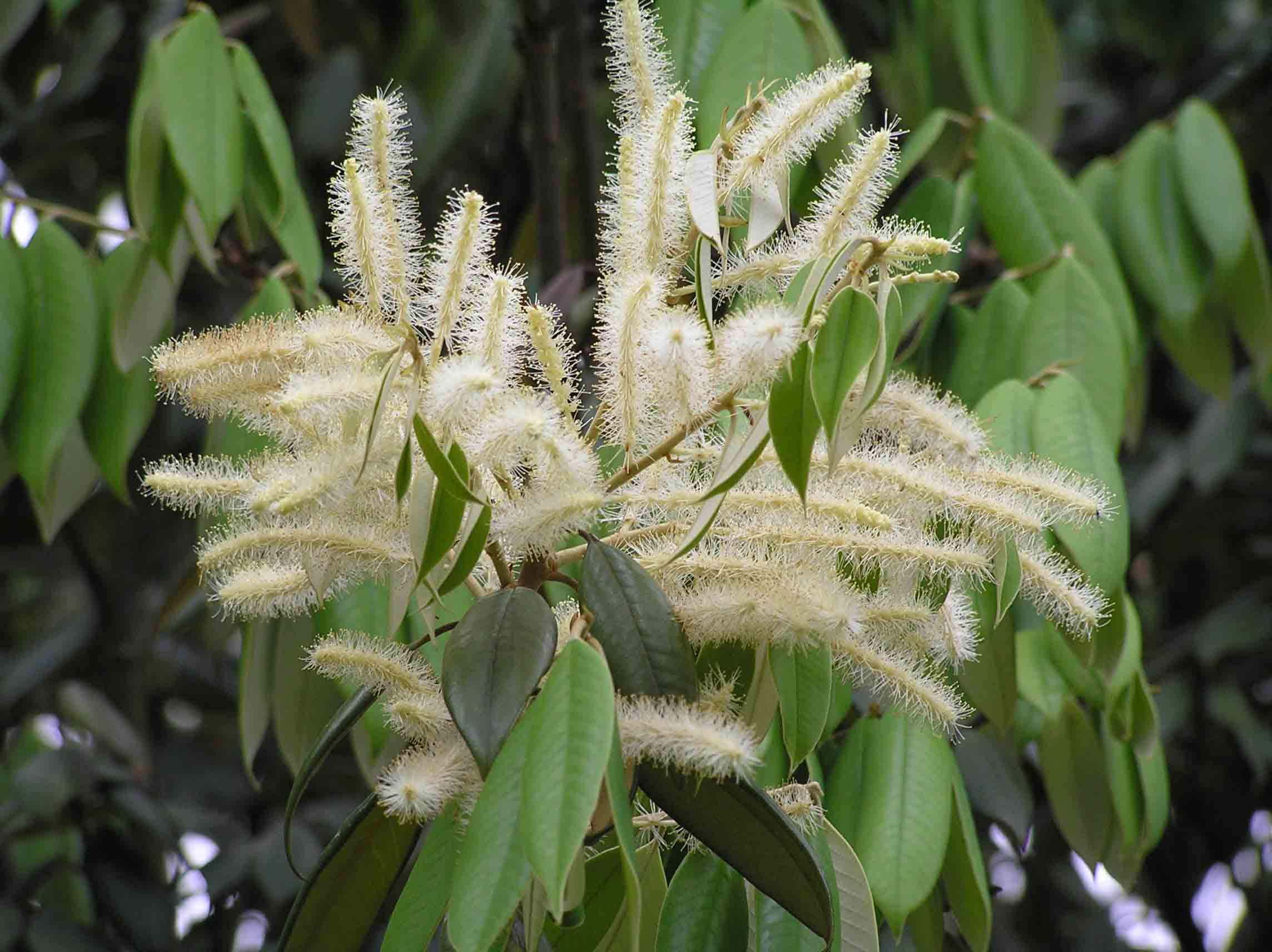

Conservation status
- Vulnerable (IUCN 2.3)

Scientific classification
- Kingdom: Plantae
- Clade: Tracheophytes
- Clade: Angiosperms
- Clade: Eudicots
- Clade: Rosids
- Order: Fagales
- Family: Fagaceae
- Genus: Castanopsis
- Species: C. concinna

Binomial name
- Castanopsis concinna (Champ. ex Benth.) A.DC.

Synonyms
- Castanea concinna Champ. ex Benth.; Castanopsis oblongifolia W.C.Cheng & C.S.Chao

= Castanopsis concinna =

Species of tree

Castanopsis concinna is a species of plant in the family Fagaceae. It is a tree found in broad-leaved evergreen forests of southern Guangdong and Guangxi in China and in Hong Kong. It is under second-class national protection in China. It is threatened by habitat loss.
