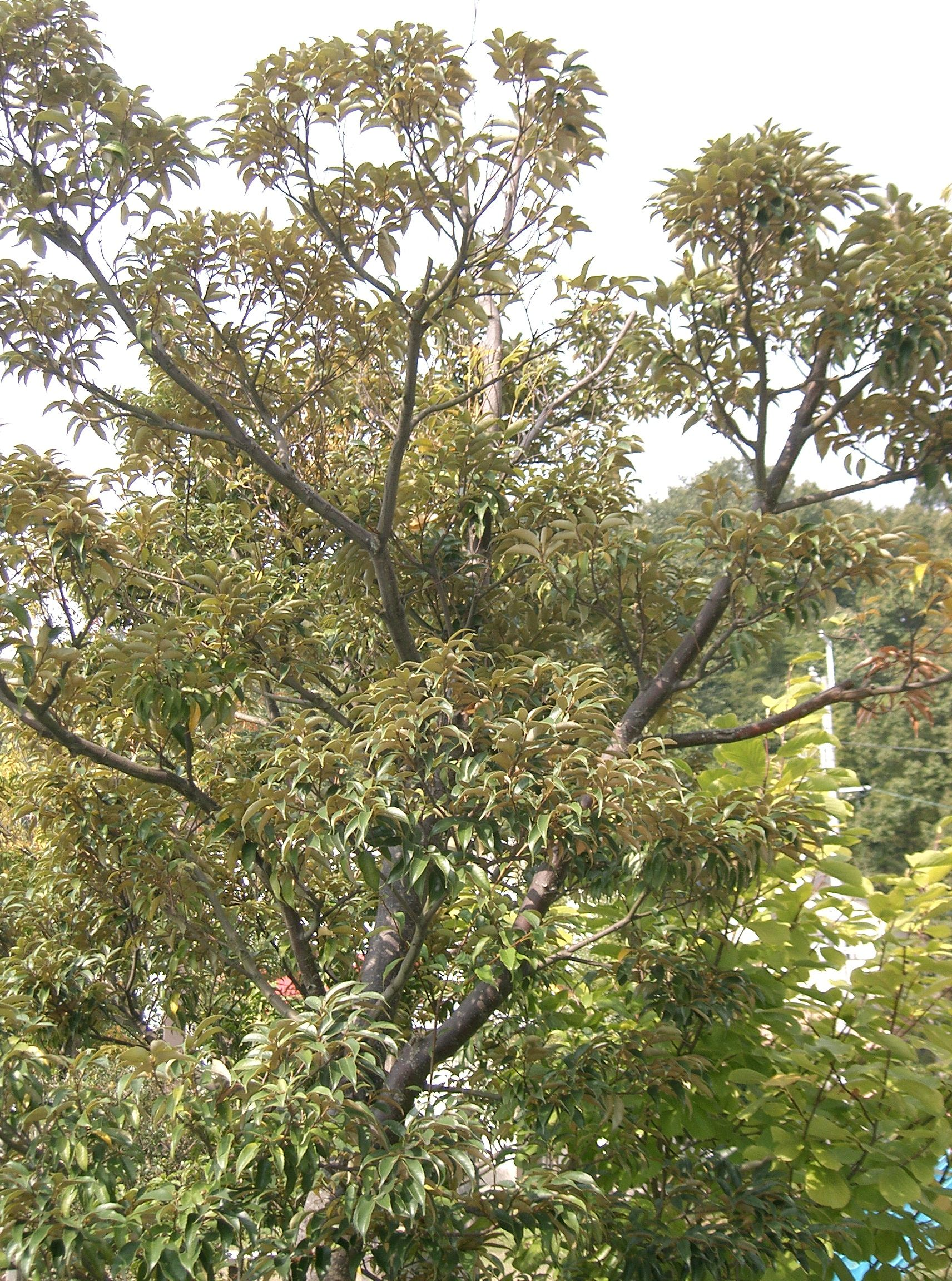
- Castanopsis sieboldii
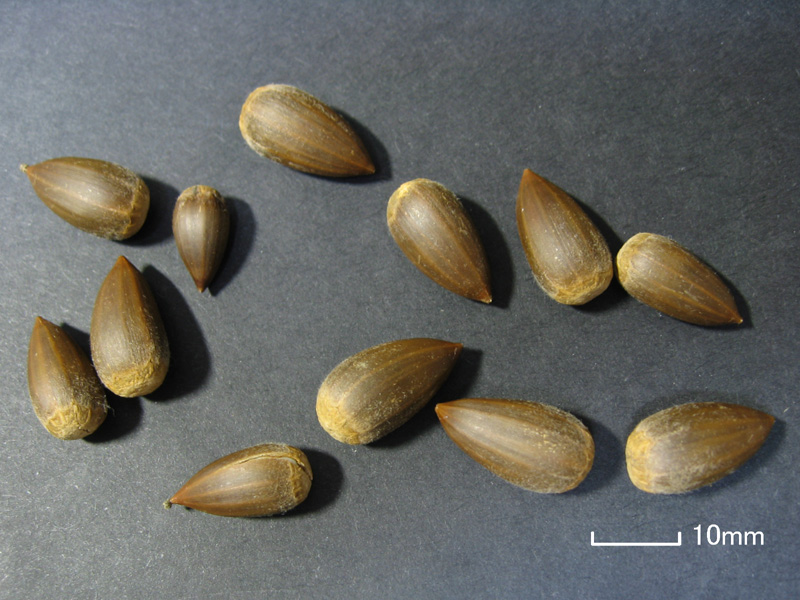
- Calybia (nuts) of Castanopsis sieboldii

Scientific classification
- Kingdom: Plantae
- Clade: Tracheophytes
- Clade: Angiosperms
- Clade: Eudicots
- Clade: Rosids
- Order: Fagales
- Family: Fagaceae
- Subfamily: Quercoideae
- Genus: Castanopsis (D. Don) Spach, 1841

Species
- About 140; see text

Synonyms
- Limlia Masamune & Tomiya; Pasaniopsis Kudo; Shiia Makino and see text

= Castanopsis =

Castanopsis Temporal range: Eocene to Present 52–0 Ma

Genus of flowering plants

Castanopsis, commonly called chinquapin or chinkapin, is a genus of evergreen trees belonging to the beech family, Fagaceae. The genus contains about 140 species, which are today restricted to tropical and subtropical eastern Asia. The English name chinkapin is shared with other related plants, including the golden chinkapins of the Pacific Northwest, which are sometimes included within Castanopsis but are more often considered a separate but very closely related genus, Chrysolepis.

== Description ==
They show many characters typical of Fagaceae. They are at least large shrubs but some species grow into sizeable trees. Their leaves are usually tough and much sclerotized and have a well-developed cuticula. Their flowers are unisexual, and the male ones are borne in erect catkins. The epigynous female flowers produce a single seed each but are congregated in small clusters. The fruit is a calybium, the kind of encased nut typical of Fagaceae. The calybium (nut) resembles a pointed acorn; the cupule (casing) is hard like that of beechnuts and spiny like that of chestnuts. Three thickened ridges run the length of the calybium's shell.

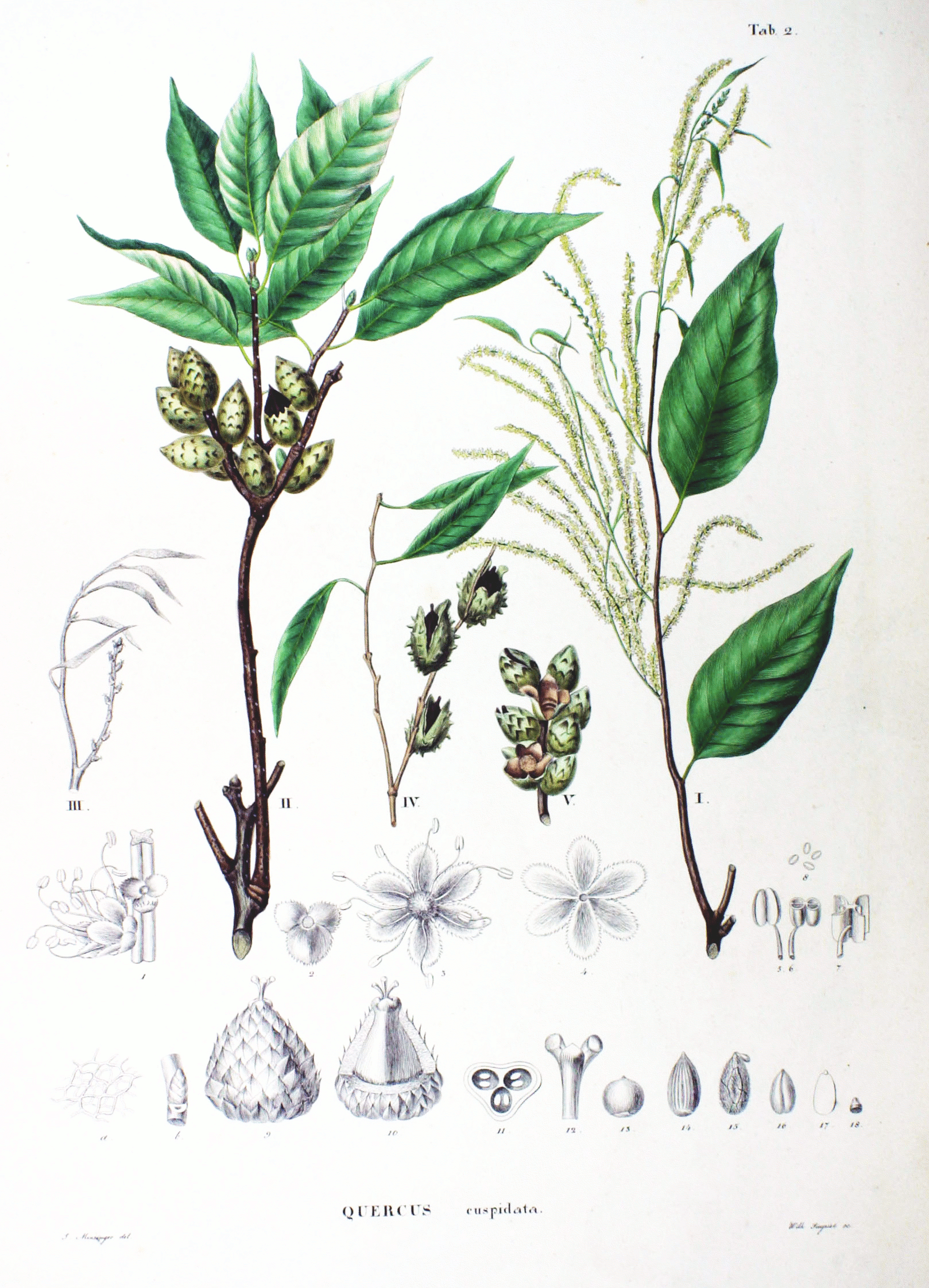
Castanopsis cuspidata

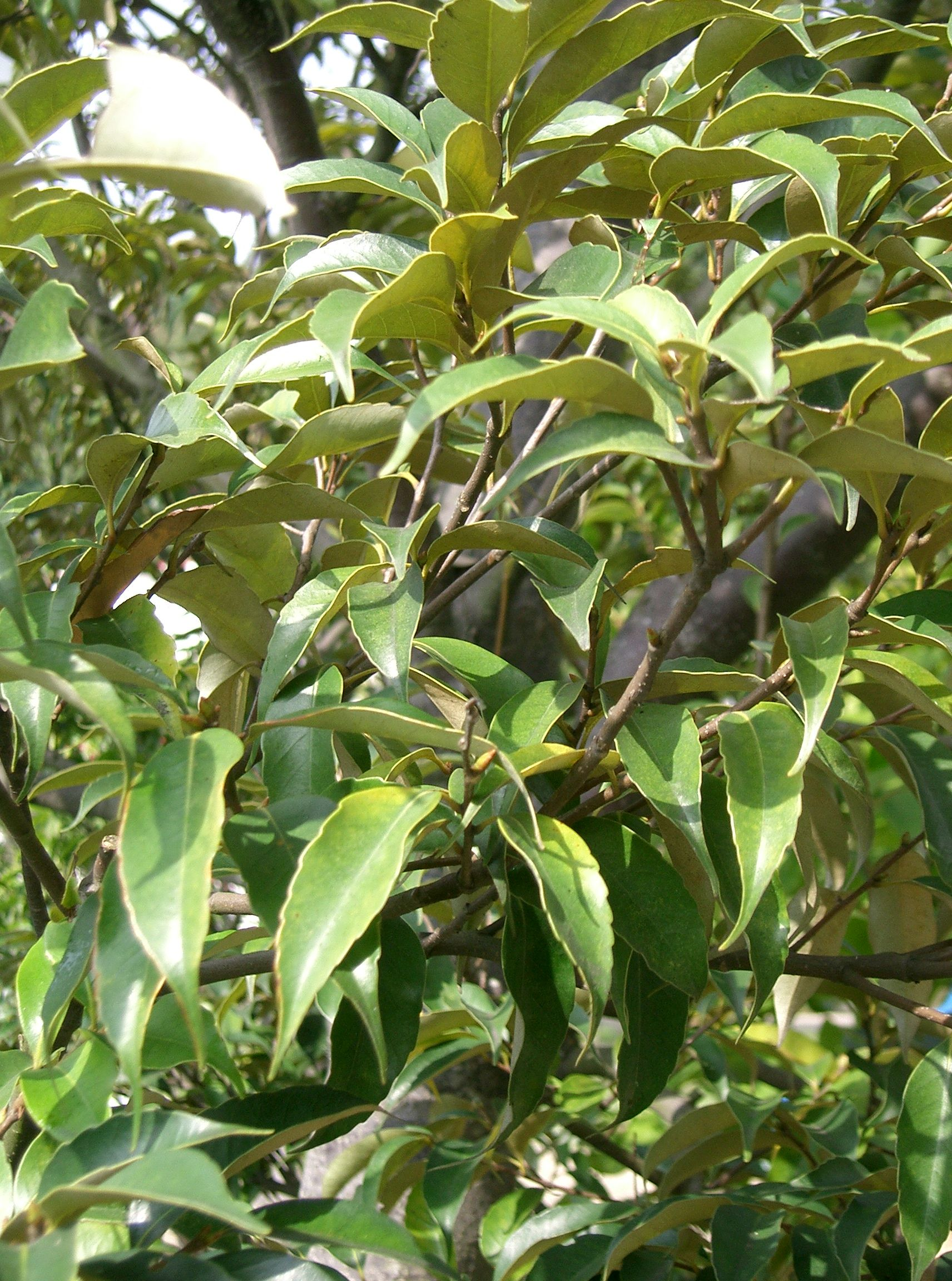
C. sieboldii leaves

== Species ==
The genus contains about 140 species.

=== Formerly placed here ===
- Castanea henryi (Skan) Rehder & E. H. Wilson (as C. henryi Skan)
- Chrysolepis

=== Fossil record ===
Fossil species known from Miocene Europe are:

- Castanopsis pyramidata (Menzel) Kirchheimer
- Castanopsis salinarum (Unger) Kirchheimer
- Castanopsis schmidtiana (Geinitz) Kräusel

These are known and identifiable from their fruit. It is not entirely clear if they belong here or into Chrysolepis, but the pattern of biogeography - with the two genera being most diverse around the Pacific but absent from North America east of the Rocky Mountains suggests that they are indeed correctly assigned to Castanopsis. In addition, two form taxa refer to the remains of these trees, at least in part: the fossil wood Castanoxylon eschweilerense and the fossil pollen Tricolporopollenites cingulum ssp. pusillus.

Castanopsis praefissa and Castanopsis praeouonbiensis are described from fossil specimens collected from the upper Miocene Shengxian Formation, Zhejiang Province, Southeast China. The fossil leaves are obovate to elliptical with serration mostly confined to the upper 1/3 of the leaf. The fossil cupule (upper part of the acorn) is globose with branched spines, and a broadly ovate nut scar. The fossil leaves and cupule have been compared with those extant in this genus. Castanopsis praefissa shows the closest affinity to C. fissa, and C. praeouonbiensis closely resembles C. ouonbiensis. Castanopsis praeouonbiensis and C. praefissa became extinct in this area because of the cooling climate from the late Miocene to the present day in Zhejiang Province.

The oldest known records of the genus are those of Castanopsis rothwellii and Castaneophyllum patagonicum from the Eocene of Patagonia.

== Distribution and habitat ==
Castanopsis had a much broader geographic range in the past than it does today. During the Plio-Pleistocene, glacial cooling and a drier climate caused the genus to disappear from Europe, North America, and parts of northern Asia. At present, Castanopsis is primarily found in tropical and subtropical regions of eastern and southeastern Asia. A total of 58 species are native to China, with 30 endemic; the other species occur further south, through Indochina to Indonesia and the Philippines, mountainous areas of Taiwan, and also in Japan.

== Ecology ==
In their rather circumscribed area of occurrence, Castanopsis are able to inhabit a wide range of temperate to tropical habitat and are often keystone species in their ecosystems. They are plentiful in ecotones as diverse as Borneo montane rain forests, Taiwan subtropical evergreen forests and Northern Triangle temperate forests. Generally they are common in Fagales-dominated montane forests and temperate to subtropical laurel forests. In the latter, they are characteristic elements of the climax vegetation in essentially their entire continental Asian range, as well as on Taiwan.

Plants of this genus grow on many soil types, as long as they are not calcareous. Several species have adapted to podsolic, peat bog, swamp and other acidic and/or wet soils, or to the poor dry soils common in arid habitat. Around the Oligo-Miocene boundary, Castanopsis grew abundantly along rivers and in bogs and swamps of then-subtropical Europe. The prehistoric plant community Castanopsietum oligo-miocenicum is the source of much of the lignite ("brown coal") deposits in Western and Central Europe.

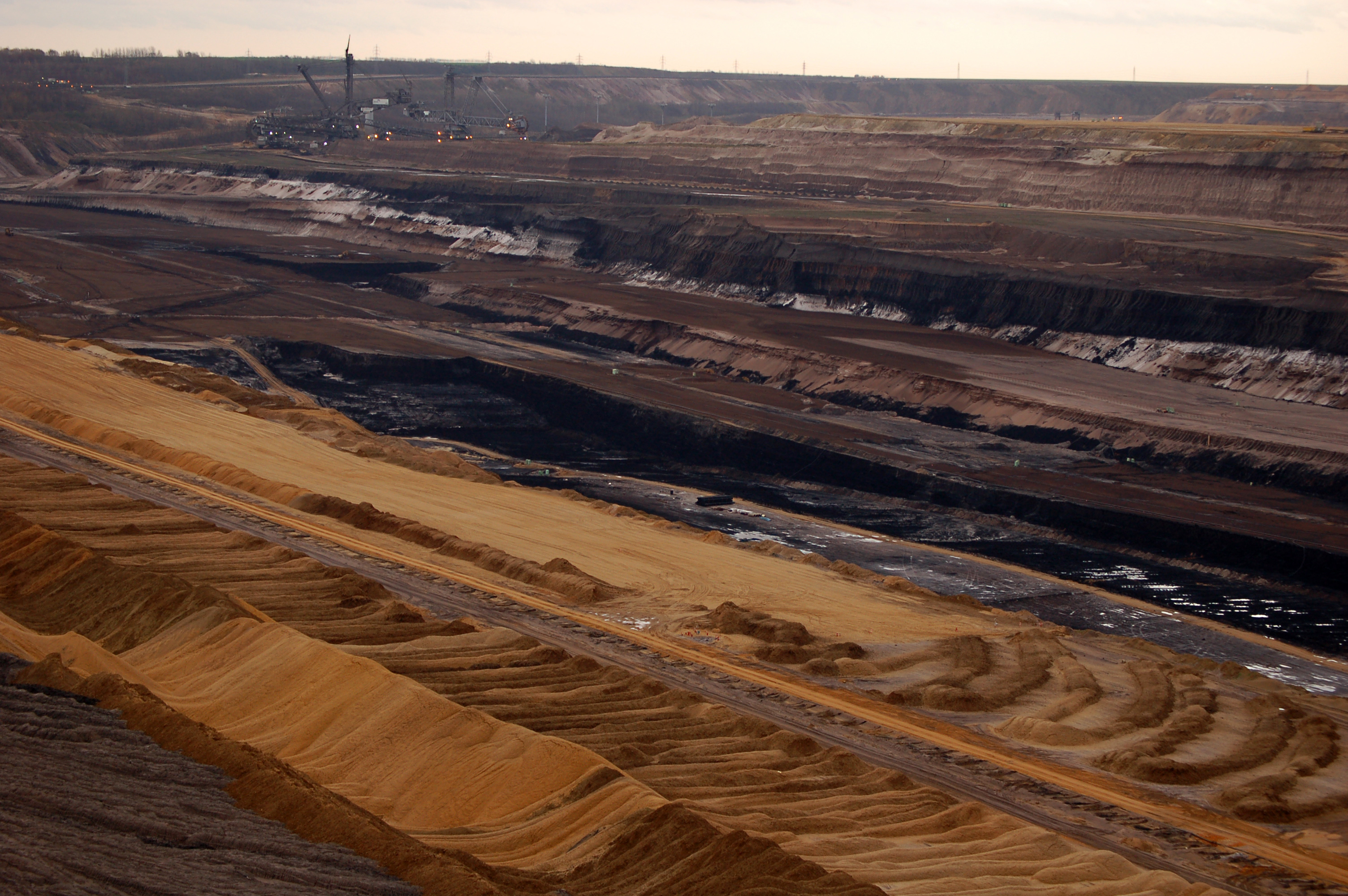
Strip mining for fossil Castanopsis in the form of lignite ("brown coal"). Garzweiler, Germany, 2006. (Bagger 288 and 289 in left background.)

== Uses ==
Most species yield valuable timber but some have become rare due to unsustainable logging; C. catappifolia is even in danger of extinction. As noted above, however, perhaps the most important use for Castanopsis wood is in its fossil form. 175,400 metric tons of lignite – much of which was former chinkapin trees – were mined in Germany in 2001.

As with many Fagaceae, the nuts of many Castanopsis species are edible. The trees may be grown for their nuts, but more often they are used as forestry or ornamental trees and the nuts are collected opportunistically. Among many animals, such as tits, corvids, rodents, deer and pigs, the nuts are popular as food too.

== In culture ==
The well-known and commercially important shiitake mushroom grows on the logs of C. cuspidata and derives its common name from this: shii-take simply means "Castanopsis cuspidata mushroom".
