= List of Lithocarpus species =

Plants of the World Online recognises about 330 accepted taxa (of species and infraspecific names) in the plant genus Lithocarpus of the beech family Fagaceae. Individual species are described in detail on www.asianfagaceae.com.

== A ==
- Lithocarpus acuminatus (Roxb.) Rehder
- Lithocarpus aggregatus Barnett
- Lithocarpus ailaoensis A.Camus
- Lithocarpus amherstianus (Wall. ex Hook.f.) A.Camus
- Lithocarpus amoenus W.Y.Chun & C.C.Huang
- Lithocarpus amygdalifolius (Skan) Hayata
- Lithocarpus andersonii Soepadmo
- Lithocarpus annamensis (Hickel & A.Camus) Barnett
- Lithocarpus annamitorus (A.Chev.) A.Camus
- Lithocarpus apoensis (Elmer) Rehder
- Lithocarpus apricus C.C.Huang & Y.T.Chang
- Lithocarpus arcaulus (Buch.-Ham. ex D.Don) C.C.Huang & Y.T.Chang
- Lithocarpus areca (Hickel & A.Camus) A.Camus
- Lithocarpus aspericupulus (Markgr.) Rehder
- Lithocarpus atjehensis Hatus. ex Soepadmo
- Lithocarpus attenuatus (Skan) Rehder
- Lithocarpus auriculatus (Hickel & A.Camus) Barnett

== B ==
- Lithocarpus bacgiangensis (Hickel & A.Camus) A.Camus
- Lithocarpus balansae (Drake) A.Camus
- Lithocarpus bancanus (Scheff.) Rehder
- Lithocarpus bassacensis (Hickel & A.Camus) Barnett
- Lithocarpus beccarianus (Benth.) A.Camus
- Lithocarpus bennettii (Miq.) Rehder
- Lithocarpus bentramensis (A.Camus) A.Camus
- Lithocarpus bicoloratus (Elmer) A.Camus
- Lithocarpus blaoensis (A.Camus) A.Camus
- Lithocarpus blumeanus (Korth.) Rehder
- Lithocarpus bolovenensis A.Camus
- Lithocarpus bonnetii (Hickel & A.Camus) A.Camus
- Lithocarpus brachystachyus Chun
- Lithocarpus braianensis A.Camus
- Lithocarpus brassii Soepadmo
- Lithocarpus brevicaudatus (Skan) Hayata
- Lithocarpus brochidodromus S.Julia & Soepadmo
- Lithocarpus bullatus Hatus. ex Soepadmo
- Lithocarpus burkillii A.Camus

== C ==
- Lithocarpus calolepis Y.C.Hsu & H.Wei Jen
- Lithocarpus calophyllus Chun ex C.C.Huang & Y.T.Chang
- Lithocarpus cambodiensis A.Camus
- Lithocarpus campylolepis A.Camus
- Lithocarpus cantleyanus (King ex Hook.f.) Rehder
- Lithocarpus carolinae (Skan ex Dunn) Rehder
- Lithocarpus castellarnauianus (Vidal) A.Camus
- Lithocarpus caudatifolius (Merr.) Rehder
- Lithocarpus caudatilimbus (Merr.) A.Camus
- Lithocarpus celebicus (Miq.) Rehder
- Lithocarpus cerifer (Hickel & A.Camus) A.Camus
- Lithocarpus chevalieri A.Camus
- Lithocarpus chienchuanensis Hu
- Lithocarpus chifui Chun & Tsiang
- Lithocarpus chittagongus (King ex Hook.f.) Merr.
- Lithocarpus chiungchungensis Chun & P.C.Tam
- Lithocarpus chrysocomus Chun & Tsiang
- Lithocarpus cinereus W.Y.Chun & C.C.Huang
- Lithocarpus clathratus (Seemen) Rehder
- Lithocarpus cleistocarpus (Seemen) Rehder & E.H.Wilson
- Lithocarpus clementianus (King ex Hook.f.) A.Camus
- Lithocarpus coalitus (Hickel & A.Camus) A.Camus
- Lithocarpus coinhensis (Hickel & A.Camus) A.Camus
- Lithocarpus concentricus (Lour.) Hjelmq.
- Lithocarpus confertus Soepadmo
- Lithocarpus confinis S.H.Huang ex Y.C.Hsu & H.W.Jen
- Lithocarpus confragosus (King ex Hook.f.) A.Camus
- Lithocarpus conocarpus (Oudem.) Rehder
- Lithocarpus coopertus (Blanco) Rehder
- Lithocarpus corneri S.Julia & Soepadmo
- Lithocarpus corneus (Lour.) Rehder
  - var. hainanensis (Merr.) C.C.Huang & Y.T.Chang
  - var. zonatus C.C.Huang & Y.T.Chang
- Lithocarpus cottonii A.Camus
- Lithocarpus craibianus Barnett
- Lithocarpus crassifolius A.Camus
- Lithocarpus crassinervius (Blume) Rehder
- Lithocarpus cryptocarpus A.Camus
- Lithocarpus cucullatus C.C.Huang & Y.T.Chang
- Lithocarpus curtisii (King ex Hook.f.) A.Camus
- Lithocarpus cyclophorus (Endl.) A.Camus
- Lithocarpus cyrtocarpus (Drake) A.Camus

== D ==
- Lithocarpus dalatensis A.Camus
- Lithocarpus damiaoshanicus C.C.Huang & Y.T.Chang
- Lithocarpus daphnoideus (Blume) A.Camus
- Lithocarpus dasystachyus (Miq.) Rehder
- Lithocarpus dealbatus (Hook.f. & Thomson ex Miq.) Rehder
  - subsp. leucostachyus (A.Camus) A.Camus
- Lithocarpus debaryanus (Warb.) Markgr.
- Lithocarpus dinhensis (Hickel & A.Camus) A.Camus
- Lithocarpus dodonaeifolius (Hayata) Hayata
- Lithocarpus dolichostachys A.Camus
- Lithocarpus ducampii (Hickel & A.Camus) A.Camus

== E ==
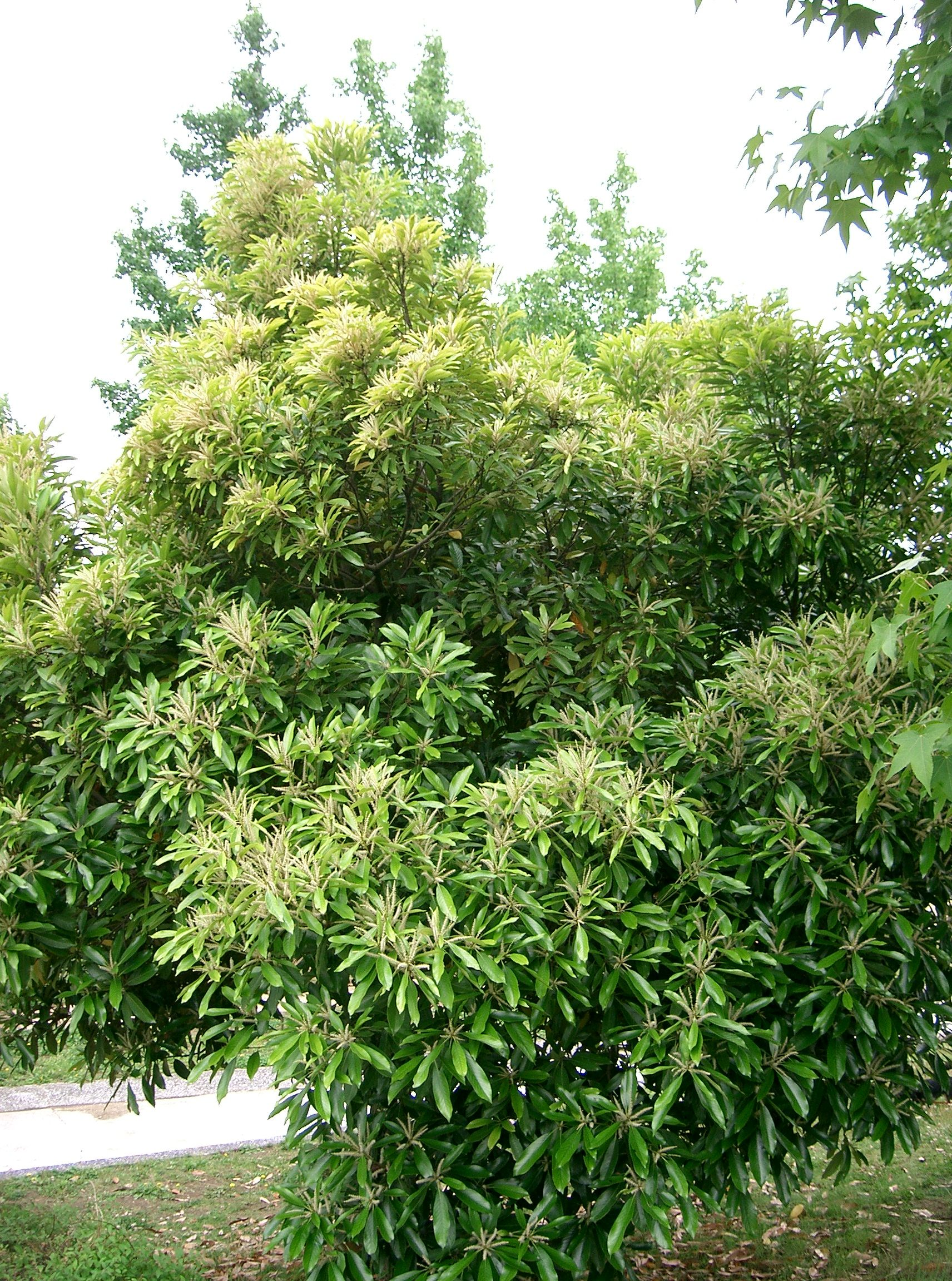
Lithocarpus edulis

- Lithocarpus echinifer (Merr.) A.Camus
- Lithocarpus echinocarpus (Hickel & A.Camus) A.Camus
- Lithocarpus echinophorus (Hickel & A.Camus) A.Camus
- Lithocarpus echinops Hjelmq.
- Lithocarpus echinotholus (Hu) H.Y.Chun & Huang ex Y.C.Hsu & H.W.Jen
- Lithocarpus echinulatus Soepadmo
- Lithocarpus edulis (Makino) Nakai
- Lithocarpus eichleri (Wenz.) A.Camus
- Lithocarpus elaeagnifolius (Seemen) Chun
- Lithocarpus elegans (Blume) Hatus. ex Soepadmo
- Lithocarpus elephantum (Hance) A.Camus
- Lithocarpus elizabethiae (Tutcher) Rehder
- Lithocarpus elmerrillii Chun
- Lithocarpus encleisacarpus (Korth.) A.Camus
- Lithocarpus eriobotryoides C.C.Huang & Y.T.Chang
- Lithocarpus erythrocarpus (Ridl.) A.Camus
- Lithocarpus eucalyptifolius (Hickel & A.Camus) A.Camus
- Lithocarpus ewyckii (Korth.) Rehder

== F ==
- Lithocarpus falconeri (Kurz) Rehder
- Lithocarpus fangii (Hu & W.C.Cheng) C.C.Huang & Y.T.Chang
- Lithocarpus farinulentus (Hance) A.Camus
- Lithocarpus fenestratus (Roxb.) Rehder
- Lithocarpus fenzelianus A.Camus
- Lithocarpus ferrugineus Soepadmo
- Lithocarpus floccosus C.C.Huang & Y.T.Chang
- Lithocarpus fohaiensis (Hu) A.Camus
- Lithocarpus fordianus (Hemsl.) Chun
- Lithocarpus formosanus (Skan) Hayata

== G ==
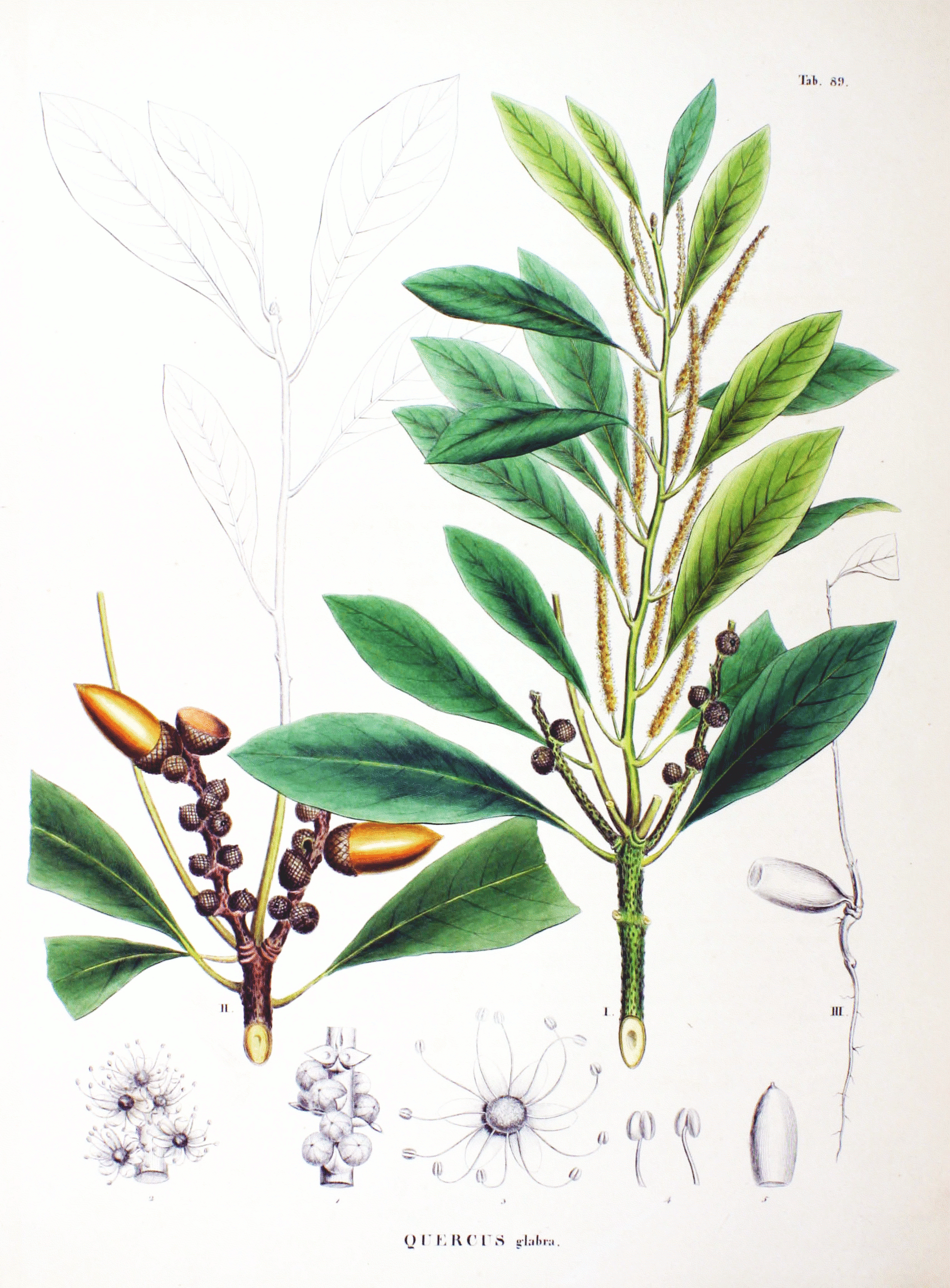
Lithocarpus glaber

- Lithocarpus gaoligongensis C.C.Huang & Y.T.Chang
- Lithocarpus garrettianus (Craib) A.Camus
- Lithocarpus gigantophyllus (Hickel & A.Camus) A.Camus
- Lithocarpus glaber (Thunb.) Nakai
- Lithocarpus glaucus Chun & C.C.Huang ex H.G.Ye
- Lithocarpus glutinosus (Blume) Soepadmo
- Lithocarpus gougerotae A.Camus
- Lithocarpus gracilis (Korth.) Soepadmo
- Lithocarpus guinieri A.Camus
- Lithocarpus gymnocarpus A.Camus

== H ==
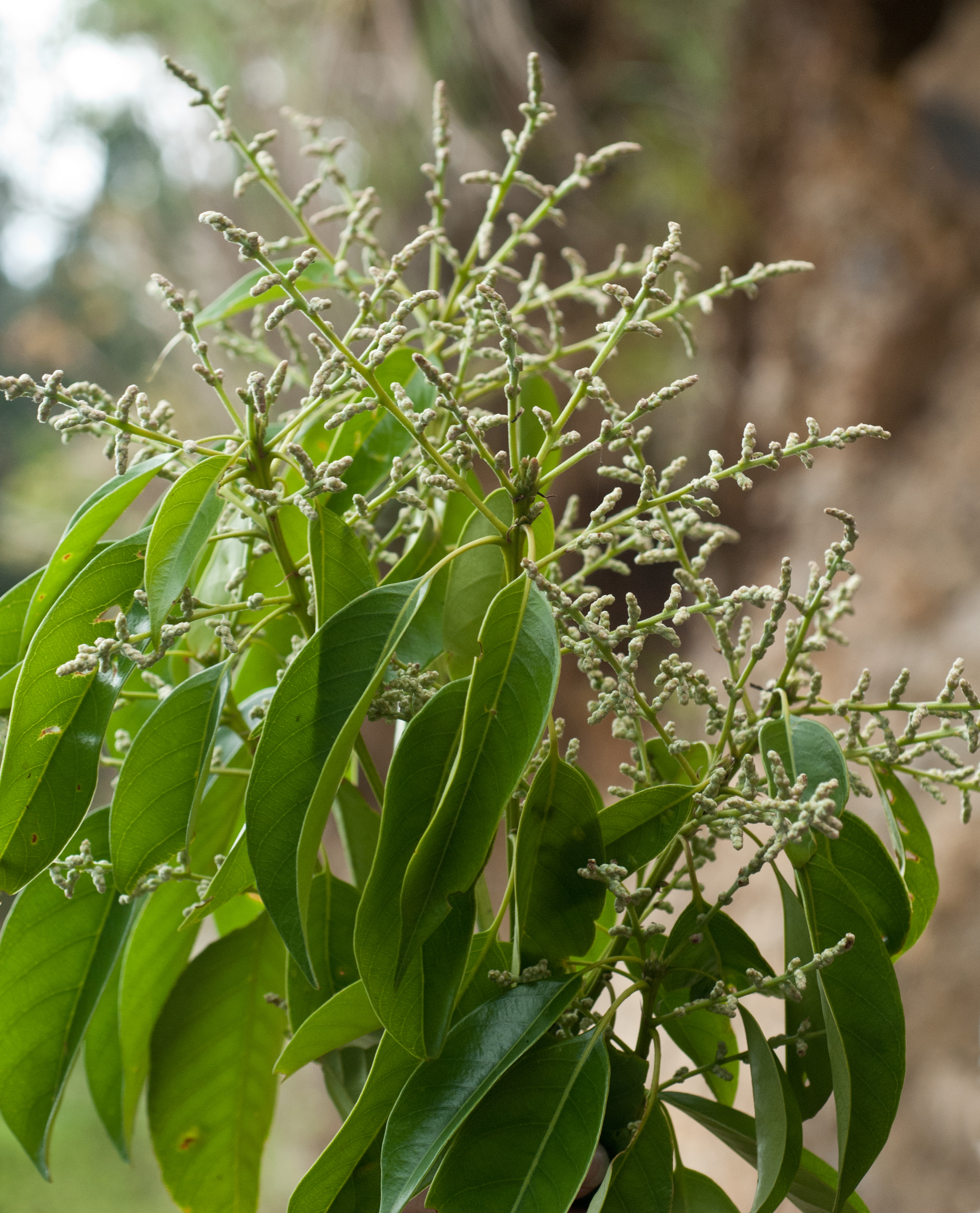
Lithocarpus harlandii

- Lithocarpus haipinii Chun
- Lithocarpus hallieri (Seemen) A.Camus
- Lithocarpus hancei (Benth.) Rehder
- Lithocarpus handelianus A.Camus
- Lithocarpus harlandii (Hance ex Walp.) Rehder
- Lithocarpus harmandii (Hickel & A.Camus) A.Camus
- Lithocarpus hatusimae Soepadmo
- Lithocarpus havilandii (Stapf) Barnett
- Lithocarpus hendersonianus A.Camus
- Lithocarpus henryi (Seemen) Rehder & E.H.Wilson
- Lithocarpus himalaicus C.C.Huang & Y.T.Chang
- Lithocarpus honbaensis A.Camus
- Lithocarpus howii Chun
- Lithocarpus hypoglaucus (Hu) C.C.Huang ex Y.C.Hsu & H.W.Jen
- Lithocarpus hystrix (Korth.) Rehder

== I ==
- Lithocarpus imperialis (Seemen) Markgr.
- Lithocarpus indutus (Blume) Rehder
- Lithocarpus irwinii (Hance) Rehder
- Lithocarpus iteaphyllus (Hance) Rehder
- Lithocarpus ithyphyllus Chun ex H.T.Chang

== J ==
- Lithocarpus jacksonianus A.Camus
- Lithocarpus jacobsii Soepadmo
- Lithocarpus javensis Blume
- Lithocarpus jenkinsii (Benth.) C.C.Huang & Y.T.Chang
- Lithocarpus jordanae (Laguna) Rehder

== K ==
- Lithocarpus kalkmanii S.Julia & Soepadmo
- Lithocarpus kamengii K.C.Sahni & H.B.Naithani
- Lithocarpus kawakamii (Hayata) Hayata
- Lithocarpus kemmaratensis (Hickel & A.Camus) A.Camus
- Lithocarpus keningauensis S.Julia & Soepadmo
- Lithocarpus kingianus (Gamble) A.Camus
- Lithocarpus kochummenii S.Julia & Soepadmo
- Lithocarpus konishii (Hayata) Hayata
- Lithocarpus kontumensis A.Camus
- Lithocarpus korthalsii (Endl.) Soepadmo
- Lithocarpus kostermansii Soepadmo
- Lithocarpus kozlovii A.Camus
- Lithocarpus kunstleri (King ex Hook.f.) A.Camus

== L ==
- Lithocarpus laetus Chun & C.C.Huang ex Y.C.Hsu & H.W.Jen
- Lithocarpus lampadarius (Gamble) A.Camus
- Lithocarpus laoticus (Hickel & A.Camus) A.Camus
- Lithocarpus laouanensis A.Camus
- Lithocarpus lappaceus (Roxb.) Rehder
- Lithocarpus lauterbachii (Seemen) Markgr.
- Lithocarpus leiocarpus A.Camus
- Lithocarpus leiophyllus A.Camus
- Lithocarpus leiostachyus A.Camus
- Lithocarpus lemeeanus A.Camus
- Lithocarpus lepidocarpus (Hayata) Hayata
- Lithocarpus leptogyne (Korth.) Soepadmo
- Lithocarpus leucodermis W.Y.Chun & C.C.Huang
- Lithocarpus levis W.Y.Chun & C.C.Huang
- Lithocarpus licentii A.Camus
- Lithocarpus lindleyanus (Wall. ex A.DC.) A.Camus
- Lithocarpus listeri (King) Grierson & D.G.Long
- Lithocarpus lithocarpaeus (Oerst.) Hjelmq.
- Lithocarpus litseifolius (Hance) Chun
- Lithocarpus longanoides C.C.Huang & Y.T.Chang
- Lithocarpus longipedicellatus (Hickel & A.Camus) A.Camus
- Lithocarpus longzhouicus (C.C.Huang & Y.T.Chang) J.Q.Li & Li Chen
- Lithocarpus loratifolius Phengklai
- Lithocarpus lucidus (Roxb.) Rehder
- Lithocarpus luteus Soepadmo
- Lithocarpus luzoniensis (Merr.) Rehder
- Lithocarpus lycoperdon (Skan) A.Camus

== M ==
- Lithocarpus macilentus W.Y.Chun & C.C.Huang
- Lithocarpus macphailii (M.R.Hend.) Barnett
- Lithocarpus magneinii (Hickel & A.Camus) A.Camus
- Lithocarpus magnificus (Brandis) A.Camus
- Lithocarpus maingayi (Benth.) Rehder
- Lithocarpus mairei (Schottky) Rehder
- Lithocarpus mariae Soepadmo
- Lithocarpus megacarpus Soepadmo
- Lithocarpus megalophyllus Rehder & E.H.Wilson
- Lithocarpus megastachyus (Hickel & A.Camus) A.Camus
- Lithocarpus meijeri Soepadmo
- Lithocarpus mekongensis (A.Camus) C.C.Huang & Y.T.Zhang
- Lithocarpus melanochromus Chun & Tsiang ex C.C.Huang & Y.T.Chang
- Lithocarpus melataiensis S.Julia & Soepadmo
- Lithocarpus menadoensis (Koord.) Soepadmo
- Lithocarpus mianningensis Hu
- Lithocarpus microbalanus A.Camus
- Lithocarpus microlepis A.Camus
- Lithocarpus milroyi (Purkayastha) Barnett
- Lithocarpus mindanaensis (Elmer) Rehder
- Lithocarpus moluccus (L.) Soepadmo
- Lithocarpus monticolus (Koidz.) Rehder
- Lithocarpus muluensis S.Julia & Soepadmo

== N ==
- Lithocarpus naiadarum (Hance) Chun
- Lithocarpus nantoensis (Hayata) Hayata
- Lithocarpus nebularum A.Camus
- Lithocarpus neorobinsonii A.Camus
- Lithocarpus nhatrangensis (Hickel & A.Camus) A.Camus
- Lithocarpus nieuwenhuisii (Seemen) A.Camus
- Lithocarpus nitidinux (Hu) Chun ex C.C.Huang & Y.T.Chang
- Lithocarpus nodosus Soepadmo

== O ==
- Lithocarpus oblanceolatus C.C.Huang & Y.T.Chang
- Lithocarpus oblancifolius S.Julia & Soepadmo
- Lithocarpus obovalifolius (Hickel & A.Camus) Barnett
- Lithocarpus obovatilimbus Chun
- Lithocarpus obscurus C.C.Huang & Y.T.Chang
- Lithocarpus ochrocarpus A.Camus
- Lithocarpus oleifolius A.Camus
- Lithocarpus ollus (Kurz) A.Camus
- Lithocarpus ombrophilus A.Camus
- Lithocarpus oogyne (Miq.) A.Camus
- Lithocarpus orbicarpus Strijk
- Lithocarpus orbicularis Soepadmo
- Lithocarpus ovalis (Blanco) Rehder

== P ==
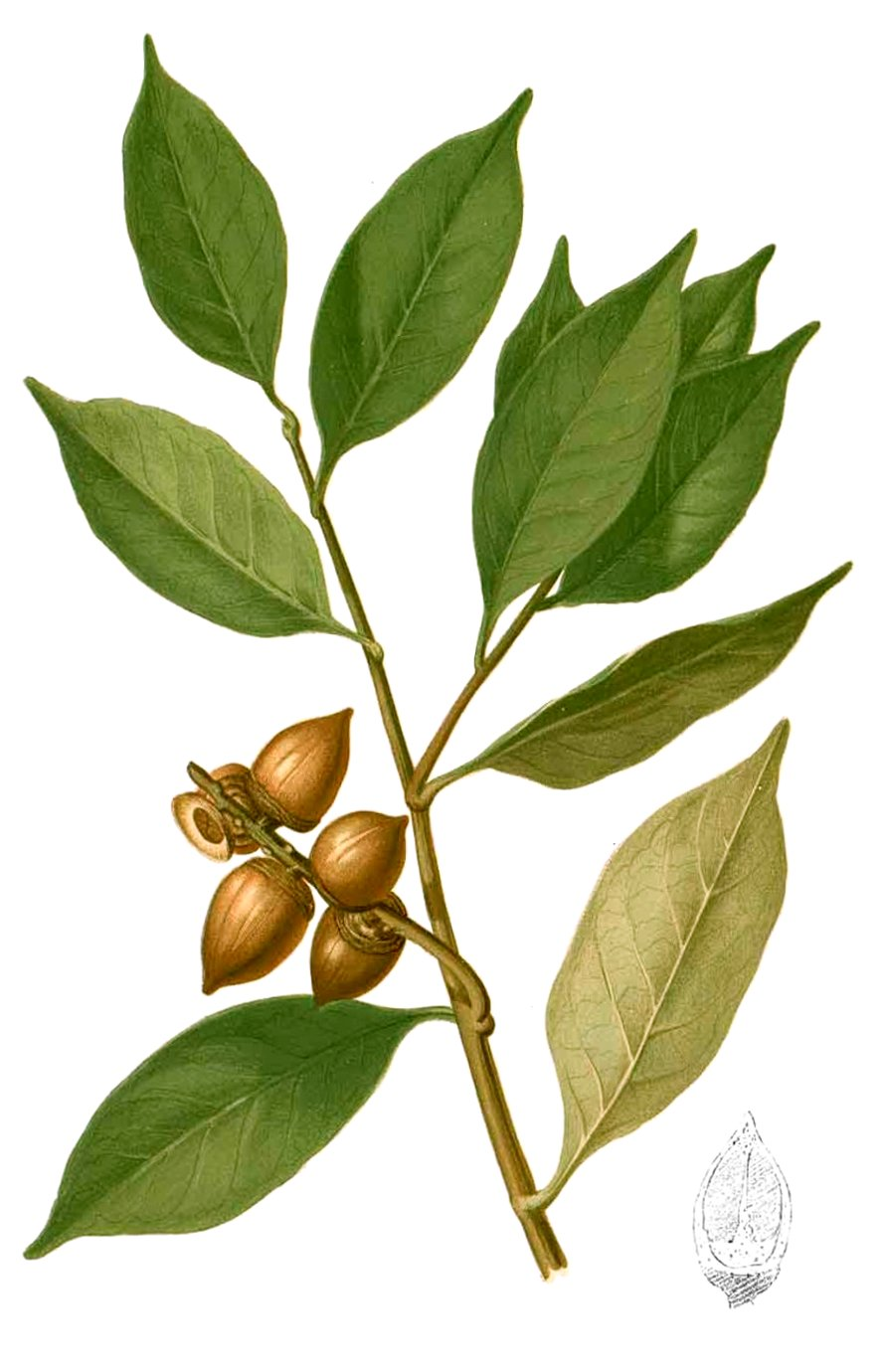
Lithocarpus pseudoreinwardtii

- Lithocarpus pachycarpus (Hickel & A.Camus) A.Camus
- Lithocarpus pachylepis A.Camus
- Lithocarpus pachyphyllus (Kurz) Rehder
  - var. fruticosus (Watt ex King) A.Camus
- Lithocarpus paihengii Chun & Tsiang
- Lithocarpus pakhaensis A.Camus
- Lithocarpus pallidus (Blume) Rehder
- Lithocarpus palungensis C.H.Cannon & Manos
- Lithocarpus paniculatus Hand.-Mazz.
- Lithocarpus papillifer Hatus. ex Soepadmo
- Lithocarpus parvulus (Hickel & A.Camus) A.Camus
- Lithocarpus pattaniensis Barnett
- Lithocarpus paviei (Hickel & A.Camus) A.Camus
- Lithocarpus perakensis Soepadmo
- Lithocarpus petelotii A.Camus
- Lithocarpus phansipanensis A.Camus
- Lithocarpus philippinensis (A.DC.) Rehder
- Lithocarpus pierrei (Hickel & A.Camus) A.Camus
- Lithocarpus platycarpus (Blume) Rehder
- Lithocarpus platyphyllus A.Camus
- Lithocarpus polystachyus (Wall. ex A.DC.) Rehder
- Lithocarpus porcatus Soepadmo
- Lithocarpus proboscideus (Hickel & A.Camus) A.Camus
- Lithocarpus propinquus C.C.Huang & Y.T.Chang
- Lithocarpus psammophilus A.Camus
- Lithocarpus pseudokunstleri A.Camus
- Lithocarpus pseudomagneinii A.Camus
- Lithocarpus pseudomoluccus (Blume) Rehder
- Lithocarpus pseudoreinwardtii A.Camus
- Lithocarpus pseudosundaicus (Hickel & A.Camus) A.Camus
- Lithocarpus pseudovestitus A.Camus
- Lithocarpus pseudoxizangensis Z.K.Zhou & H.Sun
- Lithocarpus pulcher (King) Markgr.
- Lithocarpus pulongtauensis Cannon & Xi
- Lithocarpus pusillus Soepadmo
- Lithocarpus pycnostachys A.Camus

== Q ==
- Lithocarpus qinzhouicus C.C.Huang & Y.T.Chang
- Lithocarpus quangnamensis A.Camus
- Lithocarpus quercifolius C.C.Huang & Y.T.Chang

== R ==
- Lithocarpus rassa (Miq.) Rehder
- Lithocarpus recurvatus Barnett
- Lithocarpus reinwardtii (Korth.) A.Camus
- Lithocarpus revolutus Hatus. ex Soepadmo
- Lithocarpus rhabdostachyus (Hickel & A.Camus) A.Camus
- Lithocarpus rigidus Soepadmo
- Lithocarpus robinsonii Rehder
- Lithocarpus rosthornii (Schottky) Barnett
- Lithocarpus rotundatus (Blume) A.Camus
- Lithocarpus rouletii (Hickel & A.Camus) A.Camus
- Lithocarpus rufescens Barnett
- Lithocarpus rufovillosus (Markgr.) Rehder
- Lithocarpus rufus (Koidz.) A.Camus
- Lithocarpus ruminatus Soepadmo

== S ==
- Lithocarpus sandakanensis S.Julia & Soepadmo
- Lithocarpus scortechinii (King ex Hook.f.) A.Camus
- Lithocarpus scyphiger (Hance) A.Camus
- Lithocarpus sericobalanos E.F.Warb.
- Lithocarpus shinsuiensis Hayata & Kaneh.
- Lithocarpus shunningensis Hu
- Lithocarpus siamensis A.Camus
- Lithocarpus silvicolarum (Hance) Chun
- Lithocarpus skanianus (Dunn) Rehder
- Lithocarpus sogerensis (S.Moore) Markgr. ex A.Camus
- Lithocarpus solerianus (Vidal) Rehder
- Lithocarpus songkoensis A.Camus
- Lithocarpus sootepensis (Craib) A.Camus
- Lithocarpus sphaerocarpus (Hickel & A.Camus) A.Camus
- Lithocarpus stenopus (Hickel & A.Camus) A.Camus
- Lithocarpus stonei S.Julia & Soepadmo
- Lithocarpus submonticolus (Elmer) Rehder
- Lithocarpus suffruticosus (Ridl.) Soepadmo
- Lithocarpus sulitii Soepadmo
- Lithocarpus sundaicus (Blume) Rehder
- Lithocarpus syncarpus A.Camus

== T ==
- Lithocarpus tabularis Y.C.Hsu & H.Wei Jen
- Lithocarpus taitoensis (Hayata) Hayata
- Lithocarpus talangensis C.C.Huang & Y.T.Chang
- Lithocarpus tapanuliensis Harapan, W.H.Tan, Nurainas & Strijk
- Lithocarpus tawaiensis S.Julia & Soepadmo
- Lithocarpus tenuilimbus H.T.Chang
- Lithocarpus tenuinervis (Hickel & A.Camus) A.Camus
- Lithocarpus tephrocarpus (Drake) A.Camus
- Lithocarpus thomsonii (Miq.) Rehder
- Lithocarpus toumorangensis A.Camus
- Lithocarpus touranensis (Hickel & A.Camus) A.Camus
- Lithocarpus trachycarpus (Hickel & A.Camus) A.Camus
- Lithocarpus triqueter (Hickel & A.Camus) A.Camus
- Lithocarpus truncatus (King ex Hook.f.) Rehder
- Lithocarpus tubulosus (Hickel & A.Camus) A.Camus
- Lithocarpus turbinatus (Stapf) Forman

== U ==
- Lithocarpus uraianus (Hayata) Hayata
- Lithocarpus urceolaris (Jack) Merr.
- Lithocarpus uvariifolius (Hance) Rehder
  - var. ellipticus (F.P.Metcalf) C.C.Huang & Y.T.Chang

== V ==
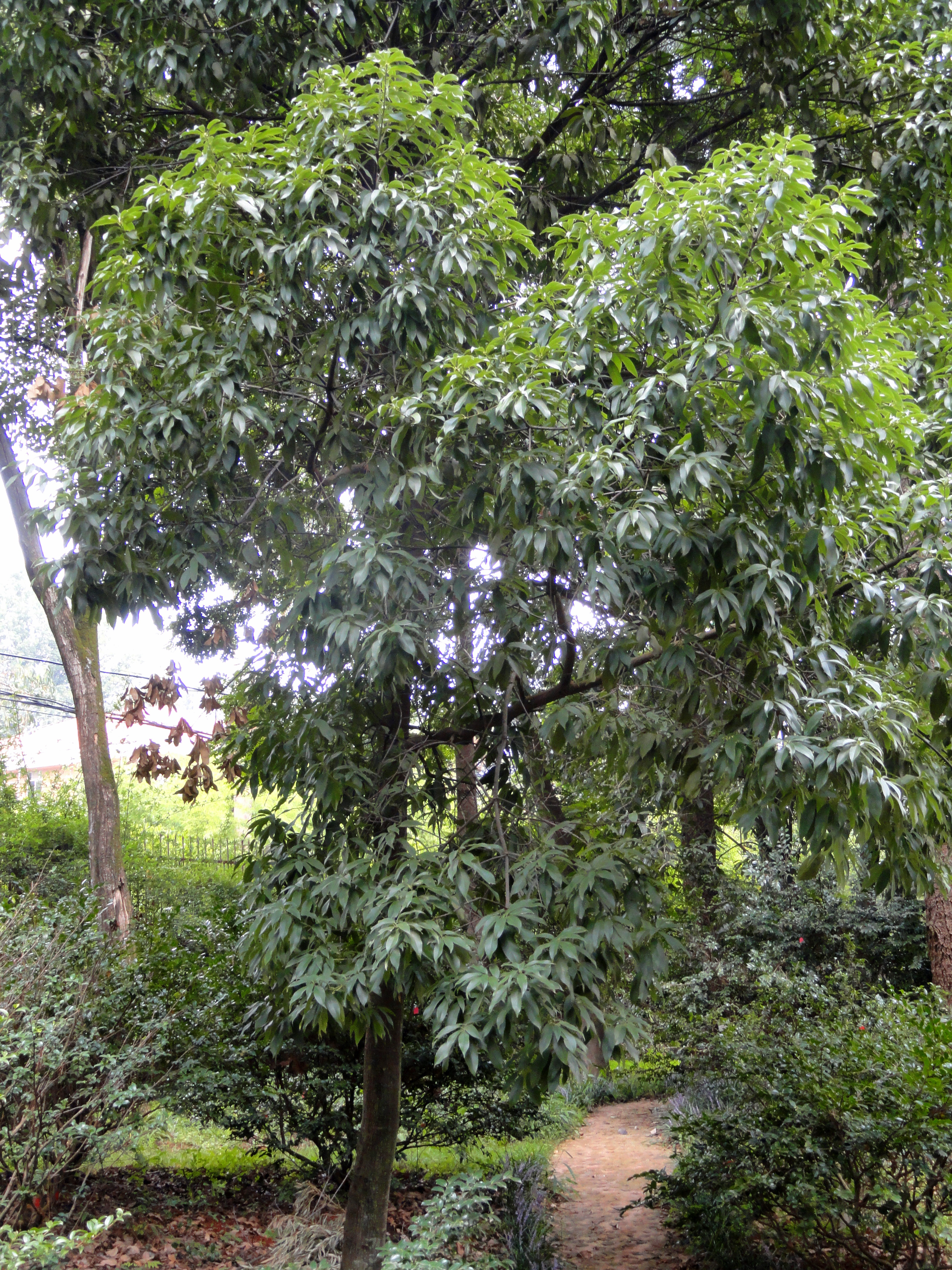
Lithocarpus vestitus

- Lithocarpus variolosus (Franch.) Chun
- Lithocarpus vestitus (Hickel & A.Camus) A.Camus
- Lithocarpus vidalianus A.Camus
- Lithocarpus vidalii (Fern.-Vill.) Rehder
- Lithocarpus vinhensis A.Camus
- Lithocarpus vinkii Soepadmo

== W ==
- Lithocarpus wallichianus (Lindl. ex Hance) Rehder
- Lithocarpus woodii (Hance) A.Camus
- Lithocarpus wrayi (King) A.Camus

== X ==
- Lithocarpus xizangensis C.C.Huang & Y.T.Chang
- Lithocarpus xylocarpus (Kurz) Markgr.
- Lithocarpus yangchunensis H.G.Ye & F.G.Wang

== Y ==
- Lithocarpus yersinii A.Camus
- Lithocarpus yongfuensis Q.F.Zheng
