= Lithocarpus gracilis =

Conservation status
- Least Concern (IUCN 3.1)

Scientific classification
- Kingdom: Plantae
- Clade: Embryophytes
- Clade: Tracheophytes
- Clade: Spermatophytes
- Clade: Angiosperms
- Clade: Eudicots
- Clade: Rosids
- Order: Fagales
- Family: Fagaceae
- Genus: Lithocarpus
- Species: L. gracilis

Binomial name
- Lithocarpus gracilis (Korth.) Soepadmo

Synonyms
- List: Quercus gracilis Korth.; Cyclobalanus gracilis (Korth.) Oerst.; Quercus cyrtorhyncha Miq.; Quercus diepenhorstii Miq.; Cyclobalanus diepenhorstii (Miq.) Oerst.; Pasania cyrtorhyncha (Miq.) Gamble; Synaedrys cyrtorhyncha (Miq.) Koidz.; Synaedrys diepenhorstii (Miq.) Koidz.; Lithocarpus cyrtorhynchus (Miq.) Rehder; Lithocarpus diepenhorstii (Miq.) Barnett; Lithocarpus cyathiformis A.Camus

Species of tree

Lithocarpus gracilis is a tree in the beech family Fagaceae. The specific epithet gracilis means 'slender', referring to the twigs.

== Description ==
Lithocarpus gracilis grows as a tree up to 50 metres (160 ft) tall with a trunk diameter of up to 90 cm (40 in). Its buttresses grow up to 1.5 m (5 ft) in height. The greyish brown bark is smooth, fissured or scaly. Its coriaceous leaves measure up to 18 cm (7 in) long. The brownish acorns are ovoid to conical and measure up to 2.5 cm (1 in) across.

== Distribution and habitat ==
Lithocarpus gracilis grows naturally in Peninsular Malaysia, Sumatra, and Borneo. Its habitat is mixed dipterocarp (including kerangas) forests to 1,200 m (4,000 ft) elevation.

== Conservation ==
Lithocarpus gracilis has been assessed as least concern on the IUCN Red List. Its lowland habitat makes it vulnerable to land conversion. Harvesting for its timber is also a threat. In Sabah, logging of Lithocarpus species is prohibited by law. In 2009, the species was assessed as extinct in Singapore.

== Uses ==
The timber is locally used in construction.
