= Lithocarpus daphnoideus =

Conservation status
- Least Concern (IUCN 3.1)

Scientific classification
- Kingdom: Plantae
- Clade: Tracheophytes
- Clade: Angiosperms
- Clade: Eudicots
- Clade: Rosids
- Order: Fagales
- Family: Fagaceae
- Genus: Lithocarpus
- Species: L. daphnoideus

Binomial name
- Lithocarpus daphnoideus (Blume) A.Camus

Synonyms
- Cyclobalanus daphnoidea (Blume) Oerst.; Cyclobalanus nitida Oerst.; Lithocarpus dolichocarpus (Seemen) Rehder; Lithocarpus nitidus (Oerst.) A.Camus; Lithocarpus poculiformis (Seemen) A.Camus; Lithocarpus sarawakensis E.F.Warb.; Pasania daphnoidea (Blume) S.Moore; Quercus daphnoidea Blume; Quercus dolichocarpa Seemen; Quercus poculiformis Seemen; Synaedrys daphnoidea (Blume) Koidz.; Synaedrys dolichocarpa (Seemen) Koidz.; Synaedrys poculiformis (Seemen) Koidz.

Species of tree

Lithocarpus daphnoideus is a tree in the family Fagaceae. The specific epithet daphnoideus means "like Daphne", referring to the genus Daphne and its leaves.

== Description ==
Lithocarpus daphnoideus grows as a tree up to 24 metres (80 ft) tall with a trunk diameter of up to 50 cm (20 in). The greyish brown bark is smooth or fissured. The coriaceous leaves measure up to 16 cm (6 in) long. Its dark brownish or red-brown acorns are conical or ovoid and measure up to 1.5 cm (0.6 in) across.

== Distribution and habitat ==
Lithocarpus daphnoideus grows naturally in Sumatra, Peninsular Malaysia, Java and Borneo. Its habitat is hill dipterocarp to lower montane forests up to 1,400 m (5,000 ft) elevation.
