= Lithocarpus encleisacarpus =

Conservation status
- Least Concern (IUCN 3.1)

Scientific classification
- Kingdom: Plantae
- Clade: Embryophytes
- Clade: Tracheophytes
- Clade: Angiosperms
- Clade: Eudicots
- Clade: Rosids
- Order: Fagales
- Family: Fagaceae
- Genus: Lithocarpus
- Species: L. encleisacarpus

Binomial name
- Lithocarpus encleisacarpus (Korth.) A.Camus

Synonyms
- Castanopsis encleisacarpa (Korth.) Rehder; Cyclobalanus encleisacarpa (Korth.) Oerst.; Pasania encleisacarpa (Korth.) Gamble; Quercus encleisacarpa Korth.; Synaedrys encleisacarpa (Korth.) Koidz.

Species of tree

Lithocarpus encleisacarpus is a tree in the beech family Fagaceae. The specific epithet is from the Greek meaning 'enclosed fruit', referring to the acorns and cupules. The cupule is not fused to the nut though and often becomes irregularly dehiscent. The degree to which the nut is enclosed by the cupule varies across its geographic range. Trees in Lithocarpus are commonly known as the stone oaks and differ from Quercus primarily because they produce insect-pollinated flowers.

== Description ==
Lithocarpus encleisacarpus grows as a tree up to 40 metres (130 ft) tall with a trunk diameter of up to 75 cm (30 in). The greyish brown bark is smooth or scaly or lenticellate. The coriaceous leaves measure up to 15 cm (6 in) long and have obscure tertiary web-like reticulations. Its dark brown acorns are ovoid to roundish and measure up to 3 cm (1.2 in) across. The fruits typically have 1-1.5 cm stalks and the cupule has several smooth to slightly ridge-like lamellae circling or spiraling around the outside. The nuts are free from the cupule and have silvery tomentum.

== Distribution and habitat ==
Lithocarpus encleisacarpus is native to Peninsular Thailand, Peninsular Malaysia, Singapore, Sumatra and Borneo. It has also been reported from Vietnam. Its habitat is mixed dipterocarp to lower montane forests at 1,000–1,500 m (3,000–5,000 ft) elevation.

== Uses ==
The timber is locally used as firewood and in construction. The bark's tannins are used in dyeing.
