= Lithocarpus ewyckii =

Conservation status
- Least Concern (IUCN 3.1)

Scientific classification
- Kingdom: Plantae
- Clade: Tracheophytes
- Clade: Angiosperms
- Clade: Eudicots
- Clade: Rosids
- Order: Fagales
- Family: Fagaceae
- Genus: Lithocarpus
- Species: L. ewyckii

Binomial name
- Lithocarpus ewyckii (Korth.) Rehder

Synonyms
- Cyclobalanus ewyckii (Korth.) Oerst.; Lithocarpus pseudolamponga A.Camus; Pasania ewyckii (Korth.) Gamble; Pasania ewyckii var. latifolia (King ex Hook.f.) Gamble; Quercus ewyckii Korth.; Quercus ewyckii var. latifolia King ex Hook.f.; Quercus lamponga var. ewyckioides Gamble; Synaedrys ewyckii (Korth.) Koidz.

Species of tree

Lithocarpus ewyckii is a tree in the beech family Fagaceae.

The species was first described as Quercus ewyckii by Pieter Willem Korthals in 1842. It is named for D.J. van Ewijck van Oostbroek en De Built of the Dutch Colonial Service. In 1929 Alfred Rehder placed the species in genus Lithocarpus as L. ewyckii.

== Description ==
Lithocarpus ewyckii grows as a tree up to 50 metres (160 ft) tall with a trunk diameter of up to 90 cm (40 in). The smooth or scaly bark is greyish brown to reddish brown. Its coriaceous leaves are yellowish tomentose and measure up to 15 cm (6 in) long. The brownish acorns are ovoid to conical and measure up to 2.5 cm (1 in) across.

== Distribution and habitat ==
Lithocarpus ewyckii grows naturally in Peninsular Malaysia, Singapore, Sumatra and Borneo. Its habitat is lowland mixed dipterocarp rain forest (including kerangas) and montane rain forest from 200 m (700 ft) to 2,000 m (7,000 ft) elevation.
