= Lithocarpus hystrix =

Scientific classification
- Kingdom: Plantae
- Clade: Tracheophytes
- Clade: Angiosperms
- Clade: Eudicots
- Clade: Rosids
- Order: Fagales
- Family: Fagaceae
- Genus: Lithocarpus
- Species: L. hystrix

Binomial name
- Lithocarpus hystrix (Korth.) Rehder

Synonyms
- Quercus hystrix Korth.; Cyclobalanus hystrix (Korth.) Oerst.; Pasania hystrix (Korth.) Gamble; Synaedrys hystrix (Korth.) Koidz.; Quercus kajan Miq.; Quercus cyrtopoda Miq.; Castanea furfurella Miq.; Cyclobalanus cyrtopoda (Miq.) Oerst.; Quercus brevipetiolata Scheff.; Lithocarpus cyrtopodus (Miq.) A.Camus

Species of tree

Lithocarpus hystrix is a tree in the beech family Fagaceae. The specific epithet hystrix means 'spiny', referring to the cupule.

== Description ==
Lithocarpus hystrix grows as a tree up to 36 metres (120 ft) tall with a trunk diameter of up to 75 cm (30 in). The brownish or reddish bark is scaly or lenticellate and contains tannin. Its coriaceous leaves are tomentose and measure up to 16 cm (6 in) long. The purplish acorns are ovoid to conical and measure up to 2 cm (1 in) across.

== Distribution and habitat ==
Lithocarpus hystrix grows naturally in Peninsular Malaysia, Singapore, Sumatra and Borneo. Its habitat is mixed dipterocarp to montane forests from 300 m (1,000 ft) to 1,300 m (4,000 ft) elevation.
