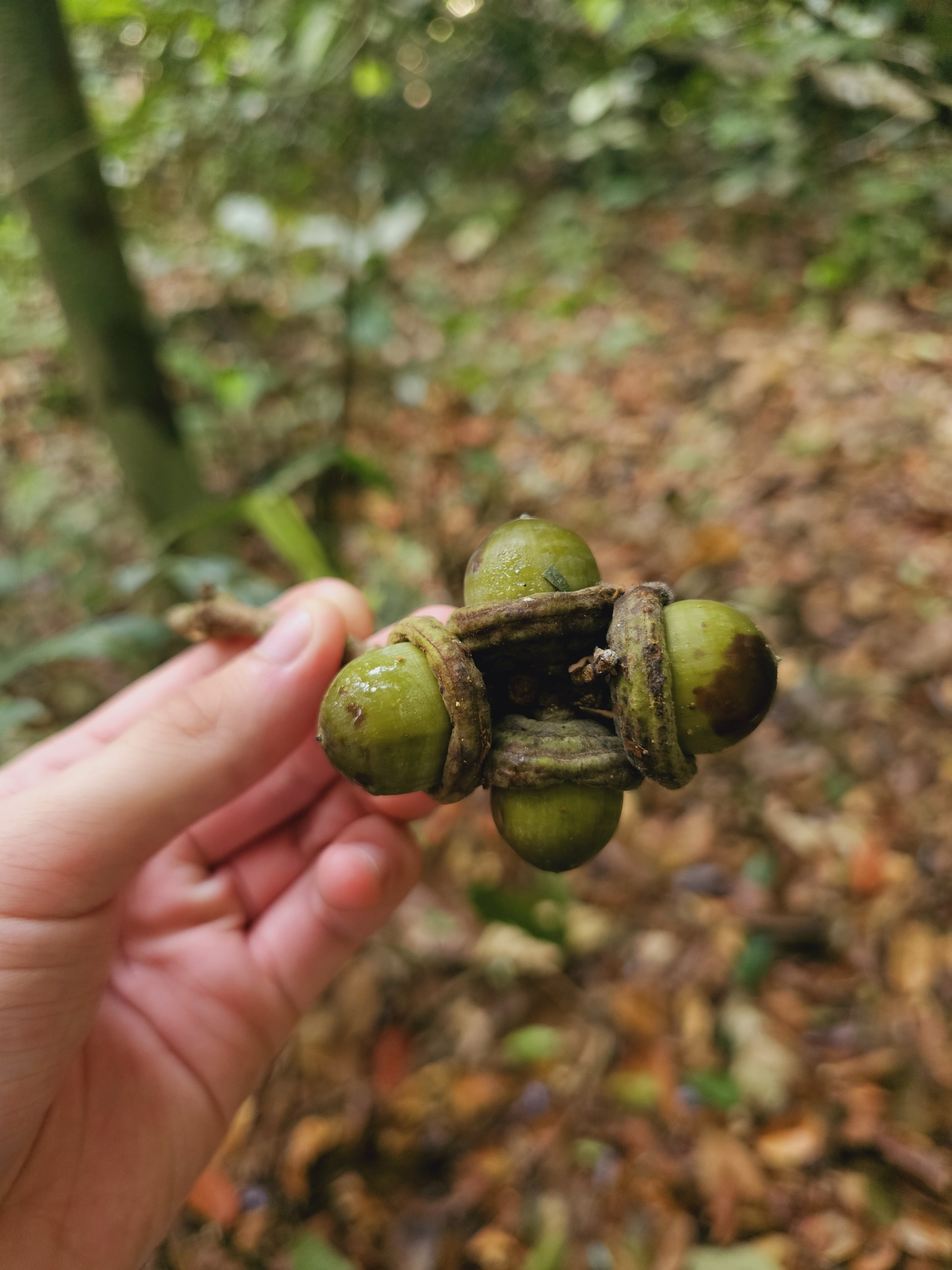
- In Johor, Malaysia

Scientific classification
- Kingdom: Plantae
- Clade: Tracheophytes
- Clade: Angiosperms
- Clade: Eudicots
- Clade: Rosids
- Order: Fagales
- Family: Fagaceae
- Genus: Lithocarpus
- Species: L. lucidus

Binomial name
- Lithocarpus lucidus (Roxb.) Rehder

Synonyms
- Quercus lucida Roxb.; Pasania lucida (Roxb.) Gamble; Synaedrys lucida (Roxb.) Koidz.; Quercus omalokos Korth.; Quercus hasseltii Korth. ex Miq.; Cyclobalanus omalokos (Korth.) Oerst.; Pasania omalokos (Korth.) Schottky; Synaedrys omalokos (Korth.) Koidz.; Lithocarpus omalokos (Korth.) Rehder

= Lithocarpus lucidus =

Species of tree

Lithocarpus lucidus is a tree in the beech family Fagaceae. The specific epithet lucidus means 'shining', referring to the acorn and leaf surface.

== Description ==
Lithocarpus lucidus grows as a tree up to 50 metres (160 ft) tall with a trunk diameter of up to 120 cm (50 in) and buttresses measuring up to 1 metre (3 ft) high. The brown bark is smooth. Its coriaceous leaves measure up to 16 cm (6 in) long. The brown purplish acorns are ovoid and measure up to 3.5 cm (1 in) across.

== Distribution and habitat ==
Lithocarpus lucidus grows naturally in Thailand, Peninsular Malaysia, Singapore, Sumatra and Borneo. Its habitat is mixed dipterocarp to montane forests up to 1,400 m (5,000 ft) elevation.

== Uses ==
The timber is locally used in construction.
