= Lithocarpus leptogyne =

Conservation status
- Least Concern (IUCN 3.1)

Scientific classification
- Kingdom: Plantae
- Clade: Tracheophytes
- Clade: Angiosperms
- Clade: Eudicots
- Clade: Rosids
- Order: Fagales
- Family: Fagaceae
- Genus: Lithocarpus
- Species: L. leptogyne

Binomial name
- Lithocarpus leptogyne (Korth.) Soepadmo

Synonyms
- Cyclobalanus leptogyne (Korth.) Oerst.; Quercus leptogyne Korth.

Species of tree

Lithocarpus leptogyne is a tree in the beech family Fagaceae. The specific epithet leptogyne is from the Greek, referring to the slender female flower.

== Description ==
Lithocarpus leptogyne grows as a tree up to 40 metres (130 ft) tall with a trunk diameter of up to 90 cm (40 in) and buttresses measuring up to 1.5 metres (5 ft) high. The greyish bark is smooth or lenticellate. Its coriaceous leaves are tomentose and measure up to 19 cm (7 in) long. The flowers are solitary along the rachis. The conical acorns are brown to purple and measure up to 2 cm (1 in) long.

== Distribution and habitat ==
Lithocarpus leptogyne grows naturally in Peninsular Malaysia, Sumatra and Borneo. Its habitat is mixed dipterocarp to montane forests up to 1,800 m (6,000 ft) elevation.
