= Lithocarpus hallieri =

Scientific classification
- Kingdom: Plantae
- Clade: Tracheophytes
- Clade: Angiosperms
- Clade: Eudicots
- Clade: Rosids
- Order: Fagales
- Family: Fagaceae
- Genus: Lithocarpus
- Species: L. hallieri

Binomial name
- Lithocarpus hallieri (Seemen) A.Camus

Synonyms
- Quercus hallieri Seemen; Synaedrys hallieri (Seemen) Koidz.

Species of tree

Lithocarpus hallieri is a tree in the beech family Fagaceae. It is named for the German botanist Johannes Gottfried Hallier.

== Description ==
Lithocarpus hallieri grows as a tree up to 45 metres (150 ft) tall with a trunk diameter of up to 90 cm (40 in). The greyish brown bark is smooth, flaky or lenticellate. Its coriaceous leaves measure up to 24 cm (9 in) long. The brown acorns are roundish and measure up to 4.5 cm (2 in) across.

== Distribution and habitat ==
Lithocarpus hallieri is endemic to Borneo. Its habitat is mixed dipterocarp to montane forests from 400 m (1,000 ft) to 2,600 m (9,000 ft) elevation.
