= Lithocarpus blumeanus =

Conservation status
- Least Concern (IUCN 3.1)

Scientific classification
- Kingdom: Plantae
- Clade: Tracheophytes
- Clade: Angiosperms
- Clade: Eudicots
- Clade: Rosids
- Order: Fagales
- Family: Fagaceae
- Genus: Lithocarpus
- Species: L. blumeanus

Binomial name
- Lithocarpus blumeanus (Korth.) Rehder

Synonyms
- Castanopsis blumeana (Korth.) Rehder; Cyclobalanus blumeana (Korth.) Oerst.; Pasania blumeana (Korth.) Gamble; Quercus blumeana Korth.; Synaedrys blumeana (Korth.) Koidz.

Species of tree

Lithocarpus blumeanus is a tree in the beech family Fagaceae. It is named for the German-Dutch botanist Carl Ludwig Blume.

== Description ==
Lithocarpus blumeanus grows as a tree up to 15 metres (50 ft) tall with a trunk diameter of up to 25 cm (10 in). The greyish brown bark is scaly. The coriaceous leaves measure up to 16 cm (6 in) long. Its acorns are ovoid and measure up to 3 cm (1.2 in) long.

== Distribution and habitat ==
Lithocarpus blumeanus grows naturally in Peninsular Thailand, Borneo and Peninsular Malaysia. Its habitat is dipterocarp to lower montane forests up to 1,600 m (5,000 ft) elevation.
