= Lithocarpus dasystachyus =

Conservation status
- Least Concern (IUCN 3.1)

Scientific classification
- Kingdom: Plantae
- Clade: Embryophytes
- Clade: Tracheophytes
- Clade: Spermatophytes
- Clade: Angiosperms
- Clade: Eudicots
- Clade: Rosids
- Order: Fagales
- Family: Fagaceae
- Genus: Lithocarpus
- Species: L. dasystachyus

Binomial name
- Lithocarpus dasystachyus (Miq.) Rehder

Synonyms
- Lithocarpus winklerianus (Schottky) A.Camus; Pasania dasystachya (Miq.) Schottky; Pasania winkleriana Schottky; Quercus dasystachya Miq.; Quercus winkleriana (Schottky) Merr.; Synaedrys dasystachya (Miq.) Koidz.

Species of tree

Lithocarpus dasystachyus is a species of tree in the family Fagaceae.

The species was first described as Quercus dasystachya by Friedrich Anton Wilhelm Miquel in 1864. The specific epithet dasystachya means 'thickly hairy spike', referring to the inflorescence. In 1919 Alfred Rehder placed the species in genus Lithocarpus as L. dasystachyus.

== Description ==
Lithocarpus dasystachyus grows as a tree up to 20 metres (70 ft) tall with a trunk diameter of up to 30 cm (12 in). The greyish brown bark is smooth, flaky or fissured. The coriaceous leaves measure up to 19 cm (7 in) long. Its dark brown acorns are ovoid to conical and measure up to 1.7 cm (0.7 in) across.

== Distribution and habitat ==
Lithocarpus dasystachyus is endemic to Borneo. Its habitat is peat swamp and kerangas forests, sometimes hill dipterocarp forests, up to 1,000 m (3,300 ft) elevation.

== Conservation ==
Lithocarpus dasystachyus has been assessed as least concern on the IUCN Red List. Its region has seen deforestation and conversion of land for farming and urban development. The species is sometimes logged and locally harvested for firewood. It is not known to be in any protected areas.
