= Driessenia =

Scientific classification
- Kingdom: Plantae
- Clade: Tracheophytes
- Clade: Angiosperms
- Clade: Eudicots
- Clade: Rosids
- Order: Myrtales
- Family: Melastomataceae
- Genus: Driessenia; Korth.

Genus of plants

Driessenia is a genus of flowering plants belonging to the family Melastomataceae.

Its native range is Western and Central Malesia.

The genus name is in honour of Peter van Driessen (1753–1828), Dutch doctor, pharmacist, chemist and botanist.

Species:

- Driessenia aequiappendiculata C.Hansen
- Driessenia attenuata C.Hansen
- Driessenia axantha Korth.
- Driessenia ciliata Becc. ex Cogn.
- Driessenia dispar (Cogn.) C.Hansen
- Driessenia ferox Bakh.f.
- Driessenia glanduligera Stapf
- Driessenia grandithyrsa C.Hansen
- Driessenia hepaticoides C.Hansen
- Driessenia inaequalifolia Nayar
- Driessenia kemoelensis Nayar
- Driessenia microthrix Stapf
- Driessenia minutiflora O.Schwartz
- Driessenia ohwiana Nayar
- Driessenia phasmolacuna C.W.Lin
- Driessenia planopetiolata C.Hansen
- Driessenia sessiliflora C.Hansen
- Driessenia teysmannii Cogn. ex Boerl.
- Driessenia winkleri Cogn.
