= Salix rupifraga =

Scientific classification
- Kingdom: Plantae
- Clade: Tracheophytes
- Clade: Angiosperms
- Clade: Eudicots
- Clade: Rosids
- Order: Malpighiales
- Family: Salicaceae
- Genus: Salix
- Species: S. rupifraga

Binomial name
- Salix rupifraga Koidz.

Species of willow

Salix rupifraga (Japanese: コマイワヤナギ, romanized: Komaifuyanagi) is a species of willow native to mountains of Honshū, Japan. It is a deciduous shrub.
