= Lithocarpus bullatus =

Conservation status
- Least Concern (IUCN 3.1)

Scientific classification
- Kingdom: Plantae
- Clade: Tracheophytes
- Clade: Angiosperms
- Clade: Eudicots
- Clade: Rosids
- Order: Fagales
- Family: Fagaceae
- Genus: Lithocarpus
- Species: L. bullatus

Binomial name
- Lithocarpus bullatus Hatus. ex Soepadmo

Species of tree

Lithocarpus bullatus is a tree in the beech family Fagaceae. The specific epithet bullatus means 'blistered', referring to the leaf surface.

== Description ==
Lithocarpus bullatus grows as a tree up to 25 metres (80 ft) tall with a trunk diameter of up to 40 cm (16 in). The greyish brown bark is smooth or fissured or lenticellate. The coriaceous leaves measure up to 7 cm (3 in) long. Its dark brown acorns are ovoid to conical and measure up to 2 cm (0.8 in) across.

== Distribution and habitat ==
Lithocarpus bullatus is endemic to Borneo. Its habitat is montane forests from 1,500 m (5,000 ft) to 3,000 m (10,000 ft) elevation.
