= Lithocarpus hatusimae =

Conservation status
- Near Threatened (IUCN 3.1)

Scientific classification
- Kingdom: Plantae
- Clade: Tracheophytes
- Clade: Angiosperms
- Clade: Eudicots
- Clade: Rosids
- Order: Fagales
- Family: Fagaceae
- Genus: Lithocarpus
- Species: L. hatusimae

Binomial name
- Lithocarpus hatusimae Soepadmo

Species of tree

Lithocarpus hatusimae is a tree in the family Fagaceae. It is endemic to western Borneo.

== Description ==
Lithocarpus hatusimae grows as a tree up to 20 metres (70 ft) tall with a trunk diameter of up to 35 cm (10 in). The greyish brown bark is smooth or fissured. Its coriaceous leaves measure up to 18 cm (7 in) long. The dark brown acorns are ovoid to conical and measure up to 2.2 cm (1 in) across.

== Taxonomy ==
Lithocarpus hatusimae was first described by Engkik Soepadmo in Reinwardtia in 1970. The type specimen was collected on Mount Kinabalu, in Sabah. The species is named for the Japanese botanist Sumihiko Hatusima.

== Distribution and habitat ==
Lithocarpus hatusimae is endemic to Borneo. Its habitat is mixed dipterocarp (including kerangas) to montane forests from 800 m (3,000 ft) to 2,200 m (7,000 ft) elevation.

== Conservation ==
Lithocarpus hatusimae has been assessed as near threatened on the IUCN Red List. It is threatened by logging and by conversion of land for farming and urban development. However the species is in a number of protected areas in Sarawak and Sabah.
