= Lithocarpus conocarpus =

Conservation status
- Least Concern (IUCN 3.1)

Scientific classification
- Kingdom: Plantae
- Clade: Tracheophytes
- Clade: Angiosperms
- Clade: Eudicots
- Clade: Rosids
- Order: Fagales
- Family: Fagaceae
- Genus: Lithocarpus
- Species: L. conocarpus

Binomial name
- Lithocarpus conocarpus (Oudem.) Rehder

Synonyms
- Cyclobalanus conocarpa (Oudem.) Oerst.; Pasania conocarpa (Oudem.) Oerst. ex Schottky; Quercus conocarpa Oudem.; Synaedrys conocarpa (Oudem.) Koidz.

Species of tree

Lithocarpus conocarpus is a tree in the beech family Fagaceae. The specific epithet conocarpus means 'cone fruit', referring to the acorn shape.

== Description ==
Lithocarpus conocarpus grows as a tree up to 45 metres (150 ft) tall with a trunk diameter of up to 90 cm (40 in). The greyish brown bark is scaly. The coriaceous leaves measure up to 11 cm (4 in) long. Its dark brown acorns are conical or ovoid and measure up to 2 cm (0.8 in) across.

== Distribution and habitat ==
Lithocarpus conocarpus grows naturally in Sumatra, Peninsular Malaysia, Singapore, Java and Borneo. Its habitat is lowland to lower montane forests up to 1,400 m (5,000 ft) elevation.

== Uses ==
The timber is used locally in home construction.
