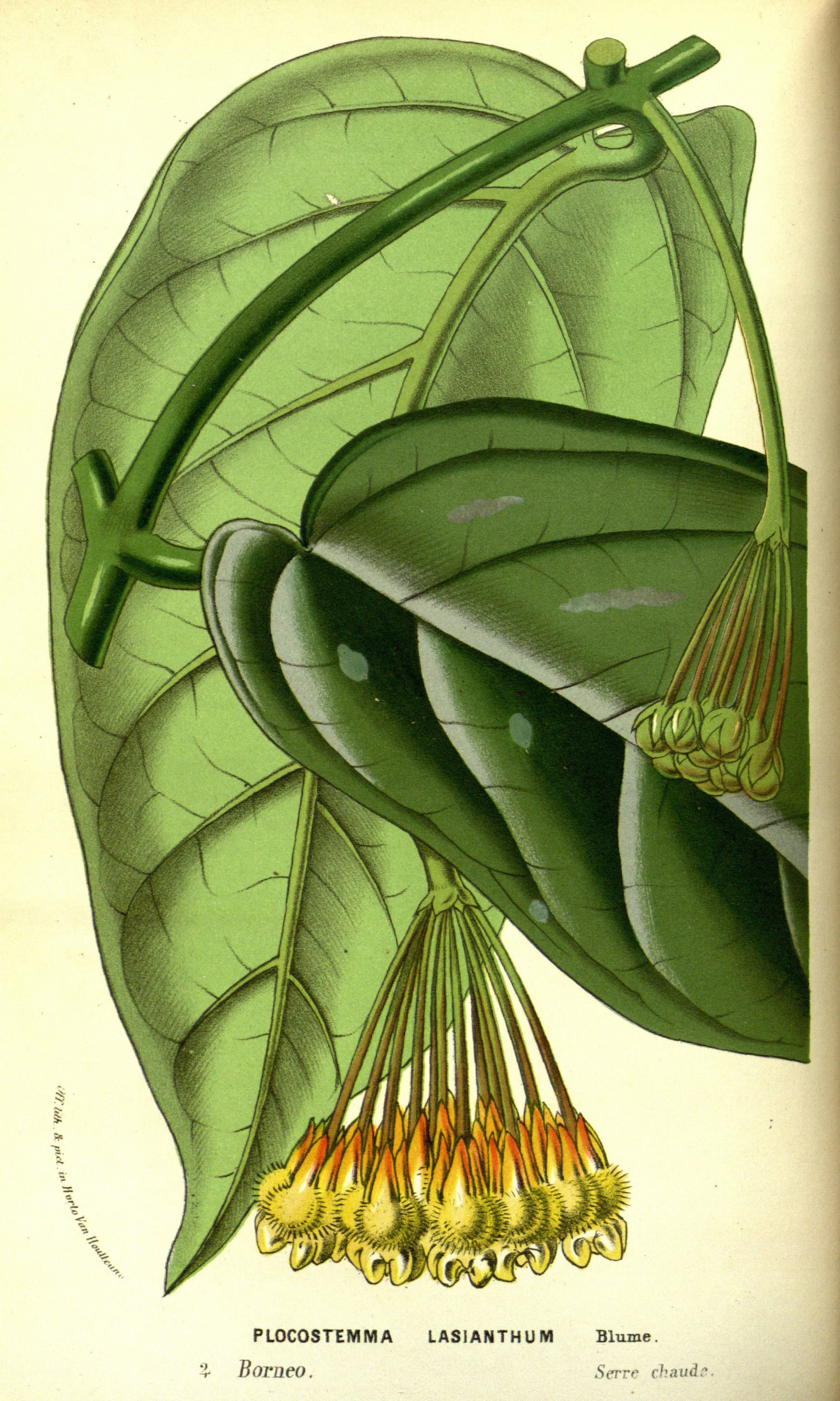
- Botanical illustration

Scientific classification
- Kingdom: Plantae
- Clade: Tracheophytes
- Clade: Angiosperms
- Clade: Eudicots
- Clade: Asterids
- Order: Gentianales
- Family: Apocynaceae
- Genus: Hoya
- Species: H. lasiantha

Binomial name
- Hoya lasiantha Korth. ex Blume

Synonyms
- Hoya praetorii Miq.; Plocostemma lasianthum Blume; Plocostemma pallidum Blume

= Hoya lasiantha =

Species of plant

Hoya lasiantha is a species of flowering plant in the family Apocynaceae. It is native to Thailand, and western and central Malesia. An epiphytic shrub, it is typically found in the wet tropics. As an ornamental with pendant flowers it is suitable for hanging baskets.
