= Lithocarpus bennettii =

Conservation status
- Least Concern (IUCN 3.1)

Scientific classification
- Kingdom: Plantae
- Clade: Tracheophytes
- Clade: Angiosperms
- Clade: Eudicots
- Clade: Rosids
- Order: Fagales
- Family: Fagaceae
- Genus: Lithocarpus
- Species: L. bennettii

Binomial name
- Lithocarpus bennettii (Miq.) Rehder

Synonyms
- Cyclobalanus bennettii (Miq.) Oerst.; Pasania bennettii (Miq.) Gamble; Quercus bennettii Miq.; Quercus miqueliana Scheff.; Synaedrys bennettii (Miq.) Koidz.

Species of tree

Lithocarpus bennettii is a tree in the family Fagaceae. It is native to Southeast Asia.

== Description ==
Lithocarpus bennettii grows as a tree up to 35 m (110 ft) tall with a trunk diameter of up to 80 cm (30 in). The greyish brown bark is smooth or fissured. The coriaceous leaves measure up to 12 cm (5 in) long. Its dark purplish brown acorns are ovoid to conical and measure up to 2 cm (0.8 in) long.

== Taxonomy ==
Lithocarpus bennettii was initially described as Quercus bennettii by Dutch botanist Friedrich Anton Wilhelm Miquel in Flora van Nederlandsch Indie (Flora of the Dutch East Indies) in 1856. In 1919, Alfred Rehder transferred the species to the genus Lithocarpus. The type specimen was collected on Bangka Island, off Sumatra. The specific epithet honours the English botanist John Joseph Bennett.

== Distribution and habitat ==
Lithocarpus bennettii is native to Thailand, Borneo, Peninsular Malaysia, Singapore and Sumatra. Its habitat is dipterocarp and kerangas forests at 200–1,200 m (1,000–4,000 ft) elevation.

== Conservation ==
Lithocarpus bennettii has been assessed as least concern on the IUCN Red List. Its region has seen deforestation and conversion of land for farming and urban development. The species is sometimes harvested for local use. It is not known to be in any protected areas. The species has been assessed as critically endangered in Singapore.

== Uses ==
Lithocarpus bennettii is used in construction and as a furniture material. The species is also harvested for firewood.
