= Lithocarpus clementianus =

Scientific classification
- Kingdom: Plantae
- Clade: Tracheophytes
- Clade: Angiosperms
- Clade: Eudicots
- Clade: Rosids
- Order: Fagales
- Family: Fagaceae
- Genus: Lithocarpus
- Species: L. clementianus

Binomial name
- Lithocarpus clementianus (King ex Hook.f.) A.Camus

Synonyms
- Pasania clementiana (King ex Hook.f.) Gamble; Quercus clementiana King ex Hook.f.; Synaedrys clementiana (King ex Hook.f.) Koidz.

Species of tree

Lithocarpus clementianus is a tree in the beech family Fagaceae. It is named for Governor Cecil Clementi Smith of the Straits Settlements (former British territories in Malaya).

== Description ==
Lithocarpus clementianus grows as a tree up to 36 metres (120 ft) tall with a trunk diameter of up to 70 cm (30 in). The brownish bark is fissured or cracked. The coriaceous leaves measure up to 19 cm (7 in) long. Its purplish acorns are roundish and measure up to 1.5 cm (0.6 in) across.

== Distribution and habitat ==
Lithocarpus clementianus grows naturally in southern Thailand, Peninsular Malaysia and Borneo. Its habitat is hill dipterocarp to lower montane forests up to 1,800 m (6,000 ft) elevation.
