= Lithocarpus lampadarius =

Conservation status
- Near Threatened (IUCN 3.1)

Scientific classification
- Kingdom: Plantae
- Clade: Tracheophytes
- Clade: Angiosperms
- Clade: Eudicots
- Clade: Rosids
- Order: Fagales
- Family: Fagaceae
- Genus: Lithocarpus
- Species: L. lampadarius

Binomial name
- Lithocarpus lampadarius (Gamble) A.Camus

Synonyms
- Pasania lampadaria Gamble; Quercus lampadaria (Gamble) Burkill; Synaedrys lampadaria (Gamble) Koidz.

Species of tree

Lithocarpus lampadarius is a tree in the beech family Fagaceae. It is native to Borneo and Peninsular Malaysia.

== Description ==
Lithocarpus lampadarius grows as a tree up to 36 m (120 ft) tall with a trunk diameter of up to 100 cm (40 in). The brown bark is scaly or fissured. Its coriaceous leaves measure up to 38 cm (15 in) long. The dark brown acorns are ovoid to roundish and measure up to 3.5 cm (1.4 in) across.

== Taxonomy ==
The species was first described as Pasania lampadaria by James Sykes Gamble in 1914. The specific epithet lampadaria is from the Greek lampas meaning 'torch', referring to the use of its twigs as torches for fishing in Peninsular Malaysia. In 1931 Aimée Antoinette Camus placed the species in the genus Lithocarpus as L. lampadarius.

== Distribution and habitat ==
Lithocarpus lampadarius is native to Peninsular Malaysia and Borneo. Its habitat is mixed dipterocarp to montane forests, from 300–2,000 m (1,000–7,000 ft) elevation.

== Conservation ==
Lithocarpus lampadarius has been assessed as near threatened on the IUCN Red List. It is threatened by logging and by conversion of land for farming and urban development. The species is present in protected areas in Sabah. It is considered critically endangered in Sarawak.
