= Lithocarpus perakensis =

Conservation status
- Endangered (IUCN 3.1)

Scientific classification
- Kingdom: Plantae
- Clade: Tracheophytes
- Clade: Angiosperms
- Clade: Eudicots
- Clade: Rosids
- Order: Fagales
- Family: Fagaceae
- Genus: Lithocarpus
- Species: L. perakensis

Binomial name
- Lithocarpus perakensis Soepadmo (1970)

Synonyms
- Lithocarpus costatus var. kingii A.Camus; Lithocarpus kingii (A.Camus) Whitmore

Species of tree

Lithocarpus perakensis, synonyms including Lithocarpus kingii, is a species of plant in the family Fagaceae. It is a medium-sized tree endemic to Peninsular Malaysia. It grows on exposed sites in evergreen rain forests from 90 to 1,200 metres elevation. It is threatened by habitat loss.
