= Quercus dolicholepis =

Conservation status
- Least Concern (IUCN 3.1)

Scientific classification
- Kingdom: Plantae
- Clade: Embryophytes
- Clade: Tracheophytes
- Clade: Spermatophytes
- Clade: Angiosperms
- Clade: Eudicots
- Clade: Rosids
- Order: Fagales
- Family: Fagaceae
- Genus: Quercus
- Subgenus: Quercus subg. Cerris
- Section: Quercus sect. Ilex
- Species: Q. dolicholepis

Binomial name
- Quercus dolicholepis A.Camus

Synonyms
- Quercus dolicholepis var. elliptica (Y.C.Hsu & H.Wei Jen) Y.C.Hsu & H.Wei Jen; Quercus spathulata Seemen (1897), non Watelet (1866), fossil name.; Quercus spathulata var. elliptica Y.C.Hsu & H.Wei Jen

Species of flowering plant

Quercus dolicholepis is a species of oak. It is a tree native to central and south-central China.

The species was named by Aimée Antoinette Camus in 1953.
