= Quercus braianensis =

Conservation status
- Vulnerable (IUCN 3.1)

Scientific classification
- Kingdom: Plantae
- Clade: Embryophytes
- Clade: Tracheophytes
- Clade: Spermatophytes
- Clade: Angiosperms
- Clade: Eudicots
- Clade: Rosids
- Order: Fagales
- Family: Fagaceae
- Genus: Quercus
- Subgenus: Quercus subg. Cerris
- Section: Quercus sect. Cyclobalanopsis
- Species: Q. braianensis

Binomial name
- Quercus braianensis A.Camus

Synonyms
- Quercus erioclada A.Camus

Species of oak tree

Quercus braianensis is a tree species in the beech family Fagaceae. There are no known subspecies. It is placed in subgenus Cerris, section Cyclobalanopsis.

The species appears to be endemic to Central Vietnam, where it may be called sồi Braian. The tree grows up to 28 m tall, at elevations from 900 to 2000 m.
