= Lithocarpus revolutus =

Conservation status
- Endangered (IUCN 3.1)

Scientific classification
- Kingdom: Plantae
- Clade: Tracheophytes
- Clade: Angiosperms
- Clade: Eudicots
- Clade: Rosids
- Order: Fagales
- Family: Fagaceae
- Genus: Lithocarpus
- Species: L. revolutus

Binomial name
- Lithocarpus revolutus Hatus. ex Soepadmo (1970)

Species of tree

Lithocarpus revolutus is a tree in the beech family Fagaceae. It is native to Borneo and Peninsular Thailand.

The species was first formally described by Engkik Soepadmo in 1970. The name is derived from the way in which the margins of the leaves are typically rolled in upon themselves (revolute). Trees in genus Lithocarpus are commonly known as the stone oaks and differ from Quercus primarily because they produce insect-pollinated flowers.

== Description ==
Lithocarpus revolutus are often smallish trees up to 12 metres (40 ft) tall with a trunk diameter of up to 30 cm (12 in). The thick and coriaceous leaves are glabrous and distinctive because the margins are typically rolled in towards the midrib on the leaf's underside. The leaves can be large, measuring up to 20 cm (8 in) long and are obovate and the same color on both the upper and lower sides (concolorous).

The fruits are large (4-5 cm long and equally large across) and sessile along the thick fruiting rachis. The nuts are glabrous and the fruit wall can be quite thick and woody. The cupules cover only the lower part of the nut and are flat and saucer shaped with relatively obscure squamose or muricate scales densely arranged on the outer surface.

== Distribution and habitat ==
Lithocarpus revolutus is native to Peninsular Thailand and western Borneo. It is a large tree native to primarily lowland mixed dipterocarp rain forests, kerangas forests, and lower montane forests from 50 to 1,800 metres elevation.
