= Lithocarpus beccarianus =

Conservation status
- Near Threatened (IUCN 3.1)

Scientific classification
- Kingdom: Plantae
- Clade: Tracheophytes
- Clade: Angiosperms
- Clade: Eudicots
- Clade: Rosids
- Order: Fagales
- Family: Fagaceae
- Genus: Lithocarpus
- Species: L. beccarianus

Binomial name
- Lithocarpus beccarianus (Benth.) A.Camus

Synonyms
- Pasania beccariana (Benth.) Prantl; Quercus beccariana Benth.; Synaedrys beccariana (Benth.) Koidz.

Species of tree

Lithocarpus beccarianus is a tree in the beech family Fagaceae. It is named for the Italian botanist Odoardo Beccari.

== Description ==
Lithocarpus beccarianus grows as a tree up to 30 metres (100 ft) tall with a trunk diameter of up to 60 cm (24 in). The brown bark is scaly. The coriaceous leaves measure up to 12 cm (5 in) long. Its brown acorns are ellipsoid and measure up to 6 cm (2.4 in) long.

== Distribution and habitat ==
Lithocarpus beccarianus is endemic to Borneo. Its habitat is lowland dipterocarp rain forests up to 300 m (1,000 ft) elevation.
