= Lithocarpus echinulatus =

Scientific classification
- Kingdom: Plantae
- Clade: Tracheophytes
- Clade: Angiosperms
- Clade: Eudicots
- Clade: Rosids
- Order: Fagales
- Family: Fagaceae
- Genus: Lithocarpus
- Species: L. echinulatus

Binomial name
- Lithocarpus echinulatus Soepadmo

Species of tree

Lithocarpus echinulatus is a tree in the beech family Fagaceae. The specific epithet echinulatus means 'having short spines', referring to the cupule.

== Description ==
Lithocarpus echinulatus grows as a buttressed tree up to 40 metres (130 ft) tall with a trunk diameter of up to 80 cm (30 in). The brownish bark is smooth. The coriaceous leaves measure up to 22 cm (9 in) long. Its brown acorns are roundish and measure up to 3.3 cm (1.3 in) across.

== Distribution and habitat ==
Lithocarpus echinulatus is endemic to Borneo. Its habitat is lowland dipterocarp forests, generally by rivers, up to 400 m (1,300 ft) elevation.
