= Lithocarpus confertus =

Scientific classification
- Kingdom: Plantae
- Clade: Tracheophytes
- Clade: Angiosperms
- Clade: Eudicots
- Clade: Rosids
- Order: Fagales
- Family: Fagaceae
- Genus: Lithocarpus
- Species: L. confertus

Binomial name
- Lithocarpus confertus Soepadmo

Species of tree

Lithocarpus confertus is a tree in the beech family Fagaceae. The specific epithet confertus means 'crowded', referring to the inflorescences and infructescences.

== Description ==
Lithocarpus confertus grows as a tree up to 30 metres (100 ft) tall with a trunk diameter of up to 60 cm (24 in). The greyish brown bark is scaly or lenticellate. The coriaceous leaves measure up to 12 cm (5 in) long. Its dark brown or purplish acorns are ovoid and measure up to 1 cm (0.4 in) across.

== Distribution and habitat ==
Lithocarpus confertus is endemic to Borneo. Its habitat is dipterocarp, peat swamp and lower montane forests from 900 m (3,000 ft) to 1,200 m (3,900 ft) elevation.
