= Lithocarpus brochidodromus =

Conservation status
- Least Concern (IUCN 3.1)

Scientific classification
- Kingdom: Plantae
- Clade: Tracheophytes
- Clade: Angiosperms
- Clade: Eudicots
- Clade: Rosids
- Order: Fagales
- Family: Fagaceae
- Genus: Lithocarpus
- Species: L. brochidodromus

Binomial name
- Lithocarpus brochidodromus S.Julia & Soepadmo

Species of tree

Lithocarpus brochidodromus is a tree in the beech family Fagaceae. The specific epithet brochidodromus means 'loop-veined', referring to the leaves.

== Description ==
Lithocarpus brochidodromus grows as a tree up to 30 metres (100 ft) tall with a trunk diameter of up to 55 cm (20 in). The flaky bark is greyish or brownish. Its coriaceous leaves measure up to 32 cm (13 in) long. The flowers are solitary on the rachis. Its brown acorns are ovoid to roundish and measure up to 2 cm (0.8 in) across.

== Distribution and habitat ==
Lithocarpus brochidodromus is endemic to Borneo. Its habitat is mixed dipterocarp forests, including along rivers, to 620 m (2,000 ft) elevation.

== Conservation ==
Lithocarpus brochidodromus has been assessed as least concern on the IUCN Red List. Its population is considered stable as the species occurs mostly in protected areas. Felling of this species is prohibited in Sabah.
