= Lithocarpus meijeri =

Conservation status
- Least Concern (IUCN 3.1)

Scientific classification
- Kingdom: Plantae
- Clade: Embryophytes
- Clade: Tracheophytes
- Clade: Spermatophytes
- Clade: Angiosperms
- Clade: Eudicots
- Clade: Rosids
- Order: Fagales
- Family: Fagaceae
- Genus: Lithocarpus
- Species: L. meijeri

Binomial name
- Lithocarpus meijeri Soepadmo

Species of tree

Lithocarpus meijeri is a tree in the beech family Fagaceae. It is native to Borneo.

The species was first described by Engkik Soepadmo in 1970. It is named for the Dutch botanist Willem Meijer.

== Description ==
Lithocarpus meijeri grows as a tree up to 40 metres (130 ft) tall with a trunk diameter of up to 100 cm (40 in). The reddish brown to greyish bark is smooth or fissured or scaly. Its coriaceous leaves measure up to 20 cm (8 in) long. The brown acorns are ovoid and measure up to 3 cm (1 in) long.

== Distribution and habitat ==
Lithocarpus meijeri is native to Borneo, with some unconfirmed collections on Sumatra. It grows in primary hill mixed dipterocarp rain forest, including kerangas forest, often on steep hillsides, up to 1,100 m (4,000 ft) elevation.
