= Lithocarpus corneri =

Conservation status
- Data Deficient (IUCN 3.1)

Scientific classification
- Kingdom: Plantae
- Clade: Embryophytes
- Clade: Tracheophytes
- Clade: Spermatophytes
- Clade: Angiosperms
- Clade: Eudicots
- Clade: Rosids
- Order: Fagales
- Family: Fagaceae
- Genus: Lithocarpus
- Species: L. corneri

Binomial name
- Lithocarpus corneri S.Julia & Soepadmo

Species of tree

Lithocarpus corneri is a tree in the beech family Fagaceae. It is named for the English botanist E. J. H. Corner.

== Description ==
Lithocarpus corneri grows as a tree up to 15 metres (50 ft) tall with a trunk diameter of up to 30 cm (10 in). The brown bark is rough. Its coriaceous leaves are yellowish tomentose and measure up to 12 cm (5 in) long. The flowers are solitary on the rachis. Its brown acorns are obconic and measure up to 5 cm (2 in) long.

== Distribution and habitat ==
Lithocarpus corneri is endemic to Borneo where it is known only from Sabah. Its habitat is hillside forests from 500 to 650 meters elevation. It grows in Gunung Lumaku Forest Reserve and Trusmadi Forest Reserve.
