= Lithocarpus kalkmanii =

Scientific classification
- Kingdom: Plantae
- Clade: Tracheophytes
- Clade: Angiosperms
- Clade: Eudicots
- Clade: Rosids
- Order: Fagales
- Family: Fagaceae
- Genus: Lithocarpus
- Species: L. kalkmanii

Binomial name
- Lithocarpus kalkmanii S.Julia & Soepadmo

Species of tree

Lithocarpus kalkmanii is a tree in the beech family Fagaceae. It is endemic to Borneo.

The species was first described by Sang Julia and Engkik Soepadmo in 1998. It is named for the Dutch botanist Cornelis Kalkman.

== Description ==
Lithocarpus kalkmanii grows as a tree up to 30 metres (100 ft) tall with a trunk diameter of up to 60 cm (24 in). The brownish or greyish bark is cracked or lenticellate. Its coriaceous leaves are tomentose and measure up to 15.5 cm (6 in) long. The dark brown acorns are roundish and measure up to 6 cm (2 in) across. This species produces fruits with an 'enclosed receptacle' morphology, where the seed becomes embedded in the basal tissue of the fruit as it develops. This basal material becomes woody, granular and hard and replaces the outer wall of the ovary as the mechanically protective tissue for the seed.

== Classification ==
This species probably belongs to the subgenus Eulithocarpus, based on Camus' infrageneric classification system, because of its 'ER' fruit morphology and the few widely spaced concentric lamellae on the cupule.

== Distribution and habitat ==
Lithocarpus kalkmanii is endemic to Borneo where it is known only from Sabah. Its habitat is mixed dipterocarp to montane forests from 1,000 m (3,000 ft) to 1,500 m (5,000 ft) elevation.
