= Lithocarpus andersonii =

Conservation status
- Vulnerable (IUCN 3.1)

Scientific classification
- Kingdom: Plantae
- Clade: Tracheophytes
- Clade: Angiosperms
- Clade: Eudicots
- Clade: Rosids
- Order: Fagales
- Family: Fagaceae
- Genus: Lithocarpus
- Species: L. andersonii

Binomial name
- Lithocarpus andersonii Soepadmo

Species of tree

Lithocarpus andersonii is a tree in the beech family Fagaceae. It is named for former Borneo Forest Officer James A. R. Anderson.

== Description ==
Lithocarpus andersonii grows as a tree up to 30 metres (100 ft) tall with a trunk diameter of up to 60 cm (24 in). The brownish bark is smooth. The coriaceous leaves measure up to 10 cm (4 in) long. Its purple brown acorns are ovoid to conical and measure up to 2.3 cm (0.9 in) long.

== Distribution and habitat ==
Lithocarpus andersonii is endemic to Borneo. Its habitat is lowland peat swamp and kerangas forests.
