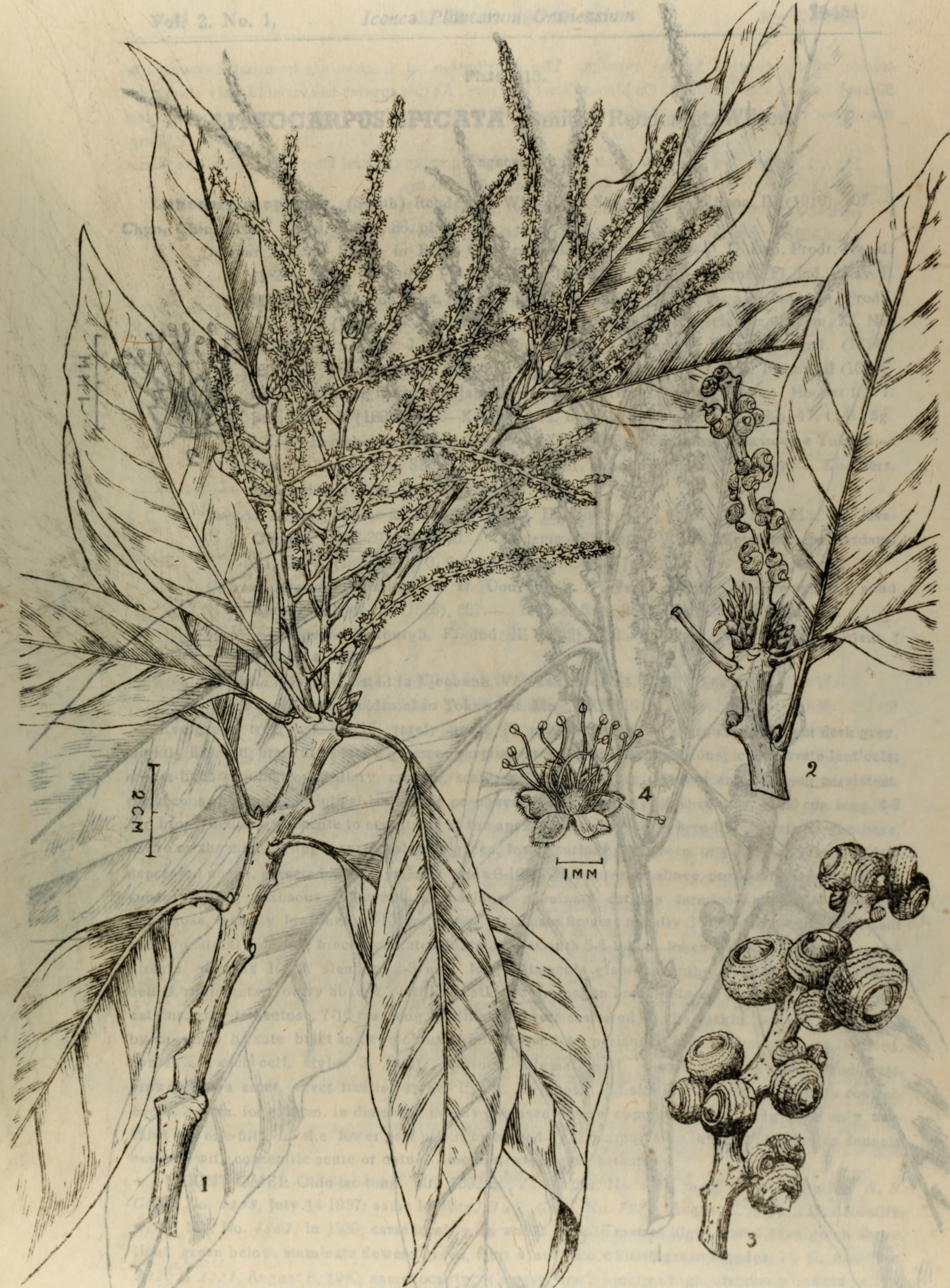
- Botanical drawing, 1945

Scientific classification
- Kingdom: Plantae
- Clade: Tracheophytes
- Clade: Angiosperms
- Clade: Eudicots
- Clade: Rosids
- Order: Fagales
- Family: Fagaceae
- Genus: Lithocarpus
- Species: L. cleistocarpus

Binomial name
- Lithocarpus cleistocarpus (Seemen) Rehder & E.H.Wilson

Synonyms
- Lithocarpus cleistocarpus var. fangiana A.Camus; Lithocarpus cleistocarpus var. omeienica W.P.Fang; Lithocarpus kiangsiensis Hu & F.H.Chen; Quercus cleistocarpa Seemen; Pasania cleistocarpa (Seemen) Schottky; Synaedrys cleistocarpa (Seemen) Koidz.; Quercus fragifera Franch.; Quercus wilsonii Seemen; Pasania wilsonii (Seemen) Schottky; Synaedrys cleistocarpa (Seemen) Koidz.; Synaedrys wilsonii (Seemen) Koidz.; Lithocarpus kiangsiensis Hu & F.H.Chen

= Lithocarpus cleistocarpus =

Species of flowering plant

Lithocarpus cleistocarpus (common name, tanbark oak) is a species of stone-oak native to China. The flowers are white, and the nuts are flat, contained in a capsule. The tree is grown as an ornamental plant.
