= Lithocarpus jacobsii =

Conservation status
- Vulnerable (IUCN 3.1)

Scientific classification
- Kingdom: Plantae
- Clade: Tracheophytes
- Clade: Angiosperms
- Clade: Eudicots
- Clade: Rosids
- Order: Fagales
- Family: Fagaceae
- Genus: Lithocarpus
- Species: L. jacobsii

Binomial name
- Lithocarpus jacobsii Soepadmo

Species of tree

Lithocarpus jacobsii is a tree in the beech family Fagaceae. It is endemic to Borneo.

The species was first described by Engkik Soepadmo in 1970. It is named for the Dutch botanist Marius Jacobs. Trees in Lithocarpus are commonly known as the stone oaks and differ from Quercus primarily because they produce insect-pollinated flowers.

== Description ==
Lithocarpus jacobsii grows as a tree up to 36 metres (120 ft) tall with a trunk diameter of up to 60 cm (24 in). The brown bark is smooth or lenticellate. The coriaceous leaves are unusual and distinctive because of their cordate base that often seems to clasp the stem on a short petiole. The oblong leaves can be quite large, measuring up to 56 cm (22 in) long and are glabrous and the same color on both the upper and lower sides (concolorous), with prominent secondary veins below and a looping marginal vein.

The infructescence can be quite long with numerous clusters of fruit scattered along the rachis. The fruits are generally in clusters of 3 (and up to 10). The cupules only cover the lower part of the nut and have squamose scales arranging loosely in cyclical series. The brown nuts are also glabrous and ovoid to roundish and measure up to 2.8 cm (1 in) across.

== Distribution and habitat ==
Lithocarpus jacobsii is endemic to Borneo. Its habitat is lowland mixed dipterocarp rain forest and lower montane forests up to 1,300 m (4,000 ft) elevation.

== Conservation ==
Lithocarpus jacobsii has been assessed as vulnerable on the IUCN Red List. It is threatened by logging and by conversion of land for farming. The species is present in protected areas in Sarawak and Sabah.

== External link ==
- iNaturalist observations
