= Lithocarpus neorobinsonii =

Conservation status
- Near Threatened (IUCN 2.3)

Scientific classification
- Kingdom: Plantae
- Clade: Tracheophytes
- Clade: Angiosperms
- Clade: Eudicots
- Clade: Rosids
- Order: Fagales
- Family: Fagaceae
- Genus: Lithocarpus
- Species: L. neorobinsonii

Binomial name
- Lithocarpus neorobinsonii A.Camus

Synonyms
- Pasania robinsonii (Ridl.) Gamble; Quercus robinsonii Ridl.; Synaedrys robinsonii (Ridl.) Koidz.

Species of tree

Lithocarpus neorobinsonii is a species of plant in the family Fagaceae. It is a tree native to Peninsular Malaysia and Peninsular Thailand. It grows in hill and submontane rain forest.

The species was first described as Quercus neorobinsonii by Henry Nicholas Ridley in 1914. In 1948 Aimée Antoinette Camus placed the species in genus Lithocarpus as L. neorobinsonii.
