= Lithocarpus luteus =

Conservation status
- Least Concern (IUCN 3.1)

Scientific classification
- Kingdom: Plantae
- Clade: Tracheophytes
- Clade: Angiosperms
- Clade: Eudicots
- Clade: Rosids
- Order: Fagales
- Family: Fagaceae
- Genus: Lithocarpus
- Species: L. luteus

Binomial name
- Lithocarpus luteus Soepadmo

Species of tree

Lithocarpus luteus is a tree in the beech family Fagaceae. It is endemic to Borneo.

The species was first described by Engkik Soepadmo in 1970. The specific epithet luteus means 'golden yellow', referring to the acorn's indumentum.

== Description ==
Lithocarpus luteus grows as a tree up to 40 metres (130 ft) tall with a trunk diameter of up to 100 cm (40 in) and buttresses measuring up to 2 metres (7 ft) high. The reddish brown bark is fissured to scaly and lenticellate. Its coriaceous leaves measure up to 27 cm (11 in) long. The brown acorns are ovoid to roundish, covered in golden yellow hairs, and measure up to 2.5 cm (1 in) across.

== Distribution and habitat ==
Lithocarpus luteus is endemic to Borneo. Its habitat is mixed dipterocarp to montane forests from 500 m (2,000 ft) to 1,800 m (6,000 ft) elevation.
