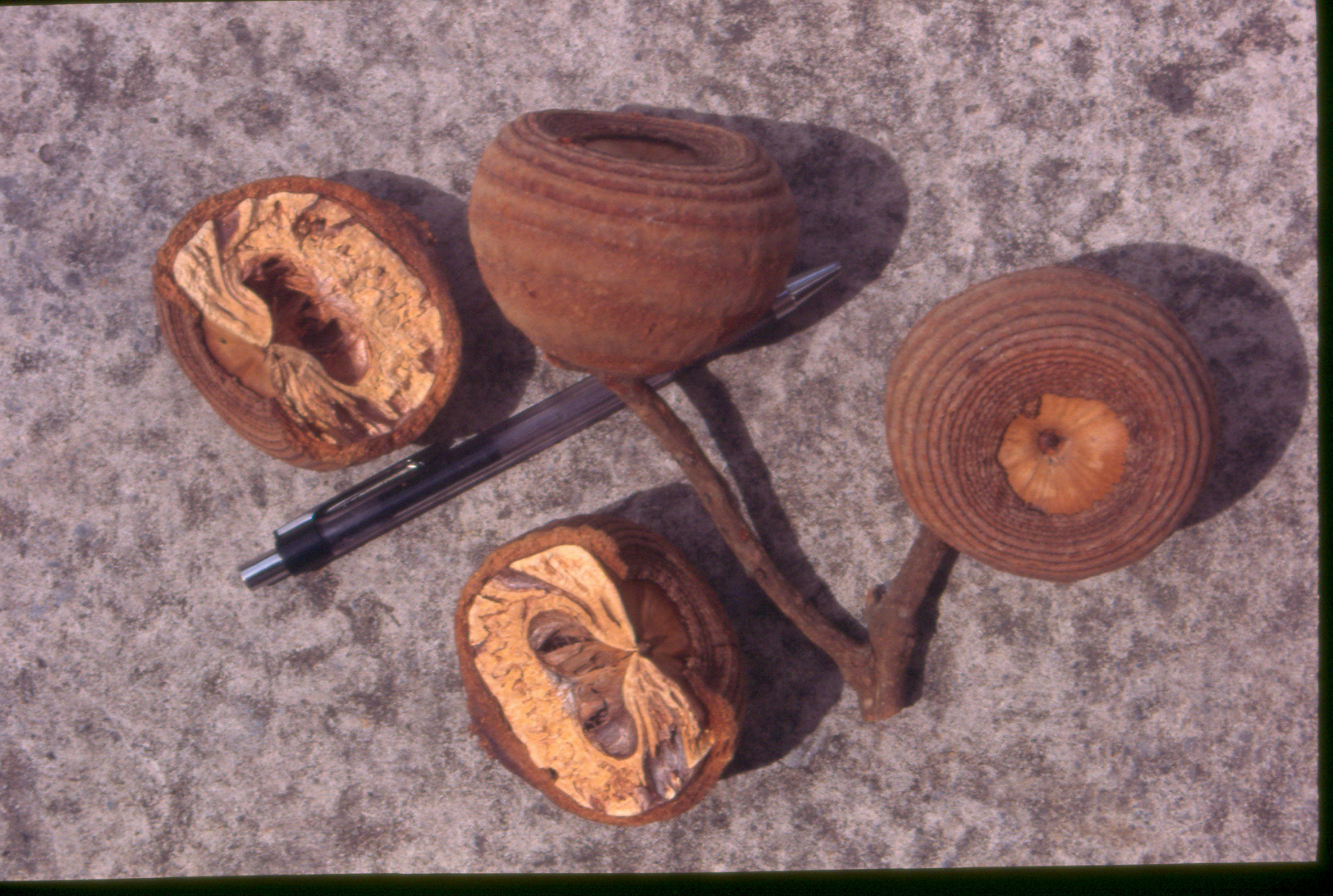
- Fruit from a Lithocarpus ruminatus tree near the research center at the Kinabalu Park HQ, Sabah, Malaysia, collected by Chuck Cannon

Scientific classification
- Kingdom: Plantae
- Clade: Tracheophytes
- Clade: Angiosperms
- Clade: Eudicots
- Clade: Rosids
- Order: Fagales
- Family: Fagaceae
- Genus: Lithocarpus
- Species: L. ruminatus

Binomial name
- Lithocarpus ruminatus Soepadmo (1970)

= Lithocarpus ruminatus =

Species of flowering plant

Lithocarpus ruminatus, the ruminate stone oak, is a species of stone oak, native to the island of Borneo.
