= Lithocarpus muluensis =

Conservation status
- Least Concern (IUCN 3.1)

Scientific classification
- Kingdom: Plantae
- Clade: Tracheophytes
- Clade: Angiosperms
- Clade: Eudicots
- Clade: Rosids
- Order: Fagales
- Family: Fagaceae
- Genus: Lithocarpus
- Species: L. muluensis

Binomial name
- Lithocarpus muluensis S.Julia & Soepadmo

Species of tree

Lithocarpus muluensis is a tree in the beech family Fagaceae. It is named for Gunung Mulu mountain in Sarawak, Borneo.

== Description ==
Lithocarpus muluensis grows as a tree up to 30 metres (100 ft) tall with a trunk diameter of up to 75 cm (30 in). The bark is flaky. Its coriaceous leaves measure up to 17 cm (7 in) long. Flowers are unknown. Its brown acorns are roundish and measure up to 2.5 cm (1 in) across.

== Distribution and habitat ==
Lithocarpus muluensis is endemic to Borneo, where it is confined to Gunung Mulu National Park in Sarawak. Its habitat is mixed dipterocarp to montane forest, up to 1,500 m (5,000 ft) elevation.
