= Lithocarpus mariae =

Conservation status
- Vulnerable (IUCN 3.1)

Scientific classification
- Kingdom: Plantae
- Clade: Tracheophytes
- Clade: Angiosperms
- Clade: Eudicots
- Clade: Rosids
- Order: Fagales
- Family: Fagaceae
- Genus: Lithocarpus
- Species: L. mariae

Binomial name
- Lithocarpus mariae Soepadmo

Species of tree

Lithocarpus mariae is a tree in the beech family Fagaceae. It is endemic to Borneo.

== Description ==
Lithocarpus mariae grows as a tree up to 35 m (110 ft) tall with a trunk diameter of up to 60 cm (24 in) and buttresses measuring up to 0.7 m (2 ft) high. Its greyish bark is smooth and lenticellate. The coriaceous leaves measure up to 13 cm (5 in) long. The flowers are solitary along the rachis. Its dark brown acorns are ovoid and measure up to 3.5 cm (1.4 in) long.

== Taxonomy ==
Lithocarpus mariae was first described by Indonesian botanist Engkik Soepadmo in 1970. The type specimen was collected at Mount Lundu in Sarawak. The specific epithet honours the Dutch botanical biographer Maria Johanna van Steenis-Kruseman.

== Distribution and habitat ==
Lithocarpus mariae is endemic to Borneo. It grows in mixed hill dipterocarp rain forest from 300–800 m (1,000–2,600 ft) elevation.

== Conservation ==
Lithocarpus mariae has been assessed as vulnerable on the IUCN Red List. It is threatened by logging and conversion of land for farming. The species is present in protected areas in Sarawak and Sabah.
