= Lithocarpus ferrugineus =

Scientific classification
- Kingdom: Plantae
- Clade: Tracheophytes
- Clade: Angiosperms
- Clade: Eudicots
- Clade: Rosids
- Order: Fagales
- Family: Fagaceae
- Genus: Lithocarpus
- Species: L. ferrugineus

Binomial name
- Lithocarpus ferrugineus Soepadmo

Species of tree

Lithocarpus ferrugineus is a tree in the beech family Fagaceae. The specific epithet ferrugineus means 'red-brown', referring to the acorn's indumentum.

== Description ==
Lithocarpus ferrugineus grows as a tree up to 30 metres (100 ft) tall with a trunk diameter of up to 50 cm (20 in). The greyish brown bark is smooth or scaly or lenticellate. Its coriaceous leaves measure up to 30 cm (12 in) long. The reddish brown acorns are ovoid and measure up to 2.3 cm (1 in) across.

== Distribution and habitat ==
Lithocarpus ferrugineus grows naturally in Peninsular Malaysia and Borneo. Its habitat is mixed dipterocarp to lower montane forests to 1,200 m (4,000 ft) elevation.
