= Lithocarpus kostermansii =

Conservation status
- Endangered (IUCN 2.3)

Scientific classification
- Kingdom: Plantae
- Clade: Tracheophytes
- Clade: Angiosperms
- Clade: Eudicots
- Clade: Rosids
- Order: Fagales
- Family: Fagaceae
- Genus: Lithocarpus
- Species: L. kostermansii

Binomial name
- Lithocarpus kostermansii Soepadmo (1970)

Species of tree

Lithocarpus kostermansii is a species of plant in the family Fagaceae. It is a tree endemic to western Java in Indonesia. It is an endangered species threatened by habitat loss.
