= Lithocarpus erythrocarpus =

Conservation status
- Vulnerable (IUCN 2.3)

Scientific classification
- Kingdom: Plantae
- Clade: Tracheophytes
- Clade: Angiosperms
- Clade: Eudicots
- Clade: Rosids
- Order: Fagales
- Family: Fagaceae
- Genus: Lithocarpus
- Species: L. erythrocarpus

Binomial name
- Lithocarpus erythrocarpus (Ridl.) A.Camus

Synonyms
- Pasania erythrocarpa Ridl.

Species of tree

Lithocarpus erythrocarpus is a species of plant in the family Fagaceae. It is a tree native to Peninsular Malaysia and Peninsular Thailand. It grows in lowland rain forest up to 900 metres elevation. It is threatened by habitat loss.
