= Aglaia soepadmoi =

Scientific classification
- Kingdom: Plantae
- Clade: Tracheophytes
- Clade: Angiosperms
- Clade: Eudicots
- Clade: Rosids
- Order: Sapindales
- Family: Meliaceae
- Genus: Aglaia
- Species: A. soepadmoi

Binomial name
- Aglaia soepadmoi Pannell

Species of tree

Aglaia soepadmoi is a tree in the family Meliaceae. It grows up to 7 metres (20 ft) tall. The fruits are roundish, up to 2 cm (1 in) in diameter. A. soepadmoi is found in Sumatra and Borneo. Habitat is forests from sea-level to 1,100 metres (3,600 ft) elevation. The tree is named for botanist and editor of Tree Flora of Sabah and Sarawak Engkik Soepadmo.
