= Lithocarpus confragosus =

Conservation status
- Near Threatened (IUCN 3.1)

Scientific classification
- Kingdom: Plantae
- Clade: Tracheophytes
- Clade: Angiosperms
- Clade: Eudicots
- Clade: Rosids
- Order: Fagales
- Family: Fagaceae
- Genus: Lithocarpus
- Species: L. confragosus

Binomial name
- Lithocarpus confragosus (King ex Hook.f.) A.Camus

Synonyms
- Pasania confragosa (King ex Hook.f.) Schottky; Quercus confragosa King ex Hook.f.

Species of flowering plant

Lithocarpus confragosus is a tree in the beech family Fagaceae. It is native to Southeast Asia.

== Description ==
Lithocarpus confragosus grows as a tree up to 30 m (100 ft) tall, with a trunk diameter of up to 65 cm (26 in). The brownish bark is smooth, scaly or lenticellate. The coriaceous leaves measure up to 18 cm (7 in) long. Its brown acorns are ovoid to roundish and measure up to 4 cm (1.6 in) across.

== Taxonomy ==
Lithocarpus confragosus was initially described as Quercus confragosa by British botanist George King in The Flora of British India in 1899. In 1931, French botanist Aimée Antoinette Camus transferred the species to the genus Lithocarpus. A specimen collected in Perak in Peninsular Malaysia was designated lectotype. The specific epithet confragosus means 'uneven', referring to the cupule wall surface.

== Distribution and habitat ==
Lithocarpus confragosus is native to Peninsular Malaysia and Borneo. Its presence in Sumatra is uncertain. Its habitat is dipterocarp forests, to 2,000 m (7,000 ft) elevation.

== Conservation ==
Lithocarpus confragosus has been assessed as near threatened on the IUCN Red List. It is threatened by deforestation and conversion of land for farming and urban development, by logging and slash-and-burn agriculture. The species is present in protected areas in Sabah, Borneo.
