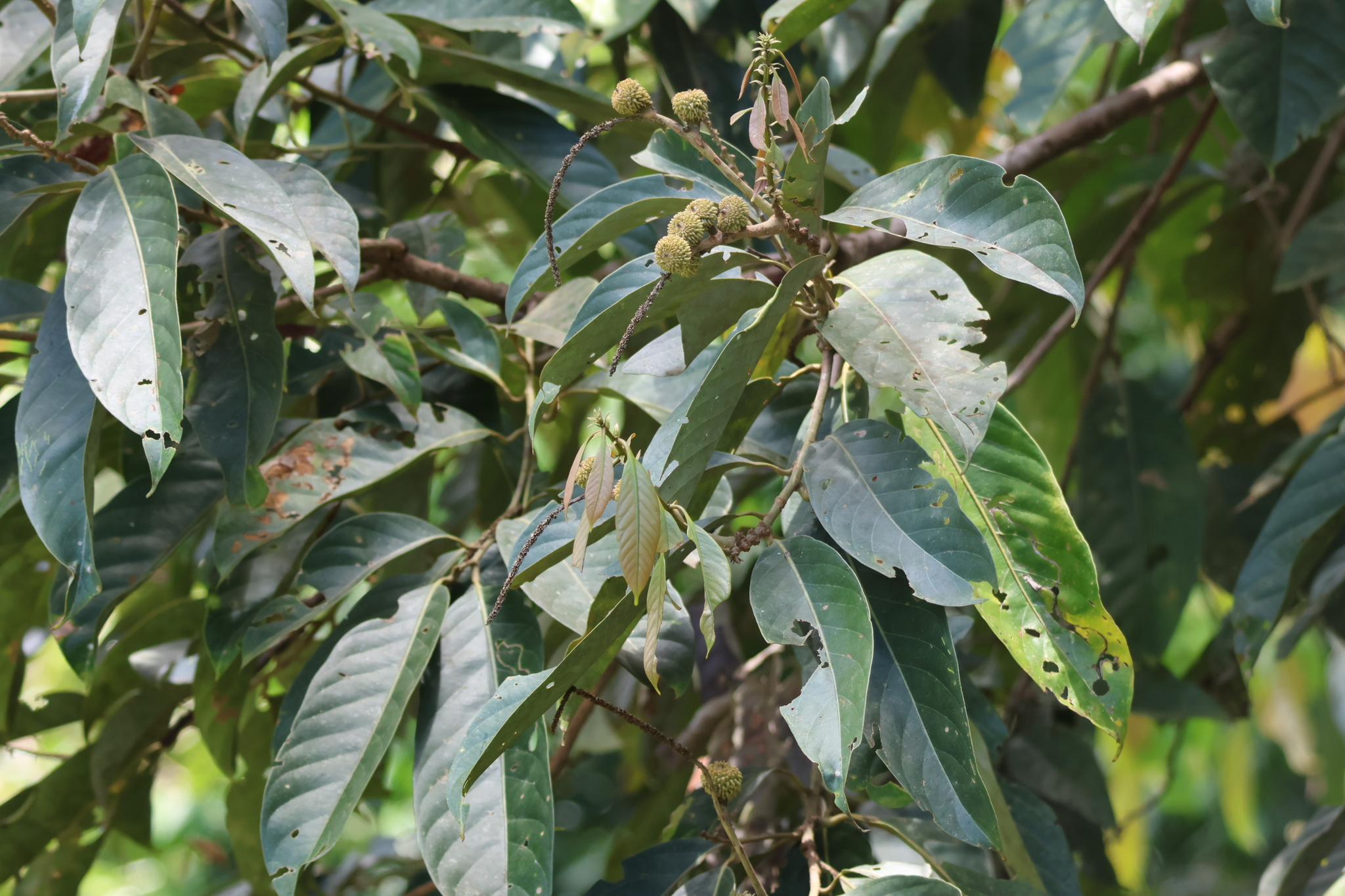

Scientific classification
- Kingdom: Plantae
- Clade: Tracheophytes
- Clade: Angiosperms
- Clade: Eudicots
- Clade: Rosids
- Order: Fagales
- Family: Fagaceae
- Genus: Lithocarpus
- Species: L. echinifer

Binomial name
- Lithocarpus echinifer (Merr.) A.Camus

Synonyms
- Quercus echinifera Merr.

= Lithocarpus echinifer =

Species of tree

Lithocarpus echinifer is a tree in the beech family Fagaceae. The specific epithet echinifer means 'having straight spines', referring to the cupule.

== Description ==
Lithocarpus echinifer grows as a tree up to 35 metres (110 ft) tall with a trunk diameter of up to 80 cm (31 in). The greyish brown bark is fissured or smooth. The coriaceous leaves measure up to 18 cm (7 in) long. Its brown acorns are almost hemispherical and measure up to 4 cm (1.6 in) across.

== Distribution and habitat ==
Lithocarpus echinifer is endemic to Borneo. Its habitat is dipterocarp forests up to 1,000 m (3,300 ft) altitude.
