= Lithocarpus keningauensis =

Scientific classification
- Kingdom: Plantae
- Clade: Tracheophytes
- Clade: Angiosperms
- Clade: Eudicots
- Clade: Rosids
- Order: Fagales
- Family: Fagaceae
- Genus: Lithocarpus
- Species: L. keningauensis

Binomial name
- Lithocarpus keningauensis S.Julia & Soepadmo

Species of tree

Lithocarpus keningauensis is a tree in the beech family Fagaceae. It is named for Keningau District in Sabah, to which the species is native.

== Description ==
Lithocarpus keningauensis grows as a tree up to 30 metres (100 ft) tall with a trunk diameter of up to 60 cm (24 in). The brown or reddish bark is scaly or fissured. Its coriaceous leaves are tomentose and measure up to 29 cm (11 in) long. Its dark brown acorns are obovoid and measure up to 6 cm (2 in) long.

== Distribution and habitat ==
Lithocarpus keningauensis is endemic to Borneo where it is known only from Sabah. Its habitat is forests up to 300 m (1,000 ft) elevation.
