= Lithocarpus caudatifolius =

Conservation status
- Least Concern (IUCN 3.1)

Scientific classification
- Kingdom: Plantae
- Clade: Tracheophytes
- Clade: Angiosperms
- Clade: Eudicots
- Clade: Rosids
- Order: Fagales
- Family: Fagaceae
- Genus: Lithocarpus
- Species: L. caudatifolius

Binomial name
- Lithocarpus caudatifolius (Merr.) Rehder

Synonyms
- Lithocarpus minahassae (Koord.) Rehder; Quercus caudatifolia Merr.; Quercus minahassae Koord.; Synaedrys caudatifolia (Merr.) Koidz.

Species of tree

Lithocarpus caudatifolius is a tree in the beech family Fagaceae. The specific epithet caudatifolius means 'leaf with caudate apex'.

== Description ==
Lithocarpus caudatifolius grows as a tree up to 30 metres (100 ft) tall with a trunk diameter of up to 60 cm (24 in). The greyish brown bark is smooth, scaly or fissured. The coriaceous leaves measure up to 13 cm (5 in) long. Its brown acorns are ovoid to conical and measure up to 2.5 cm (1.0 in) long.

== Distribution and habitat ==
Lithocarpus caudatifolius is native to Borneo and the Philippines. Its habitat is dipterocarp to lower montane forests to 1,400 m (5,000 ft) elevation.
