= Lithocarpus burkillii =

Conservation status
- Vulnerable (IUCN 2.3)

Scientific classification
- Kingdom: Plantae
- Clade: Tracheophytes
- Clade: Angiosperms
- Clade: Eudicots
- Clade: Rosids
- Order: Fagales
- Family: Fagaceae
- Genus: Lithocarpus
- Species: L. burkillii

Binomial name
- Lithocarpus burkillii A. Camus

Species of tree

Lithocarpus burkillii is a species of plant in the family Fagaceae. It is a tree endemic to Peninsular Malaysia. It is threatened by habitat loss. It has been named after Isaac Henry Burkill.
