= Lithocarpus curtisii =

Conservation status
- Vulnerable (IUCN 2.3)

Scientific classification
- Kingdom: Plantae
- Clade: Tracheophytes
- Clade: Angiosperms
- Clade: Eudicots
- Clade: Rosids
- Order: Fagales
- Family: Fagaceae
- Genus: Lithocarpus
- Species: L. curtisii

Binomial name
- Lithocarpus curtisii (King ex Hook.f.) A.Camus

Synonyms
- Pasania curtisii (King ex Hook.f.) Gamble; Quercus curtisii King ex Hook.f.; Synaedrys curtisii (King ex Hook.f.) Koidz.

Species of tree

Lithocarpus curtisii is a species of flowering plant in the family Fagaceae. It is a tree found in Peninsular Thailand and Peninsular Malaysia. It is threatened by habitat loss.
