= Lithocarpus melataiensis =

Conservation status
- Critically Endangered (IUCN 3.1)

Scientific classification
- Kingdom: Plantae
- Clade: Embryophytes
- Clade: Tracheophytes
- Clade: Spermatophytes
- Clade: Angiosperms
- Clade: Eudicots
- Clade: Rosids
- Order: Fagales
- Family: Fagaceae
- Genus: Lithocarpus
- Species: L. melataiensis

Binomial name
- Lithocarpus melataiensis S.Julia & Soepadmo

Species of tree

Lithocarpus melataiensis is a tree in the beech family Fagaceae. It is named for, and native to, Bukit Melatai mountain in Sarawak, Borneo.

== Description ==
Lithocarpus melataiensis grows as a tree up to 30 metres (100 ft) tall with a trunk diameter of up to 70 cm (30 in). The coriaceous leaves measure up to 13.5 cm (5 in) long. The flowers are solitary along the rachis. Its brown acorns are conical and measure up to 2 cm (0.8 in) long.

== Distribution and habitat ==
Lithocarpus melataiensis is endemic to Borneo, where it is known only from Sarawak. Its habitat is mixed dipterocarp forest above 900 m (3,000 ft) elevation.

== Conservation ==
Lithocarpus melataiensis has been assessed as critically endangered on the IUCN Red List. The species known only from a single location at Bukit Melatai, where it is considered threatened by logging for its timber.
