= Madhuca engkikiana =

Conservation status
- Endangered (IUCN 3.1)

Scientific classification
- Kingdom: Plantae
- Clade: Embryophytes
- Clade: Tracheophytes
- Clade: Angiosperms
- Clade: Eudicots
- Clade: Asterids
- Order: Ericales
- Family: Sapotaceae
- Genus: Madhuca
- Species: M. engkikiana

Binomial name
- Madhuca engkikiana Yii & P.Chai

Species of tree

Madhuca engkikiana is a tree in the family Sapotaceae, native to Borneo. It is named for the Indonesian botanist Engkik Soepadmo.

== Description ==
Madhuca engkikiana grows up to 25 metres (80 ft) tall, with a trunk diameter of up to 42 cm (17 in). The bark is reddish grey. The leathery leaves are obovate to elliptic and measure up to 13 cm (5 in) long. The inflorescences are axillary. The ellipsoid fruits are brownish.

== Distribution and habitat ==
Madhuca engkikiana is endemic to Borneo, where is it confined to Sabah. Its habitat is dipterocarp forests to elevations of 1,910 m (6,270 ft).

== Conservation ==
Madhuca engkikiana has been assessed as endangered on the IUCN Red List. It is threatened by logging and by conversion of land for palm oil plantations. Being in Kinabalu Park affords the species a level of protection.
