= Lithocarpus hendersonianus =

Conservation status
- Vulnerable (IUCN 2.3)

Scientific classification
- Kingdom: Plantae
- Clade: Tracheophytes
- Clade: Angiosperms
- Clade: Eudicots
- Clade: Rosids
- Order: Fagales
- Family: Fagaceae
- Genus: Lithocarpus
- Species: L. hendersonianus

Binomial name
- Lithocarpus hendersonianus A.Camus

Species of tree

Lithocarpus hendersonianus is a tree species in the beech family Fagaceae. Trees in the genus Lithocarpus are commonly known as stone oaks and differ from Quercus primarily because they produce insect-pollinated flowers. This tree species is endemic to Peninsular Malaysia. It is categorized as Vulnerable by the IUCN Red List of Threatened Species, primarily due to habitat loss.

== Description ==
This species produces fruits with an "enclosed receptacle", where the seed becomes embedded in the basal tissue of the fruit as it develops. This basal material becomes woody, granular and hard and replaces the outer wall of the ovary as the mechanically protective tissue for the seed.

== Taxonomy ==
Aimee Camus placed this species in the subgenus Liebmannia, a small group only containing two other species. It differs from the species in the subgenera Eulithocarpus and Synaedrys because of the shape and morphology of the enclosed seed and the thickness and development of the basal material enclosing the seed.
