= Lithocarpus amygdalifolius =

Conservation status
- Least Concern (IUCN 3.1)

Scientific classification
- Kingdom: Plantae
- Clade: Tracheophytes
- Clade: Angiosperms
- Clade: Eudicots
- Clade: Rosids
- Order: Fagales
- Family: Fagaceae
- Genus: Lithocarpus
- Species: L. amygdalifolius

Binomial name
- Lithocarpus amygdalifolius (Skan) Hayata (1917)

Synonyms
- Pasania amygdalifolia (Skan) Schottky (1912); Quercus amygdalifolia Skan (1899); Synaedrys amygdalifolia (Skan) Koidz. (1916)

Species of flowering plant

Lithocarpus amygdalifolius is a species of flowering plant in the beech family, Fagaceae. It is a tree native to southeastern China (Guangdong and Fujian), Hainan, Taiwan, and Vietnam. It grows in montane broadleaf evergreen forests from 500 to 2,300 metres elevation.
