= Lithocarpus ovalis =

Conservation status
- Near Threatened (IUCN 3.1)

Scientific classification
- Kingdom: Plantae
- Clade: Embryophytes
- Clade: Tracheophytes
- Clade: Spermatophytes
- Clade: Angiosperms
- Clade: Eudicots
- Clade: Rosids
- Order: Fagales
- Family: Fagaceae
- Genus: Lithocarpus
- Species: L. ovalis

Binomial name
- Lithocarpus ovalis (Blanco) Rehder

Synonyms
- Cyclobalanus blancoi (A.DC.) Oerst.; Cyclobalanus ovalis (Blanco) Oerst.; Quercus blancoi A.DC.; Quercus conocarpa Náves ex Fern.-Vill., nom. illeg. homonym. post.; Quercus glabra Blanco, nom. illeg. homonym. post.; Quercus ovalis Blanco; Synaedrys ovalis (Blanco) Koidz.

Species of flowering plant

Lithocarpus ovalis is a species of flowering plant in the family Fagaceae. It is a tree endemic to the Philippines. It is a small to large tree, ranging from 9 to 25 meters (30 to 82 ft) tall, which flowers from November to April and fruits from June to August. It grows in primary and secondary lowland rain forests at approximately 350 meters (1,150 ft) elevation.
