= Lithocarpus maingayi =

Conservation status
- Vulnerable (IUCN 2.3)

Scientific classification
- Kingdom: Plantae
- Clade: Tracheophytes
- Clade: Angiosperms
- Clade: Eudicots
- Clade: Rosids
- Order: Fagales
- Family: Fagaceae
- Genus: Lithocarpus
- Species: L. maingayi

Binomial name
- Lithocarpus maingayi (Benth.) Rehder

Synonyms
- Lithocarpus subnucifer A.Camus; Pasania maingayi (Benth.) Schottky; Quercus maingayi Benth.; Synaedrys maingayi (Benth.) Koidz.

Species of tree

Lithocarpus maingayi is a species of flowering plant in the family Fagaceae. It is a tree native to Peninsular Malaysia and Peninsular Thailand. It grows in hill rain forests. It is threatened by habitat loss.

The species was first described as Quercus maingayi by George Bentham in 1880. In 1919 Alfred Rehder placed the species in genus Lithocarpus as L. maingayi.
