= Lithocarpus indutus =

Conservation status
- Near Threatened (IUCN 3.1)

Scientific classification
- Kingdom: Plantae
- Clade: Tracheophytes
- Clade: Angiosperms
- Clade: Eudicots
- Clade: Rosids
- Order: Fagales
- Family: Fagaceae
- Genus: Lithocarpus
- Species: L. indutus

Binomial name
- Lithocarpus indutus (Blume) Rehder

Synonyms
- Cyclobalanus induta (Blume) Oerst.; Pasania induta (Blume) S.Moore; Quercus induta Blume; Quercus induta var. microcarpa A.DC.; Synaedrys induta (Blume) Koidz.

Species of flowering plant

Lithocarpus indutus is a species of flowering plant in the family Fagaceae. Some common names it goes by are bataruwa, pasang bodas, and pasang balung. It is a tree native to western Java and Mount Slamet in central Java, and to central Sulawesi in Indonesia. It grows in remnant submontane rain forest and in middle and upper montane rain forest up to 1,800 meters elevation. It is a near-threatened species threatened by habitat loss.

The species was first described as Quercus induta by Carl Ludwig Blume in 1823. In 1919 Alfred Rehder placed the species in genus Lithocarpus as L. indutus.
