= Lithocarpus platycarpus =

Conservation status
- Endangered (IUCN 2.3)

Scientific classification
- Kingdom: Plantae
- Clade: Tracheophytes
- Clade: Angiosperms
- Clade: Eudicots
- Clade: Rosids
- Order: Fagales
- Family: Fagaceae
- Genus: Lithocarpus
- Species: L. platycarpus

Binomial name
- Lithocarpus platycarpus (Blume) Rehder

Synonyms
- Cyclobalanus platycarpa (Blume) Oerst.; Quercus platycarpa Blume; Synaedrys platycarpa (Blume) Koidz.

Species of tree

Lithocarpus platycarpus is a species of flowering plant in the family Fagaceae. It is a tree native to western and south-central Java, Peninsular Malaysia, and Peninsular Thailand, where it grows in lowland rain forest. It is an endangered species threatened by habitat loss and illegal logging.

The species was first described as Quercus platycarpa by Carl Ludwig Blume in 1829. In 1919 Alfred Rehder placed the species in genus Lithocarpus as L. platycarpus.
