= Lithocarpus crassinervius =

Conservation status
- Near Threatened (IUCN 3.1)

Scientific classification
- Kingdom: Plantae
- Clade: Tracheophytes
- Clade: Angiosperms
- Clade: Eudicots
- Clade: Rosids
- Order: Fagales
- Family: Fagaceae
- Genus: Lithocarpus
- Species: L. crassinervius

Binomial name
- Lithocarpus crassinervius (Blume) Rehder

Synonyms
- Pasania crassinervia (Blume) Oerst.; Quercus classinervia A.DC.; Quercus crassinervia Blume (1851); Quercus pseudomolucca var. crassinervia (Blume) Miq.; Synaedrys crassinervia (Blume) Koidz.

Species of tree

Lithocarpus crassinervius is a species of flowering plant in the family Fagaceae. It is a tree endemic to western and central Java in Indonesia. It grows in primary lowland rain forest and evergreen montane rain forest. is an endangered species threatened by habitat loss.

The species was first described as Quercus crassinervia by Carl Ludwig Blume in 1851. In 1919 Alfred Rehder placed the species in genus Lithocarpus as L. crassinervius.
