= Sumihiko Hatusima =

Japanese botanist (1906–2008)

- 初島 住彦
- Born: September 1906
- Died: January 22, 2008 (aged 101)
- Scientific career
- Fields: Botany

Sumihiko Hatsushima (初島 住彦, Hatsushima Sumihiko; September 1906 – January 22, 2008) was a Japanese botanist. In scholarly works using the Latin alphabet, his name is generally romanised as "Sumihiko Hatusima" following the "Kunrei" system.

Hatsushima was born in Nagasaki Prefecture, Japan in 1906. His tertiary studies and early lectureship was at Kyushu Imperial University, where he was awarded a doctorate in 1942. He accompanied Ryōzō Kanehira on a collecting expedition in New Guinea in 1940. Hatsushima returned to Austronesia in a collecting expedition to the Philippines in 1964.

Hatsushima died in 2008.
