= Karl Otto von Seemen =

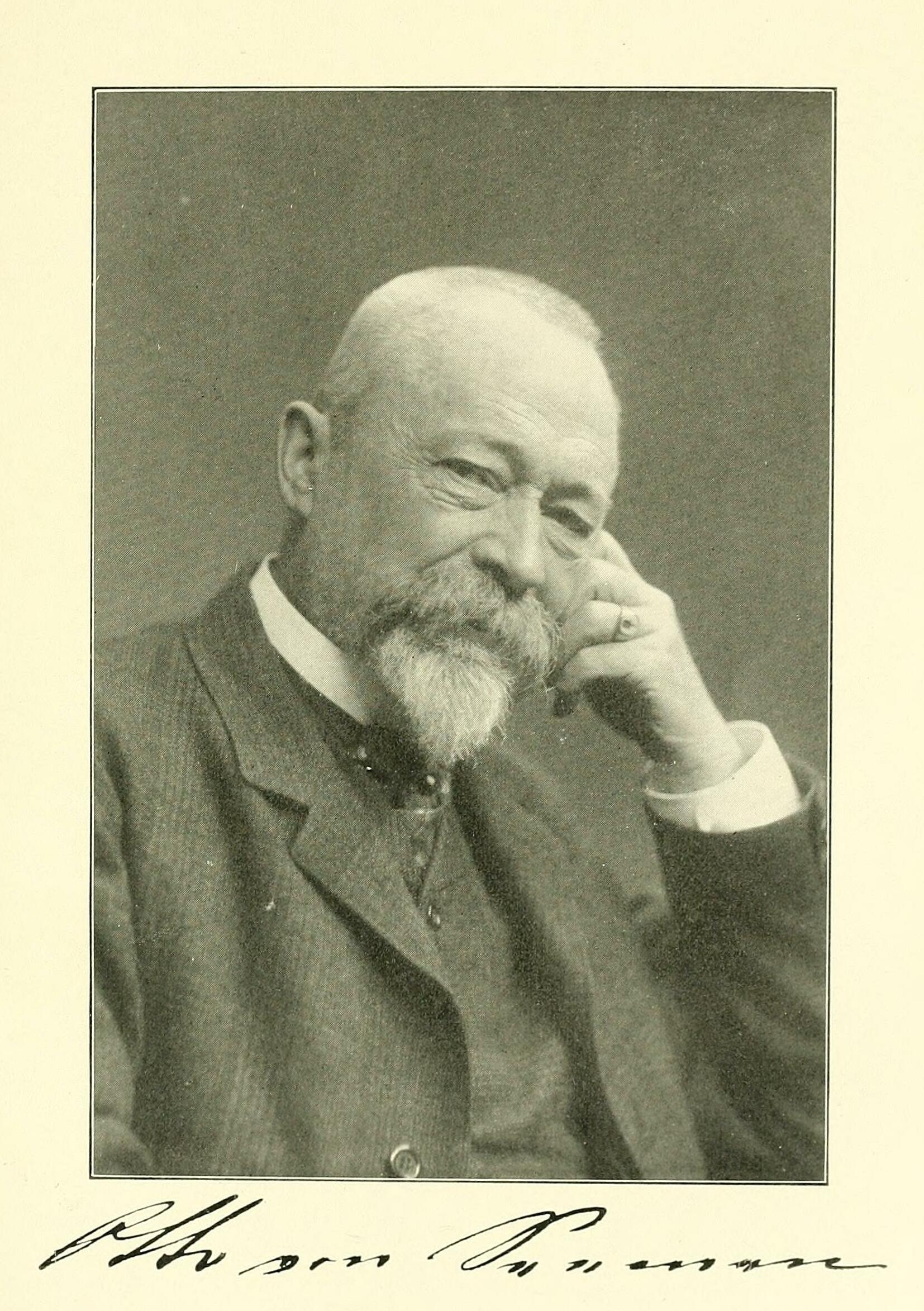
Image of Otto von Seemen

Karl Otto von Seemen (2 August 1838 - 23 June 1910) was a German botanist and horticulturalist. He is noted for his studies of plants in the south of Africa.

== Plants studied ==
According to the International Plant Names Index (IPNI) some 109 plant names were published by Seemen, including species of Castanopsis, Fagus, Pyrola, Quercus and Salix

== Selected species ==
- (Caprifoliaceae) Viburnum (sect. Oreinotinus) seemenii Graebn.
- (Potamogetonaceae) Potamogeton seemenii Asch. & Graebn.
- (Ranunculaceae) Anemonoides × seemenii (Camus) Holub
- (Salicaceae) Salix seemenii B.Fedtsch.

== Publications ==
1903. Salices Japonicæ, &c. (Leipzig, Gebrüder Borntraeger) 83 pp.
