= Pieter Willem Korthals =

Dutch botanist

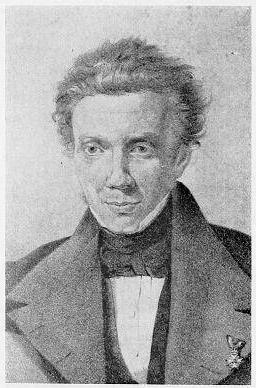
Pieter Willem Korthals

Pieter Willem Korthals (1 September 1807, Amsterdam – March 1892, Haarlem) was a Dutch botanist. Korthals was the official botanist with the Dutch East India Service from 1831 to 1836. Among his many discoveries was the medicinal plant Kratom (Mitragyna speciosa). Korthals wrote the first monograph on the tropical pitcher plants, "Over het geslacht Nepenthes", published in 1839.

Carl Ludwig Blume named the botanical genus Korthalsia (family Arecaceae) after Korthals, and Philippe Édouard Léon Van Tieghem introduced the genus name Korthalsella (family Santalaceae) in his honor. Bulbophyllum korthalsii was named after him.
