= Anders Sandøe Ørsted (botanist) =

Danish botanist, mycologist, zoologist and marine biologist (1816–1872)

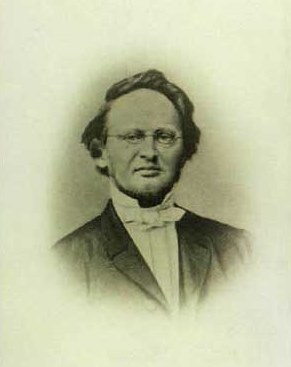
- Born: 21 June 1816; Rudkøbing, Denmark
- Died: 3 September 1872 (aged 56); Copenhagen, Denmark
- Education: University of Copenhagen
- Known for: Neotropical botany heteroecy of plant-pathogenic fungi Nematode systematics
- Relatives: Anders Sandøe Ørsted (uncle)
- Scientific career
- Fields: Botany
- Workplaces: University of Copenhagen
- Doctoral students: Eugen Warming
- Author abbrev. (botany): Oerst.

Anders Sandøe Ørsted, also written as Anders Sandoe Oersted or Anders Sandö Örsted (21 June 1816 – 3 September 1872), was a Danish botanist, mycologist, zoologist and marine biologist. He was the nephew of physicist Hans Christian Ørsted and of politician Anders Sandøe Ørsted.

== Early life and education ==
Ørsted was born on 21 June 1816 in Rudkøbing on the island of Langeland, the son of merchant Jacob Albert Ørsted (1780–1829) and wife Petronelle Catherine Ørsted, née Bang (1781–1845). From 1820, he lived with his uncle Anders Sandøe Ørsted, who treated him as his own son.

== Career ==
In his early career, Ørsted published on Danish and Arctic nematodes and on the zonation of marine algae in Øresund.

Between 1845 and 1848, he travelled extensively in Central America and the Caribbean, and published numerous papers on the flora, concentrating on the plant families Acanthaceae and Fagaceae. One of his better known publications is L'Amérique Centrale.

He was appointed professor of botany at the University of Copenhagen in 1851, a post he held until 1862. He was succeeded by Ferdinand Didrichsen.

Ørsted's studies of what has since been known as juniper-pear rust showed that this fungus annually switches between two hosts; Juniperus sabina is the primary (telial) host, and pear, Pyrus communis, is the secondary (aecial) host. He thus was the first to discover that some plant-parasitic fungi are heteroecious. These studies were continued on other Gymnosporangium species.

The orchid genus Oerstedella Reichenbach f., and Dieffenbachia oerstedii are named after him.

He is the author of several hundred plant names still in use.
