= Gen-ichi Koidzumi =

Japanese botanist (1883–1953)

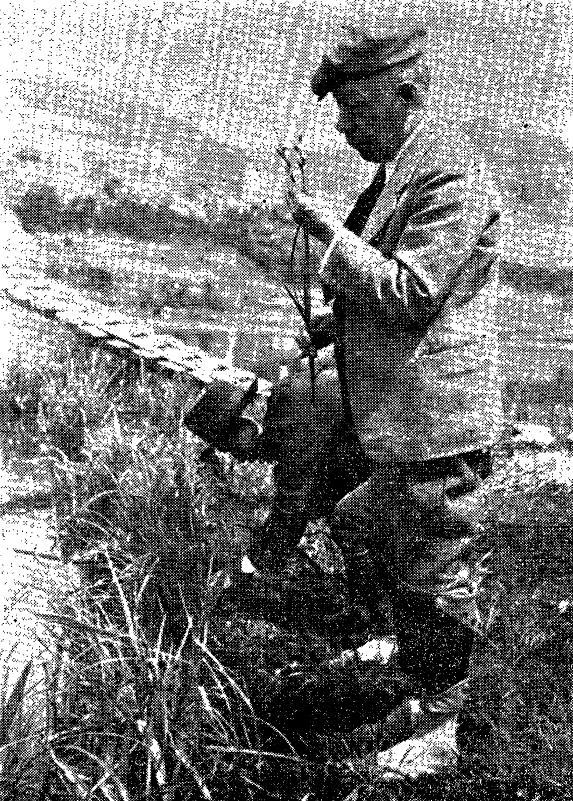
- Born: 1 November 1883
- Died: 21 December 1953 (aged 70)
- Scientific career
- Fields: Botany
- Author abbrev. (botany): Koidz.

Gen-ichi Koidzumi (小泉 源一, Koizumi Gen'ichi; 1 November 1883 – 21 December 1953) was a Japanese botanist, author of several papers and monographs on phytogeography including work on roses and Amygdaloideae (Rosaceae), maples (Aceraceae), mulberries (the genus Morus), and many other plants. His name is sometimes transliterated as Gen’ichi or Gen-Iti, or as Koizumi.

== Biography ==
Gen-ichi Koidzumi was born in Yonezawa in Yamagata Prefecture in 1883. After graduating from the Sapporo Agricultural College, he studied biology at Tokyo Imperial University from 1905, continuing his studies there under Matsumura Jinzō, and receiving his doctorate in 1916. In 1919, he was appointed assistant professor at Kyoto Imperial University, where he remained (other than for a tour of the herbaria of Europe and the United States from 1925 to 1927) until his retirement in 1943; he was promoted to full professor in 1936. In 1932, he founded the Societas Phytogeographica and the journal Acta Phytotaxonomica et Geobotanica. Koidzumi died in his hometown of Yonezawa in 1953. According to the International Plant Names Index, in total he published over 1,600 new botanical names.

== Published works ==
- 1956. Plants of Jaluit Island (Pacific surveys report / U.S. Army, Corps of Engineers, Far East)
- 1952. The Big Button Palm which produces the ivory nut ([Reports] - USGS, Pacific Geological Surveys)
- 1930. Florae Symbolae Orientali-Asiaticae sive Contributions to the Knowledge of the Flora of Eastern Asia. Kyoto, Japan., 115 pp.
- 1928. Plantae Novae Amami-Ohsimensis nec non Insularum adjacentium: 1 Phytogeographical notes on the flora of the Loochoo Archipelago. 2 Description of new species. 19 pp.
