= Aimée Antoinette Camus =

French botanist (1879-1965)

- Born: 1 May 1879; L'Isle-Adam, France
- Died: 17 April 1965 (aged 85)
- Citizenship: French
- Known for: Work with orchids and oaks
- Awards: Knight of the Legion of Honour (1936)
- Scientific career
- Fields: Botany
- Author abbrev. (botany): A.Camus

Aimée Antoinette Camus (1 May 1879 – 17 April 1965) was a French botanist. She was best known for her study of orchids and oaks. Camus also has the legacy of authoring the second highest number of land plant species among female scientists, in total naming 677 species.

== Biography ==
Camus was the daughter of Edmond Gustave Camus, also a botanist, and was born in L'Isle-Adam, about 50 kilometres north of Paris. Under her father's influence, she specialized in the study of orchids and the anatomy of the plant and worked for some time with other professionals such as Paul Bergon (1863-1912) and Paul Henri Lecomte (1856-1934).

She was especially close to her sister, the painter Blanche-Augustine Camus (1881-1968).

=== Collaboration with the Paris Natural History Museum ===
From 1922, Camus voluntarily collaborated for more than 30 years as a free worker for the Paris Natural History Museum and her numerous publications are part of the Museum's collections. According to the comments made on her Legion of Honour file, she contributed greatly to the influence and reputation of the museum in the world.

She produced a major treatment of the Quercus oaks and Lithocarpus stone oaks, providing the first comprehensive systematic treatment of the latter genus. She also gave the name of Neohouzeaua to a genus of seven tropical bamboo, in honour of the lifelong work that Jean Houzeau de Lehaie had devoted to the understanding of the botany and propagation of bamboo in Europe and Africa.

Aimée Antoinette Camus died on 17 April 1965 at her home in the 15th arrondissement of Paris at the age of 85.

=== Honors and awards ===
- Camus was twice laureate of the Institute (academy of sciences) in 1906 and in 1930.
- Camus was made a Knight of the Legion of Honor on 3 May 1936 in Paris.

== Bibliography ==
- 1894: Plantes récoltées à Morcles (canton de Vaud) et sur la montagne de Fully (Valais). (with Edmond Gustave Camus) Paris: May et Motteroz,
- 1904: Classification de saules d'Europe et monographie des saules de France. (with Edmond Gustave Camus) Paris: J. Mersch, 1904-5, republished USA: Wentworth Press, 2018.
- 1904: Atlas de la monographie des saules de France. Paris: J. Mersch.
- 1908: Monographie des orchidées de l'Europe de l'Afrique septentrionale, de l'Asie Mineure et des provinces russes transcaspiennes. Paris: J. Lechevalier.
- 1912: Florule de Saint-Tropez et de ses environs immédiats. Paris: Paul Lechevalier.
- 1913: Espèces et variétés de riz de l'Indochine. Paris: Laboratoire d'Agronomie coloniale.
- 1914: Les Cyprès (Genre Cupressus) : monographie systématique, anatomie, culture, principaux usages. Paris: Paul Lechevalier, 1914 republished by Forgotten Books, 2018 ISBN 978-0259839569
- 1918: Note sur les orchidées de la Vallée de Thorenc. Riviera scientifique (1918),
- 1919: Note sur quelques orchidées de Vence et de ses environs. Riviera scientifique (1919),
- 1921: Les Fleurs des marais, des tourbières, des cours d'eau, des lacs et des étangs (plantes palustres et aquatiques). Paris: Paul Lechevalier.
- 1921-1929: Iconographie des Orchidées d'Europe et du Bassin Méditerranéen. (with Edmond Gustave Camus & H. Lecomte) Paris: Paul Lechevalier.
- 1922: Flore générale de l'Indo-Chine. Vol. 7. Première partie, Eriocaulonacées à Graminées.
- 1923: Les arbres, arbustes et arbrisseaux d'ornement. Paris: Paul Lechevalier.
- 1924: Quelques anomalies florales chez les orchidées. Bulletin de la Société botanique de France (1924)
- 1926: Un cyprès nouveau du Tassili (Cupressus dupreziana). Bulletin du Musée d'Histoire Naturelle (1926)
- 1929: Les châtaigniers: monographie des genres Castanea et Castanopsis. Paris: Paul Lechevalier.
- 1935: Les chênes dans la production forestière indochinoise. Revue de botanique appliquee et d'agriculture tropicale, Col. 15 (1935): 20–25.
- 1938: Quercus ilex L. et espèces asiatiques avec lesquelles il a été confondu. C.R. Congres Soc. Sav. Nice, 1938.
- 1934-1954: Les Chênes: monographie du genre Quercus (et Lithocarpus) (1992), collection of 72 essays. Paris: Paul Lechevalier.
  1934: Atlas. Vol I. Sous-genre Cyclobalanopsis. Sous-genre Euquercus (Section Cerris and Mesobalanus). Encyclopédie économique de sylviculture VI. 108 paintings
  1936-1938: Vol. I Genre Quercus. Sous-genre Cyclobalanopsis et sous-genre Euquercus (Section Cerris et Mesobalanus).
  1935-1936: Atlas. Vol. II. Sous-genre Euquercus (Section Lepidobalanus). Encyclopédie économique de sylviculture VII. 186 paintings
  1938-1939: Vol II. Genre Quercus. Sous-genre Euquercus (sections Lepidobalanus et Macrobalanus).
  1948: Atlas. Vol III. Sous-genre Euquercus (sections Protobalanus et Erythrobalanus) et genre Lithocarpus. Encyclopédie économique de sylviculture VIII. 325 paintings
  1952-1954: Vol III (Part 1), Vol III (Part 2). Genre Quercus. Sous-genre Euquercus (sections Protobalanus et Erythrobalanus).
