= Engkik Soepadmo =

Indonesian born botanist

Engkik Soepadmo (3 March 1937 – 6 March 2021) was an Indonesian botanist and ecologist who worked in Malaysia. His research focused on the tropical rainforest in Southeast Asia, particularly in Malaysia and Indonesia. He authored numerous publications on the flora of Malesia, and contributed to forest conservation and the establishment of protected areas in Malaysia.

== Early life and education ==
Soepadmo was born and raised in Kartosuro, Surakarta, Central Java, Indonesia. His early education was at the Secondary School in Solo. He graduated from high school in 1955, and attended the College of Biology in Bogor, graduating in 1959 with a bachelor's degree in Taxonomic Botany. He served for a time as a junior botanist at the Herbarium Bogoriense before attending the University of Cambridge, where he obtained a PhD in July 1966. For the following two years he had a research fellowship from the University of Leiden in the Netherlands.

== Academic and research career ==
Dr Soepadmo was appointed as a lecturer in Tropical Botany at the University of Malaya in 1968. He became an associate professor at the Department of Botany in 1975, and soon after was appointed as the Professor of Ecology at the university. He was also associated with the Forest Research Institute Malaysia (FRIM).

== Publications ==
He authored monographs for the Flora Malesiana on the Fagaceae (oak and chestnut family, Ser. 1, volume 7, 2 (1972)) and Ulmaceae (elm family, volume 8, 2 (1977)). He edited and authored the seven volumes of the Tree Flora of Sabah and Sarawak (1995–2011). He edited and helped complile The Encyclopedia of Malaysia: Plants, published in 1998. He also authored over 100 published papers.

Dr. Soepadmo named over 70 species of plants, including species of Lithocarpus, Quercus, Castanopsis, and Celtis.

Dr. Soepadmo conducted research, authored papers, and led research expeditions which helped establish or create conservation strategies for various protected areas in Malaysia, including Endau-Rompin National Park, Royal Belum State Park, Bukit Tawai Protection Forest Reserve, Lanjak-Entimau/Betung Kerihun Transboundary Conservation Area, and Pulong Tau National Park.

== Recognition ==
In 2012 he was given the Merdeka Award. The Malaysian Nature Society (MNS) awarded Dr Soepadmo Honorary Life Membership in recognition of his "significant and meaningful contribution to the Malaysian Nature Society and their study of Malaysia’s natural heritage". In 2015 the Linnean Society of London awarded Dr. Soepadmo a Linnean Medal in recognition of his service to science.

Plants named in recognition of Dr. Soepadmo include:

- Actinodaphne soepadmoi Julia (Lauraceae)
- Aglaia soepadmoi C.M.Pannell (Meliaceae)
- Cinnamomum soepadmoi Kostermans (Lauraceae)
- Ficus soepadmoi Kochummen (Moraceae)
- Syzygium soepadmoi P.S.Ashton (Myrtaceae)
- Vatica soepadmoi P.S.Ashton (Dipterocarpaceae)
- Madhuca engkikiana Yii & P.Chai (Sapotaceae)
- †Soepadmoa Crepet, Gandolfo, & Grimaldi, a ~90–94 million year old extinct fossil genus of Fagaceae.
