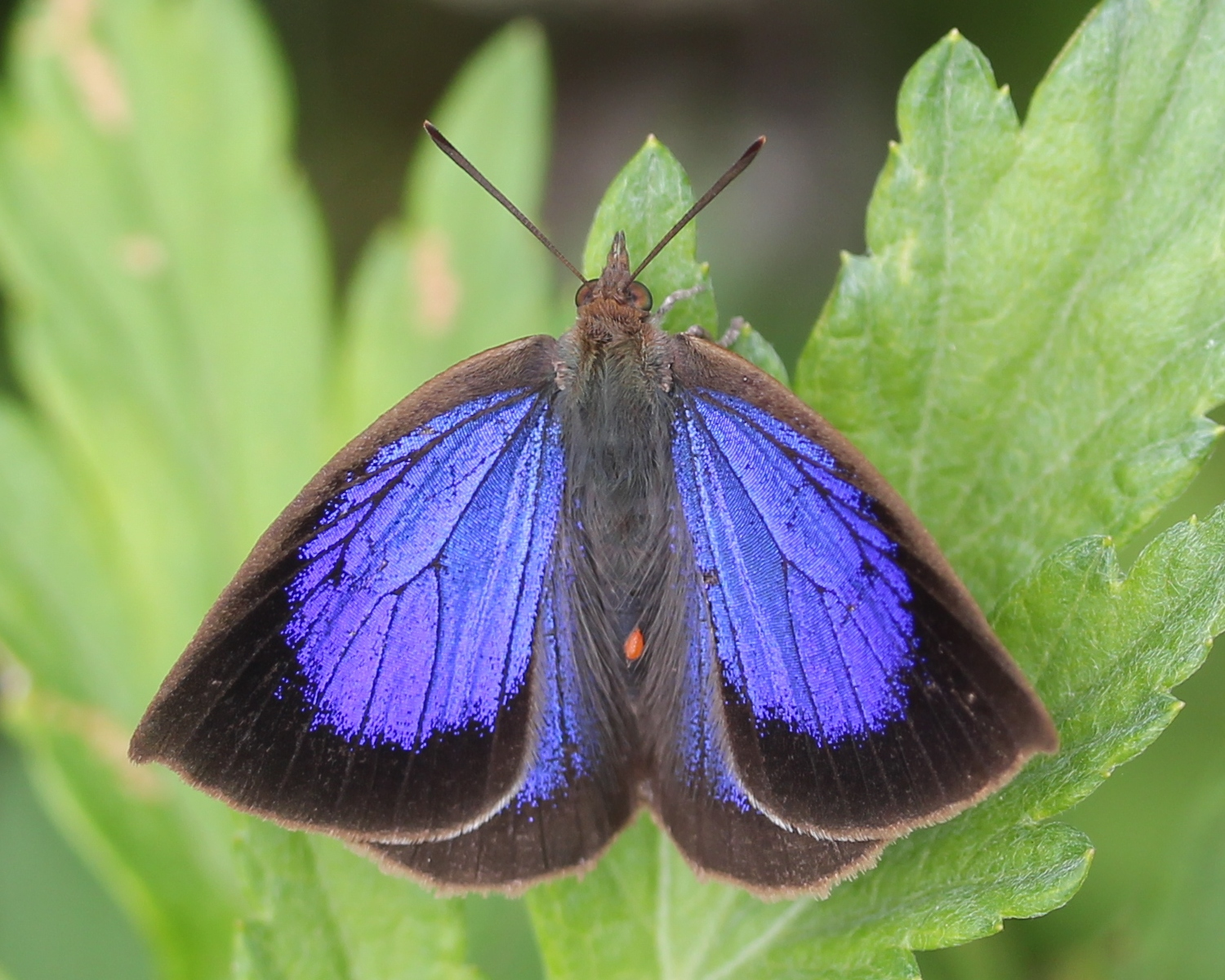
- male A. j. japonica, Japan

Scientific classification
- Kingdom: Animalia
- Phylum: Arthropoda
- Clade: Pancrustacea
- Class: Insecta
- Order: Lepidoptera
- Family: Lycaenidae
- Genus: Arhopala
- Species: A. japonica

Binomial name
- Arhopala japonica (Murray, 1875)

Synonyms
- Amblypodia japonica; Narathura japonica

= Arhopala japonica =

Japanese oakblue

Species of butterfly

Arhopala japonica, the Japanese oakblue, is a species of butterfly in the family Lycaenidae. It is found in Indochina, Japan, the Ryukyu Islands, the Korean Peninsula and Taiwan.

== Description ==
Arhopala japonica is part of the Arhopala rama species group. Seitz summarises this A. japonica is almost exactly like rama, but without its tail-appendage; also dodonea with a pale earth-brown under surface and light, dark-edged macular bands, japonica continues rama in Southern Japan, dodonea in the palearctic part of Kashmir; both reach to some districts of India; the former in Formosa where beside the typical japonica, which according to Matsumura is not at all rare there, another ab. horishana Mats, occurs which is described (from a single female) to be above more broadly margined, beneath distinctly darker, with very narrow transverse bands, and much larger basal spots on the hindwing than in japonica. Of dodonea. which de Niceville takes to be a dimorphous form of rama with which it flies in some valleys of Kashmir, also an aberration is described: — ab. comica Nic.[ now species Arhopala comica] - from Bhamo in Upper Burma, above like dodonea, beneath with a denser, more intense colouring and somewhat removed macular markings. — The imagines of this group of forms are in some parts common; they are the only Amblypodia I noticed flying among cornfields. They are presumably of all the species of this genus those that can stand the most cold. I captured dozens in Nagasaki on fresh autumn mornings; they proceed the farthest to the north as well as in a vertical direction up to hibernal altitudes, and Doherty observed rama flying yet in great numbers in winter near Ramgarh, when snow covered the ground. The wingspan is 24–30 mm.

The larvae feed on Pasania edulis, Pasania glabra, Quercus acuta, Quercus glauca, Quercus serrata, Quercus stenophylla, Cyclobalanopsis glauca, Cyclobalanopsis gilva and Cyclobalanopsis acuta.

== Subspecies ==
- Arhopala japonica japonica
- Arhopala japonica kotoshona (Taiwan)
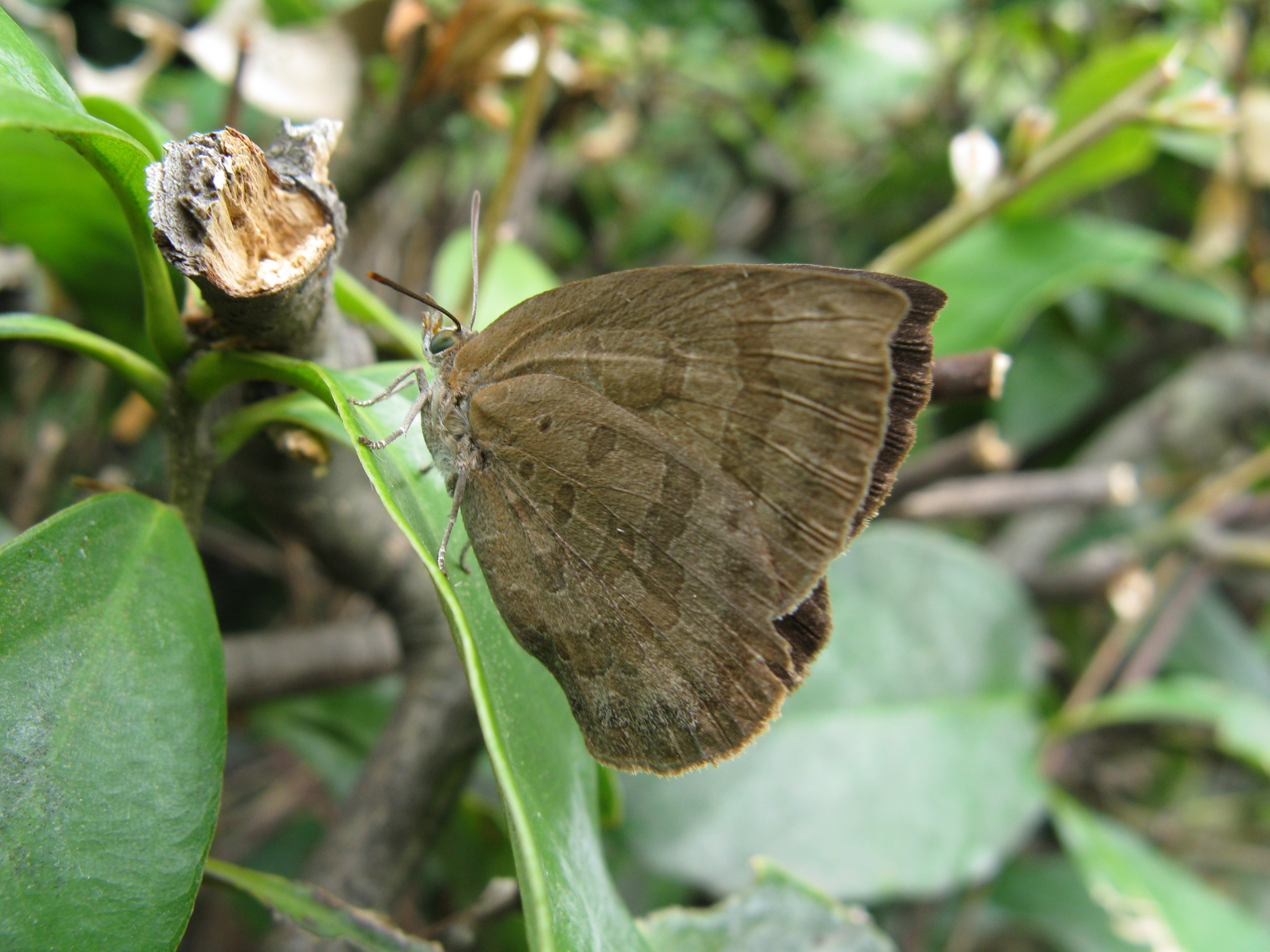
A. j. Japonica, Japan

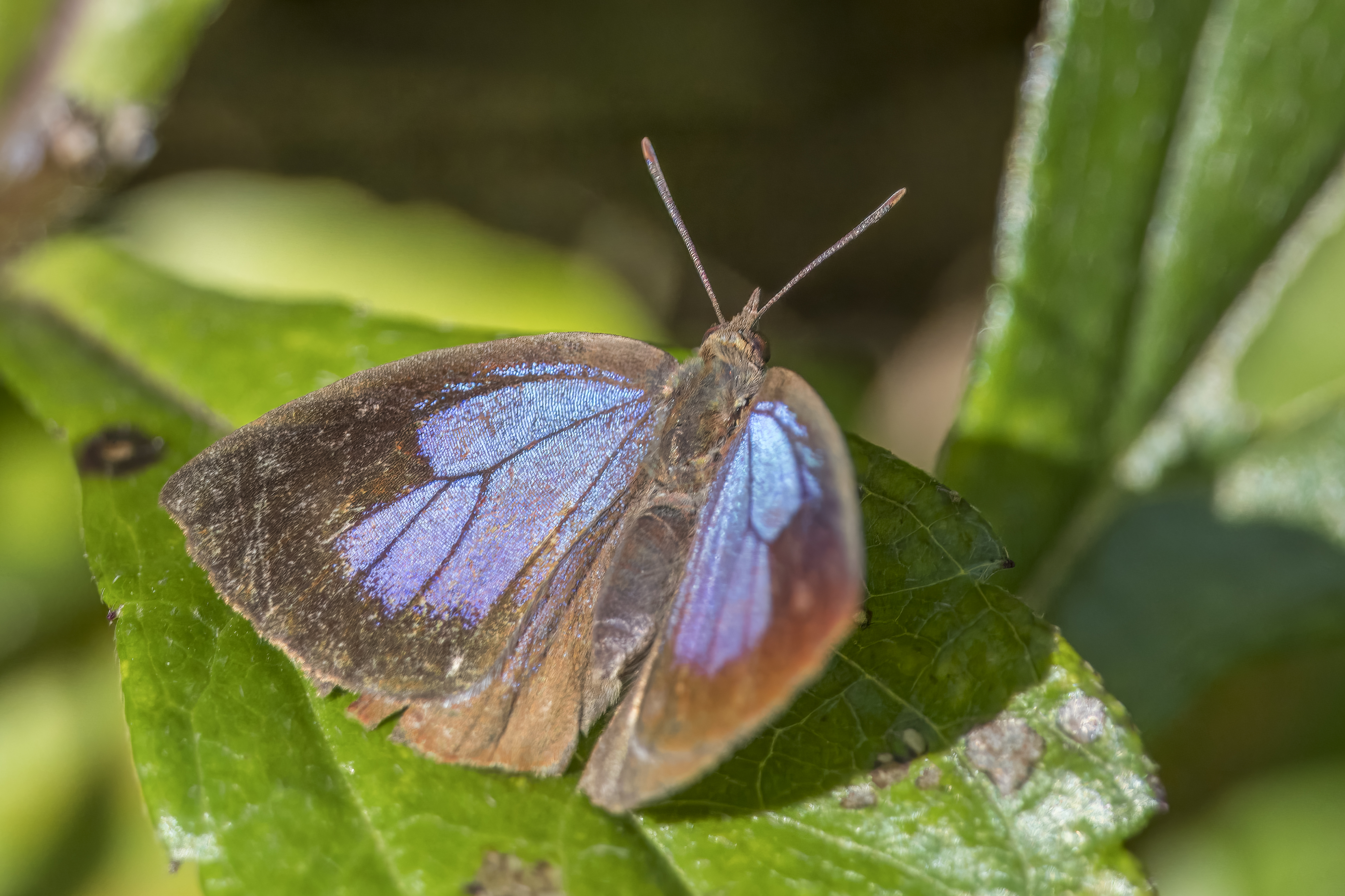
A. j. kotoshona, Taiwan

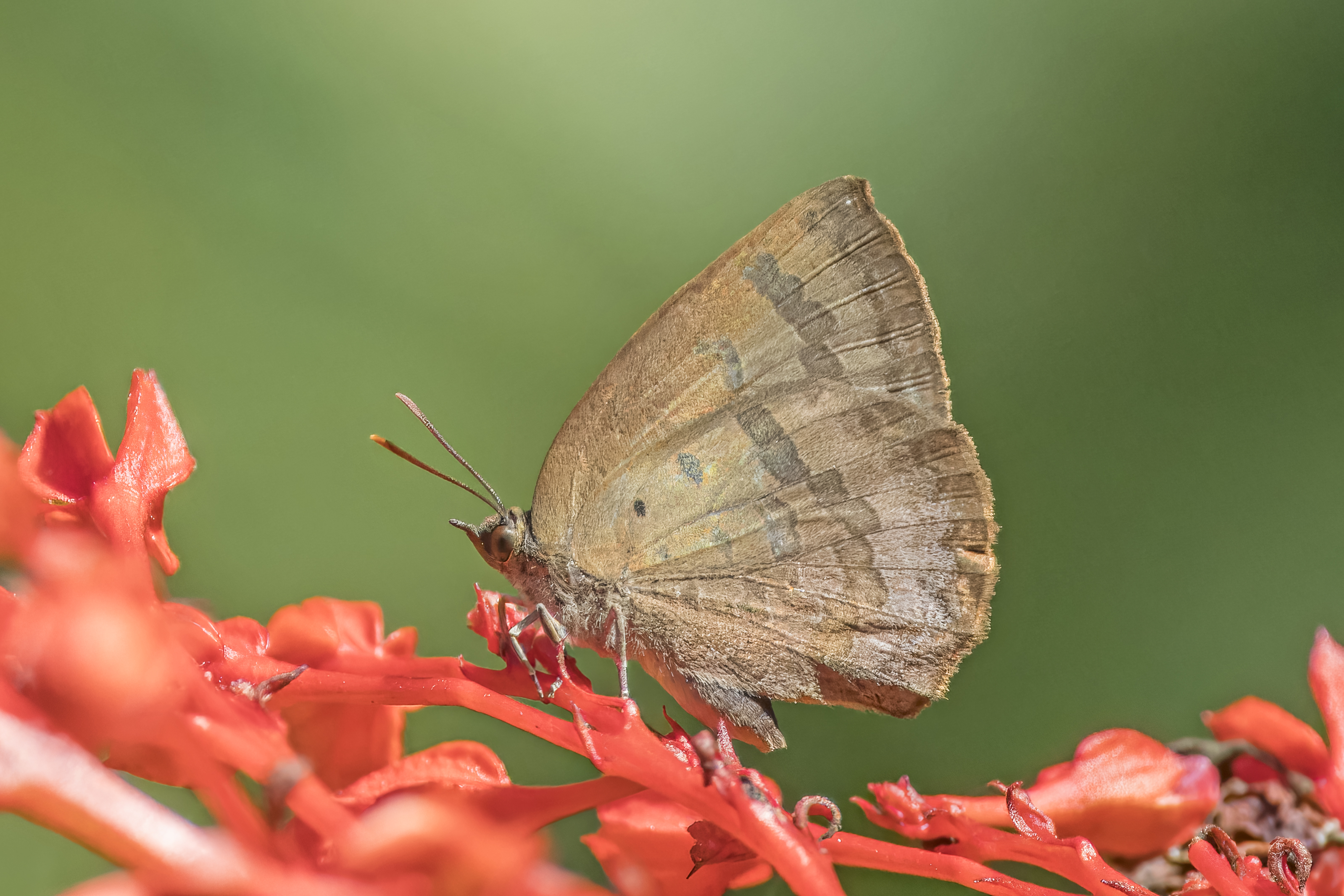
A. j. kotoshona, Taiwan

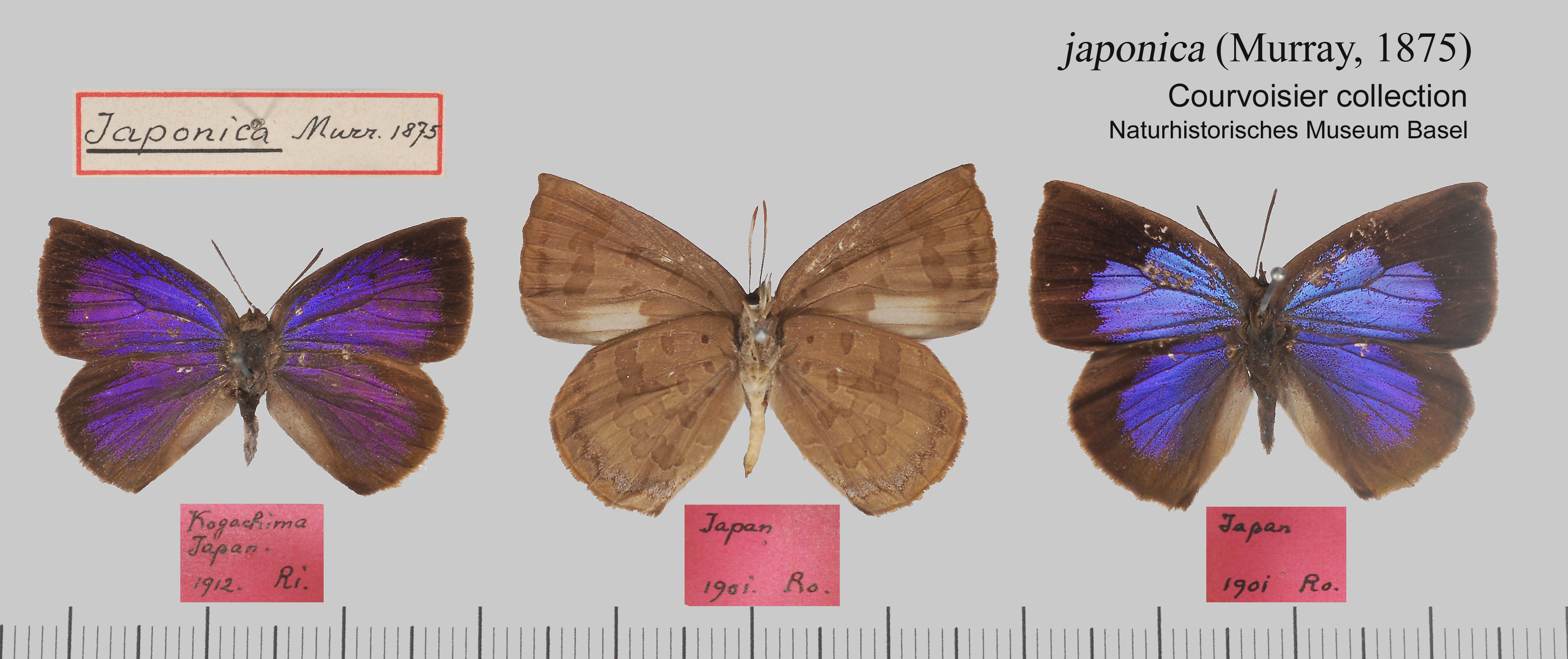
male and female, Courvoisier Collection, Basel
