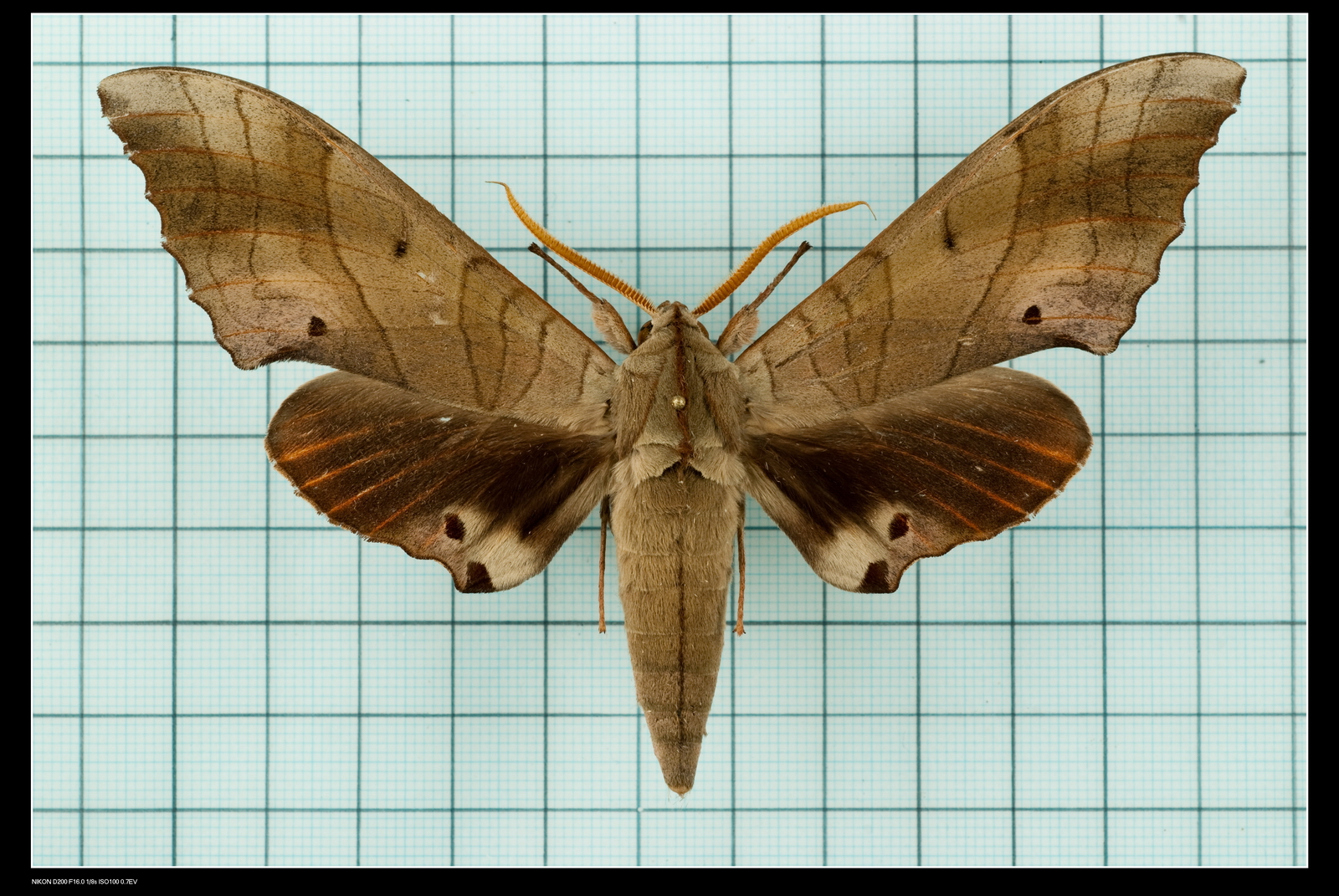

Scientific classification
- Kingdom: Animalia
- Phylum: Arthropoda
- Class: Insecta
- Order: Lepidoptera
- Family: Sphingidae
- Genus: Marumba
- Species: M. sperchius

Binomial name
- Marumba sperchius (Menetries, 1857)

Synonyms
- Smerinthus sperchius Ménétriés, 1857; Triptogon albicans Butler, 1875; Triptogon gigas Butler, 1875; Triptogon piceipennis Butler, 1877; Marumba scotti Rothschild, 1920; Smerinthus michaelis Oberthür, 1886; Marumba sperchius castanea O. Bang-Haas, 1938; Marumba sperchius coreanus O. Bang-Haas, 1938; Marumba sperchius handelii Mell, 1922; Marumba sperchius horiana Clark, 1937; Marumba sperchius koreaesperchius Bryk, 1946; Marumba sperchius obsoleta O. Bang-Haas, 1938; Marumba sperchius ochraceus O. Bang-Haas, 1927; Marumba sperchius ussuriensis O. Bang-Haas, 1927

= Marumba sperchius =

Species of moth

Marumba sperchius is a species of moth of the family Sphingidae first described by Édouard Ménétries in 1857.

== Distribution ==
It is found from north-western and north-eastern India, south-western, central and eastern China to the southern Russian Far East, North Korea, South Korea and Japan. It is also present on Sumatra and Borneo.

== Description ==
The wingspan is 88–138 mm. It is similar to Marumba juvencus, but the lines of the forewing and the ground colour of the hindwing are more reddish and the lines on either side of the weak discal spot are hardly converge.

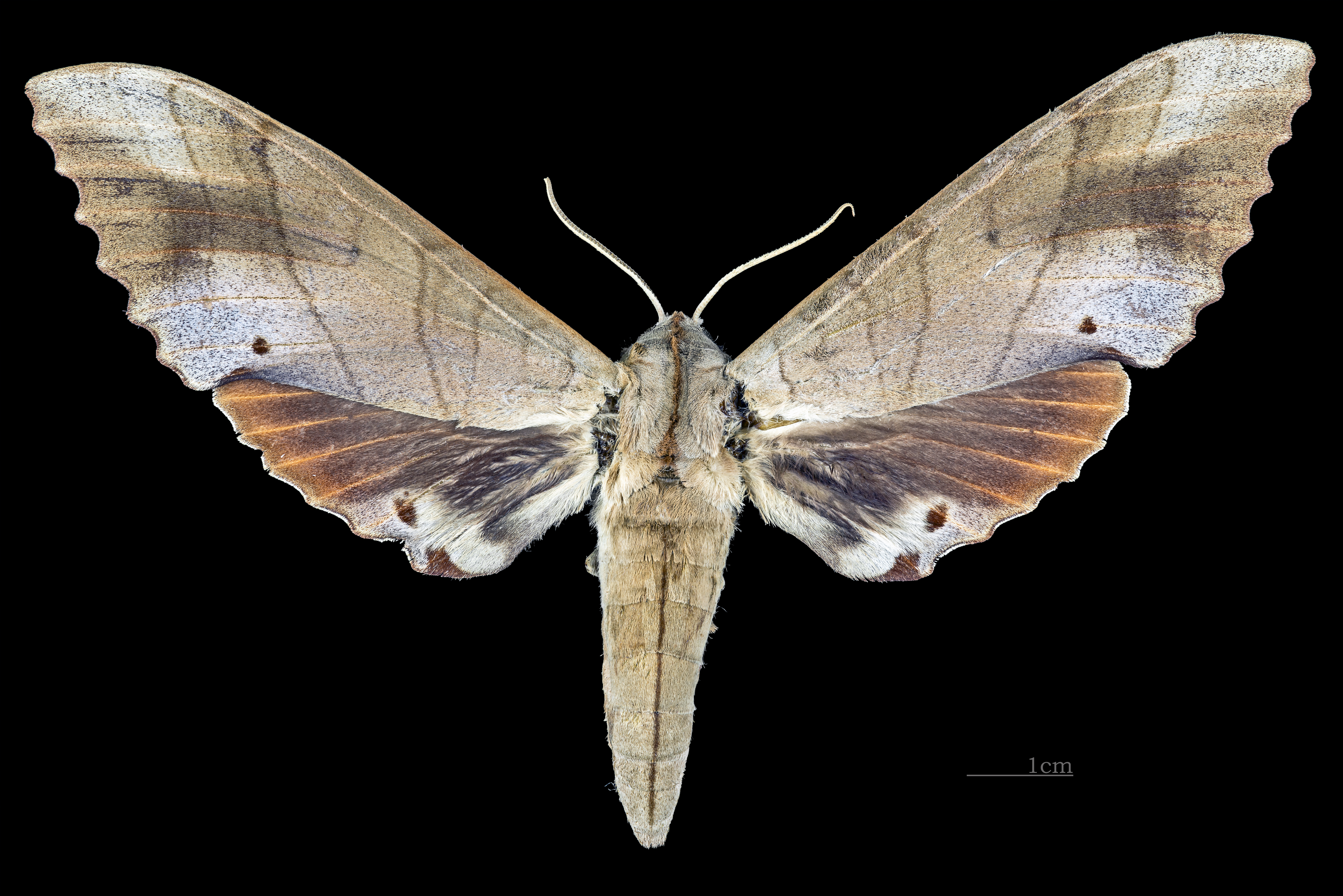
Female, dorsal view

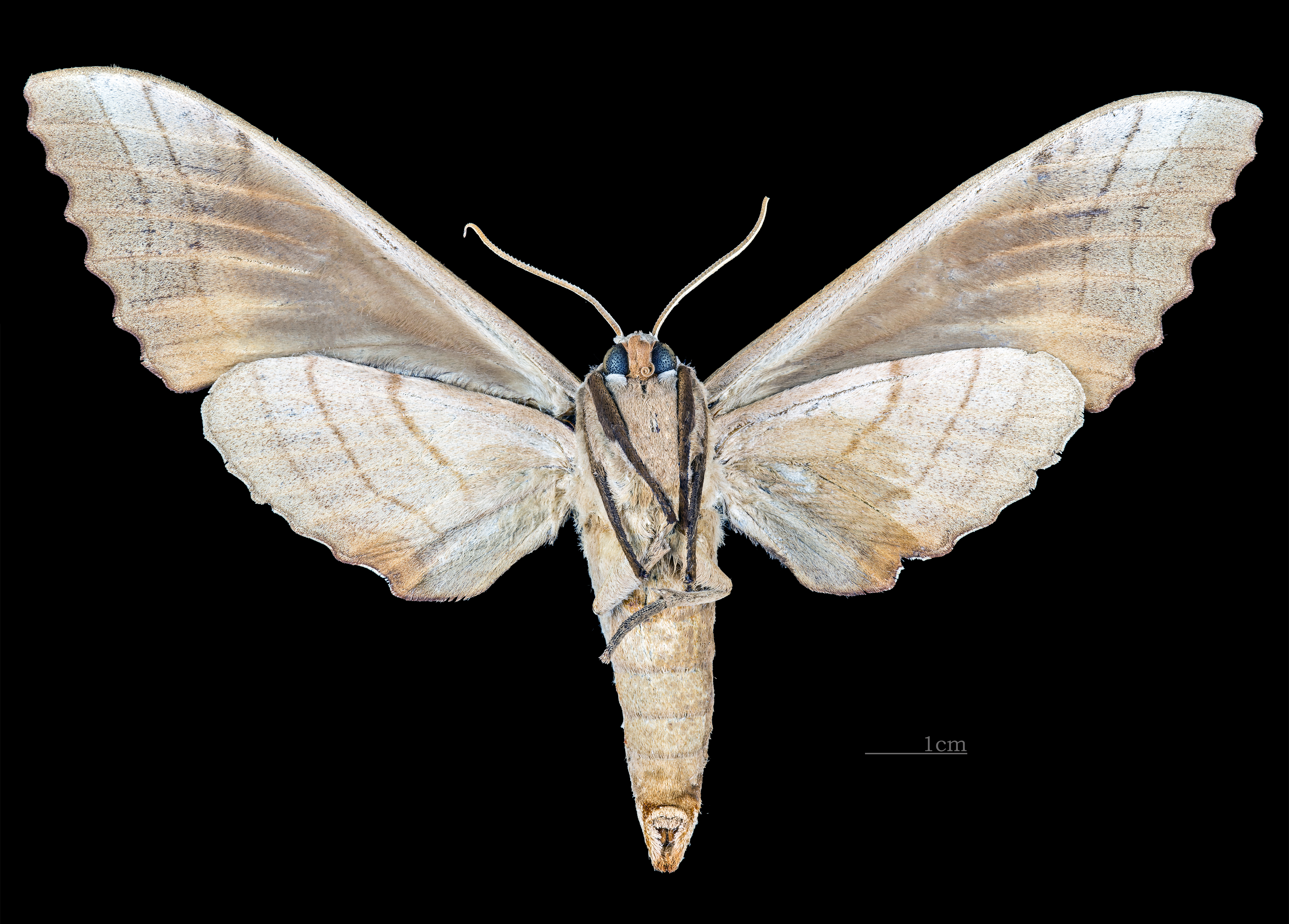
Female, ventral view

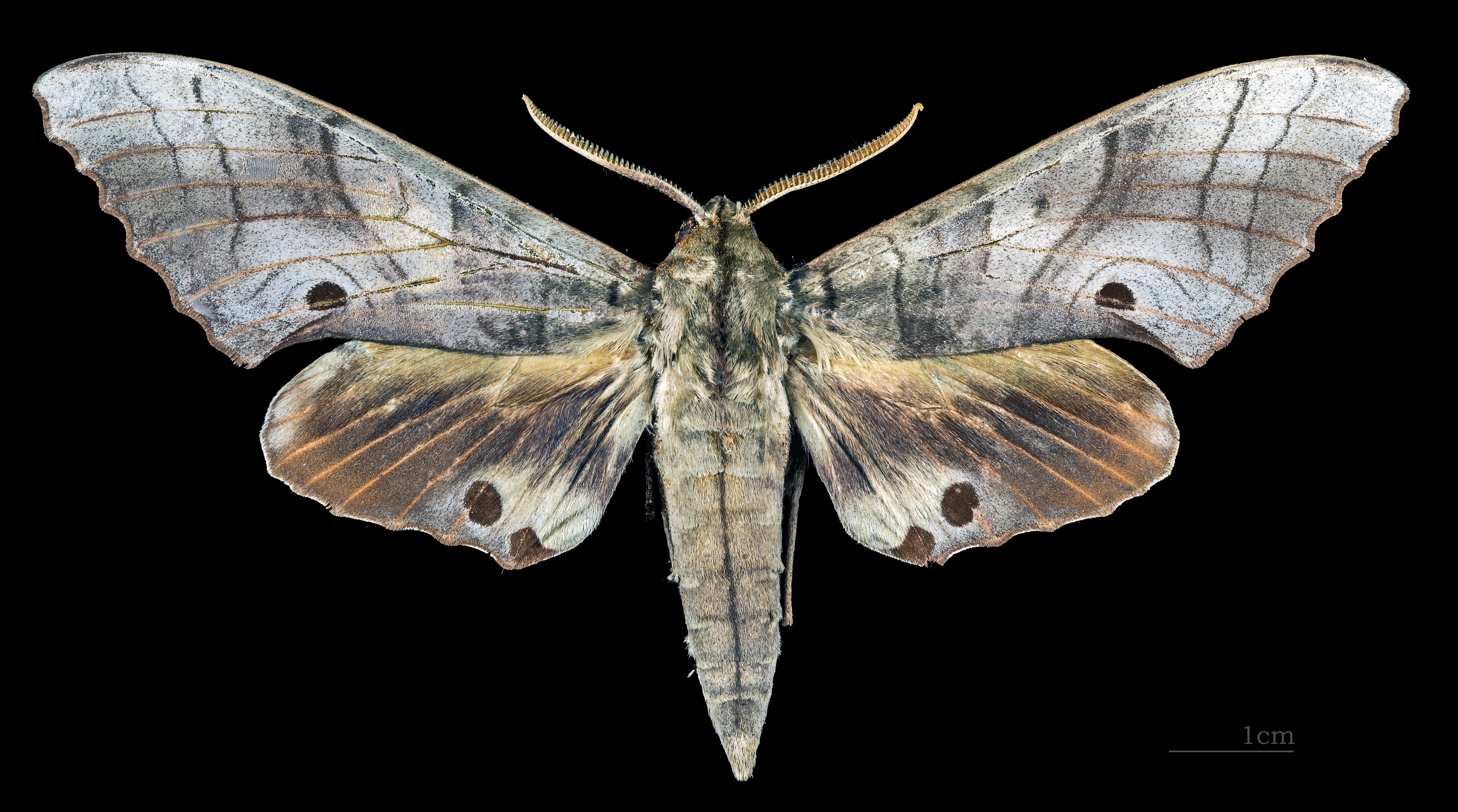
Male, dorsal view

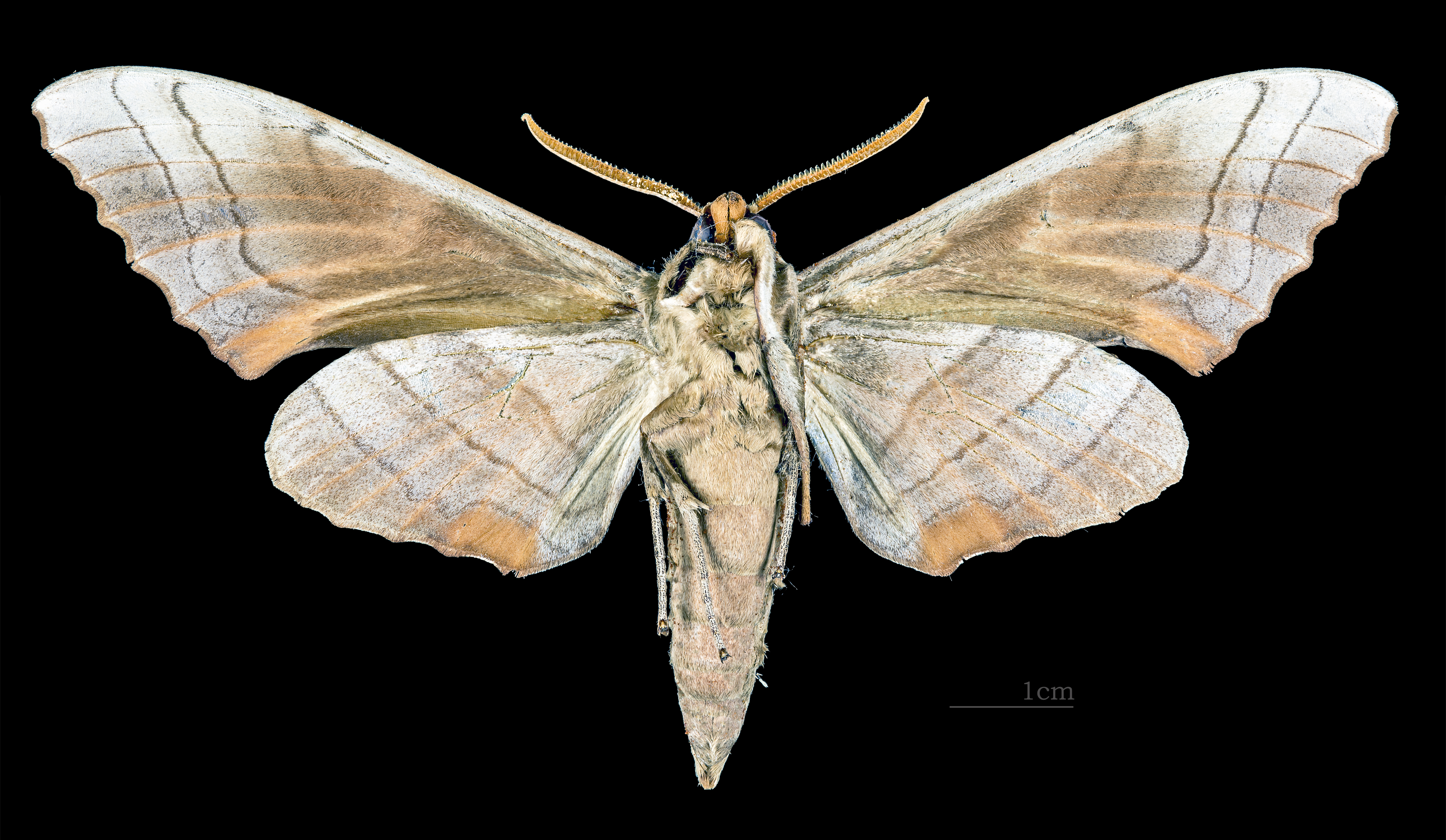
Male, ventral view

== Biology ==
There are two generations per year with adults on wing in April and again in August in northern China. In Korea, adults are on wing from late May to late August.

The larvae have been recorded feeding on Castanea (including C. crenata), Castanopsis, Quercus (including Q. glauca, Q. mongolica, Q. acutissima, Q. myrsinaefolia, Q. acuta, Q. salicina and Q. serrata), Juglans (including J. regia and J. mandschurica), Lithocarpus (including L. edulis) and Eriobotrya species. Early instars are pale yellow, while later instars turn bluish green with the tubercles brown or reddish, tipped with white. Oblique stripes are formed of mauve or yellow tubercles on a white ground. The horn is green with paler tubercles.

== Subspecies ==
- Marumba sperchius sperchius (from north-western India across north-eastern India, south-western, central and eastern China to the southern Russian Far East, North Korea, South Korea and Japan)
- Marumba sperchius sumatranus Clark, 1923 (Sumatra, Borneo)
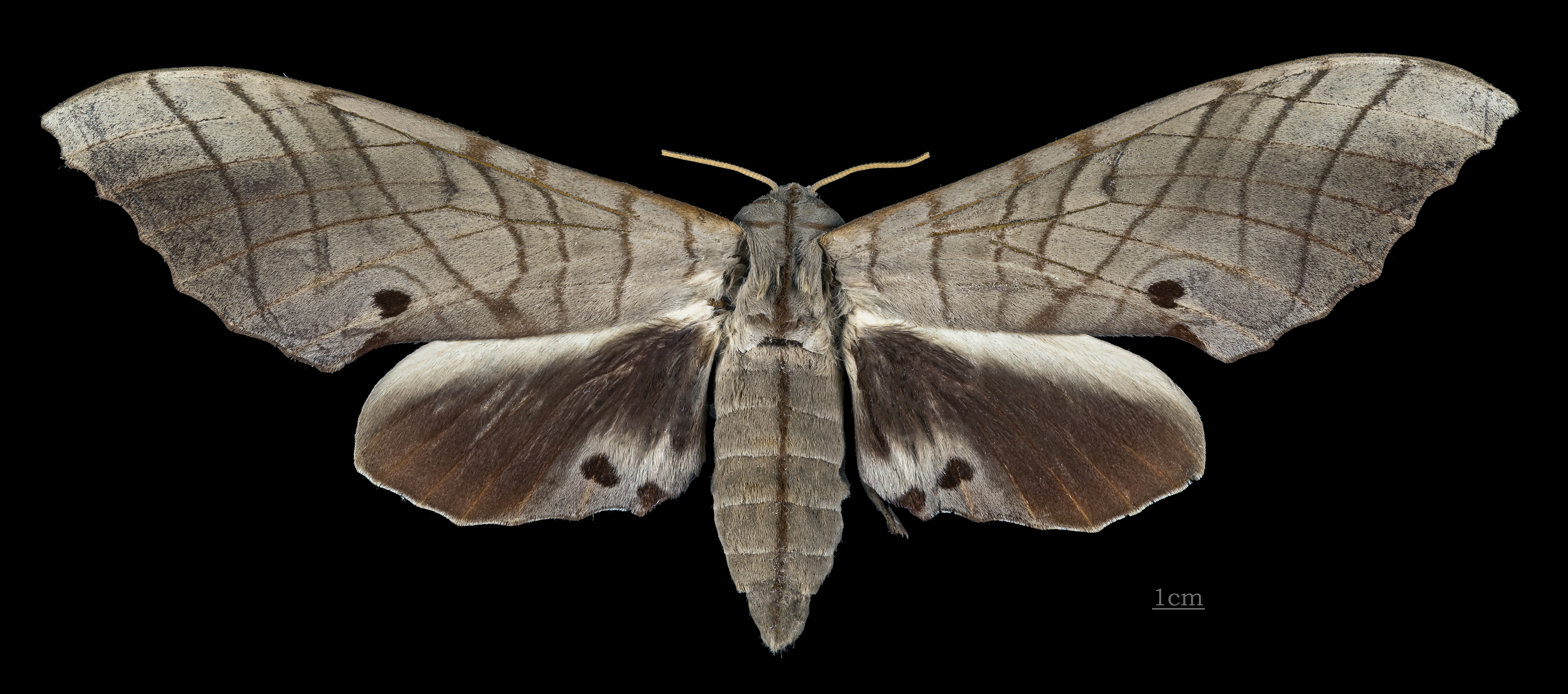
Female M. s. sumatranus, dorsal view

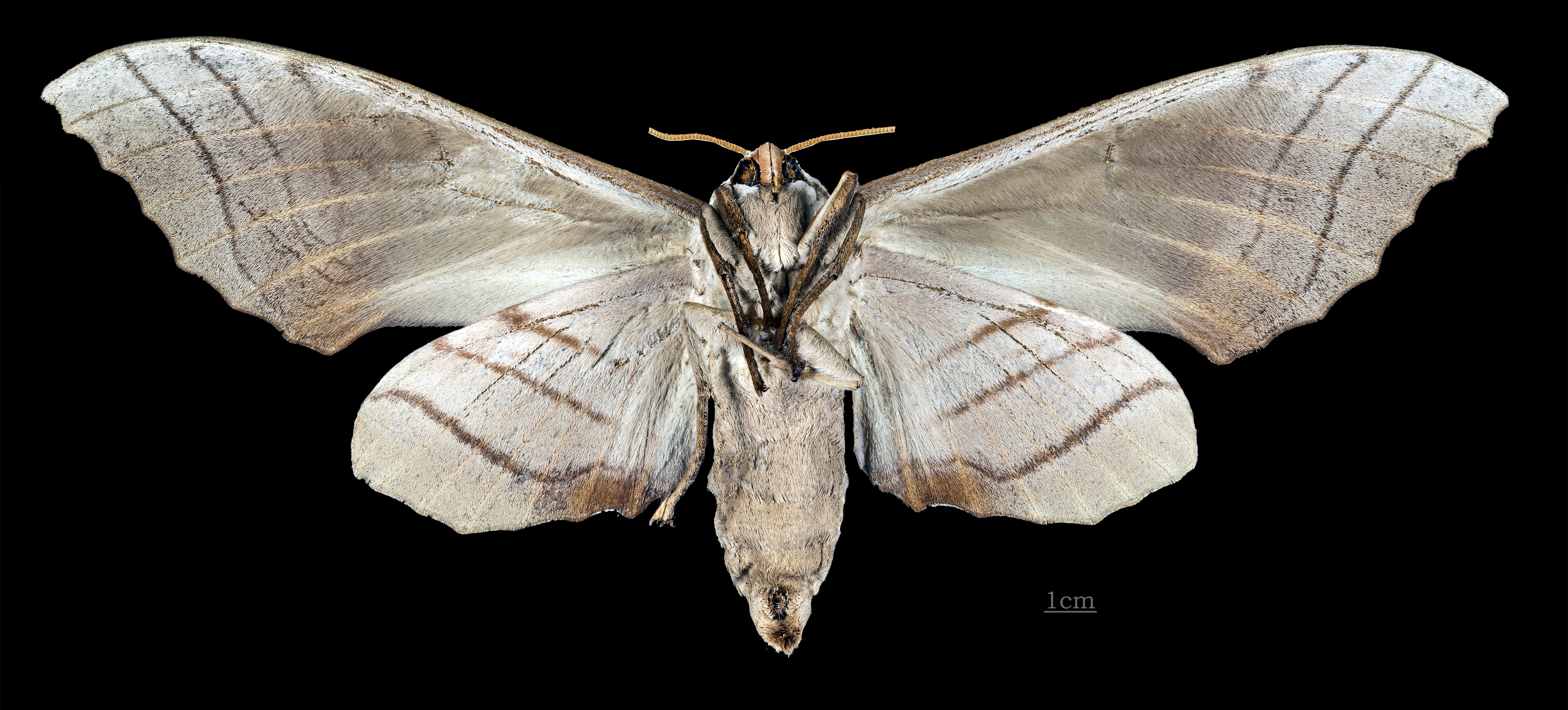
Female M. s. sumatranus, ventral view

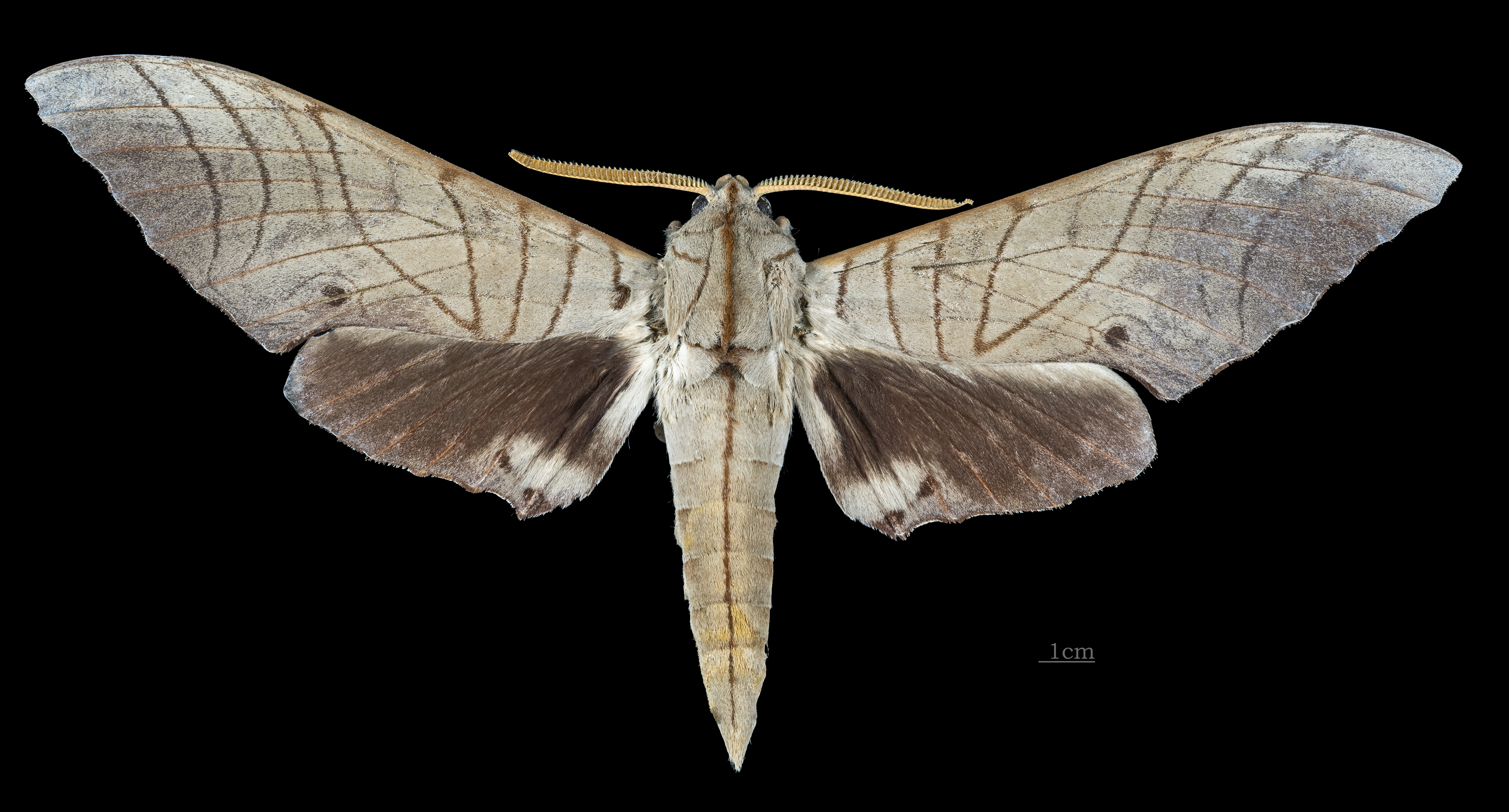
Male M. s. sumatranus, dorsal view

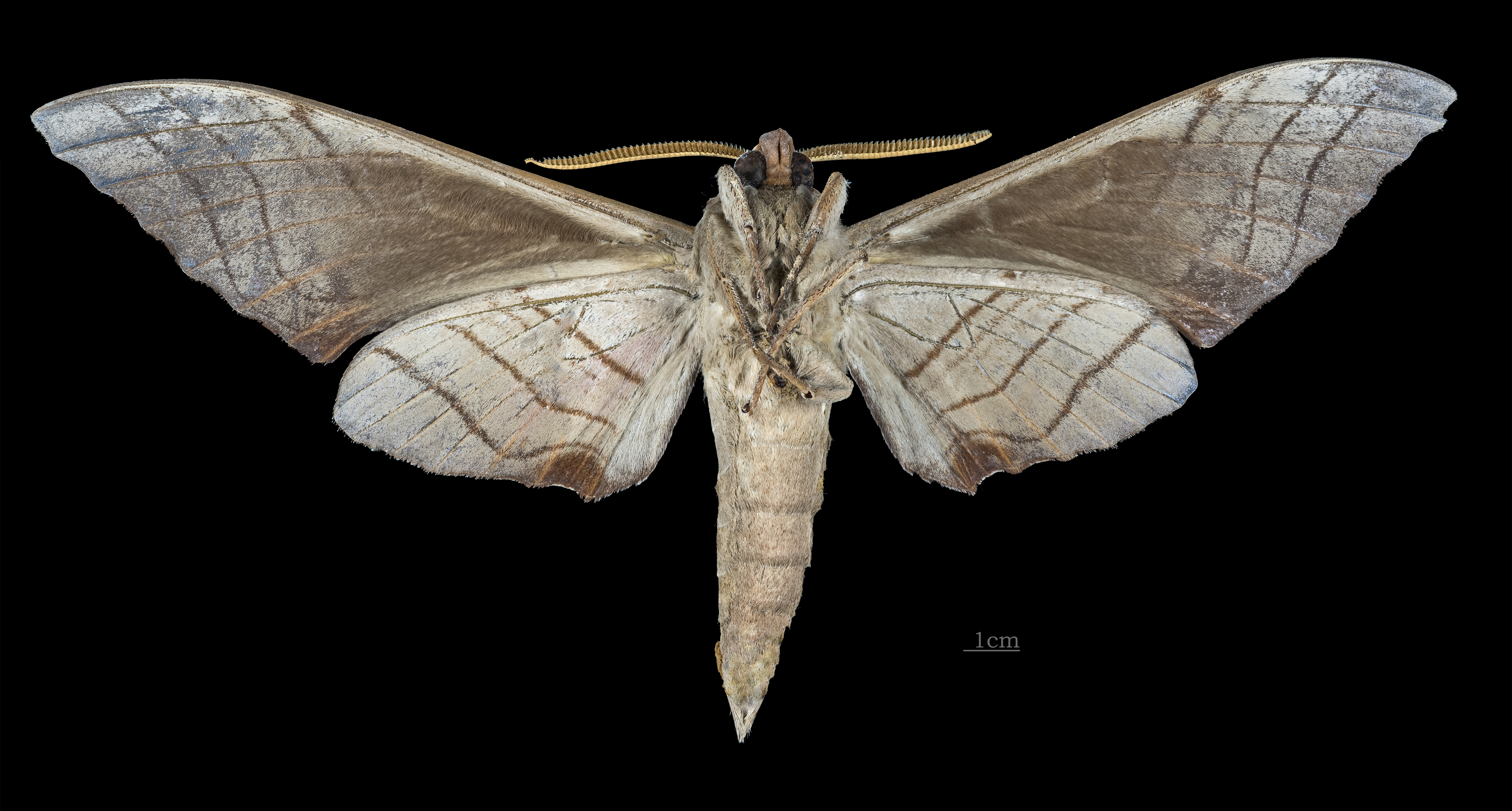
Male M. s. sumatranus, ventral view
