= Lithocarpus coopertus =

Conservation status
- Least Concern (IUCN 3.1)

Scientific classification
- Kingdom: Plantae
- Clade: Embryophytes
- Clade: Tracheophytes
- Clade: Spermatophytes
- Clade: Angiosperms
- Clade: Eudicots
- Clade: Rosids
- Order: Fagales
- Family: Fagaceae
- Genus: Lithocarpus
- Species: L. coopertus

Binomial name
- Lithocarpus coopertus (Blanco) Rehder

Synonyms
- Castanea cooperta (Blanco) Oerst.; Castanopsis reflexa (King ex Hook.f.) Rehder; Corylopasania reflexa (King ex Hook.f.) Nakai; Lithocarpus boholensis (Merr.) Rehder; Lithocarpus reflexus (King ex Hook.f.) A.Camus; Quercus boholensis Merr.; Quercus cooperta Blanco; Quercus fernandezii Vidal; Quercus reflexa King ex Hook.f.; Synaedrys cooperta (Blanco) Koidz.; Synaedrys reflexa (King ex Hook.f.) Koidz.

Species of tree

Lithocarpus coopertus is a tree in the family Fagaceae. The specific epithet coopertus means 'covered over', referring to the acorn.

== Description ==
Lithocarpus coopertus grows as a tree up to 35 metres (110 ft) tall with a trunk diameter of up to 70 cm (28 in). The greyish brown bark is smooth, flaky or lenticellate. The coriaceous leaves measure up to 14 cm (6 in) long. Its brown acorns are ovoid to conical and measure up to 2 cm (0.8 in) across.

== Distribution and habitat ==
Lithocarpus coopertus grows naturally in Peninsular Malaysia, Borneo and the Philippines. Its habitat is dipterocarp, peat swamp and kerangas forests up to 900 m (3,000 ft) elevation.

== Uses ==
The timber is used locally in home construction and for firewood.
