= Acrocercops vallata =

Scientific classification
- Kingdom: Animalia
- Phylum: Arthropoda
- Class: Insecta
- Order: Lepidoptera
- Family: Gracillariidae
- Genus: Acrocercops
- Species: A. vallata

Binomial name
- Acrocercops vallata Kumata & Kuroko, 1988

Species of moth

Acrocercops vallata is a moth of the family Gracillariidae. It is known from Japan (Honshū, Kyūshū, Shikoku).

The wingspan is 7.5–8 mm.

The larvae feed on Quercus acuta, Quercus glauca and Quercus salicina. They mine the leaves of their host plant.
