= Dactylispa chiayiana =

Scientific classification
- Kingdom: Animalia
- Phylum: Arthropoda
- Class: Insecta
- Order: Coleoptera
- Suborder: Polyphaga
- Infraorder: Cucujiformia
- Family: Chrysomelidae
- Genus: Dactylispa
- Species: D. chiayiana

Binomial name
- Dactylispa chiayiana Kimoto, 1978

Species of beetle

Dactylispa chiayiana is a species of beetle of the family Chrysomelidae. It is found in Taiwan.

== Life history ==
The recorded host plants for this species are Cyclobalanopsis glauca, Cyclobalanopsis salicina and Cyclobalanopsis stenophylloides.
