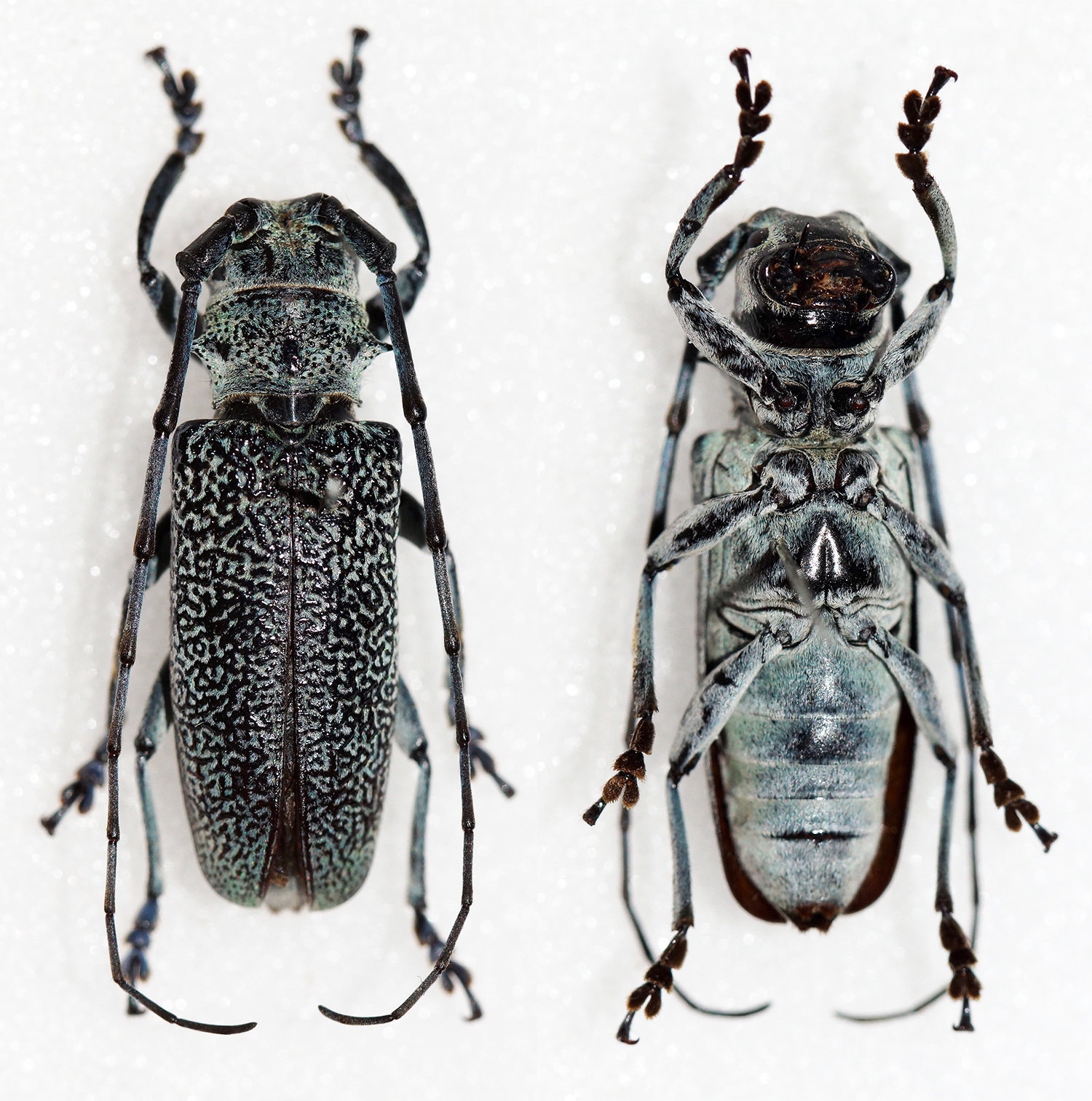

Scientific classification
- Kingdom: Animalia
- Phylum: Arthropoda
- Class: Insecta
- Order: Coleoptera
- Suborder: Polyphaga
- Infraorder: Cucujiformia
- Family: Cerambycidae
- Genus: Monochamus
- Species: M. guerryi

Binomial name
- Monochamus guerryi Pic, 1903

Synonyms
- Melanauster granulipennis Breuning, 1938; Tibetobia guerryi (Pic, 1903)

= Monochamus guerryi =

Species of beetle

Monochamus guerryi is a species of beetle in the family Cerambycidae. It was described by Maurice Pic in 1903. It is known from Myanmar, China, and Thailand. It feeds on Pinus kesiya, Castanea mollissima, Malus pumila, and Quercus glauca.
