= Ring-cupped oak =

Ring-cupped oak or ring-cup oak may refer to:

- Quercus glauca, an oak species native to eastern and southern Asia
- Oaks belonging to Quercus sect. Cyclobalanopsis
