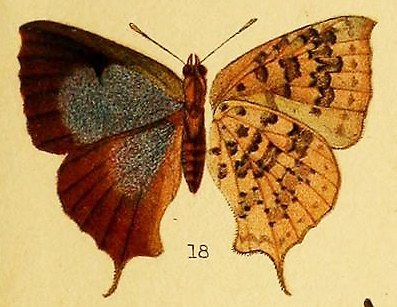
- Arhopala comica, female, Upper Burma, from original description.

Scientific classification
- Kingdom: Animalia
- Phylum: Arthropoda
- Clade: Pancrustacea
- Class: Insecta
- Order: Lepidoptera
- Family: Lycaenidae
- Genus: Arhopala
- Species: A. comica

Binomial name
- Arhopala comica (de Nicéville, 1900)

Synonyms
- Arhopala dodonaea comica [form]; Surendra learmondi Tytler, 1940; Narathura comica (de Nicéville)

= Arhopala comica =

Comic oakblue

Species of butterfly

Arhopala comica, the comic oakblue, is a butterfly in the family Lycaenidae. It was described by Lionel de Nicéville in 1862. It is found in the Indomalayan realm (Manipur, Burma, Thailand).

== Description ==
Described as an aberration of Arhopala japonica, it is above like dodonaea, beneath with a denser, more intense colouring and somewhat removed macular markings.
