= Cryptolectica pasaniae =

Scientific classification
- Kingdom: Animalia
- Phylum: Arthropoda
- Class: Insecta
- Order: Lepidoptera
- Family: Gracillariidae
- Genus: Cryptolectica
- Species: C. pasaniae

Binomial name
- Cryptolectica pasaniae Kumata & Kuroko, 1988

Species of moth

Cryptolectica pasaniae is a moth of the family Gracillariidae. It is known from Hong Kong and Japan (the Ryukyu Islands).

The wingspan is 8.0–10.2 mm.

The larvae feed on Lithocarpus edulis, Pasania edulis and Quercus myrsinifolia. They probably mine the leaves of their host plant.
