= Dolichoprosopus sameshimai =

Scientific classification
- Kingdom: Animalia
- Phylum: Arthropoda
- Class: Insecta
- Order: Coleoptera
- Suborder: Polyphaga
- Infraorder: Cucujiformia
- Family: Cerambycidae
- Genus: Dolichoprosopus
- Species: D. sameshimai

Binomial name
- Dolichoprosopus sameshimai N. Ohbayashi, 2001

Species of beetle

Dolichoprosopus sameshimai is a species of beetle in the family Cerambycidae. It was described by N. Ohbayashi in 2001. It is known from Japan. It feeds on Lithocarpus edulis.
