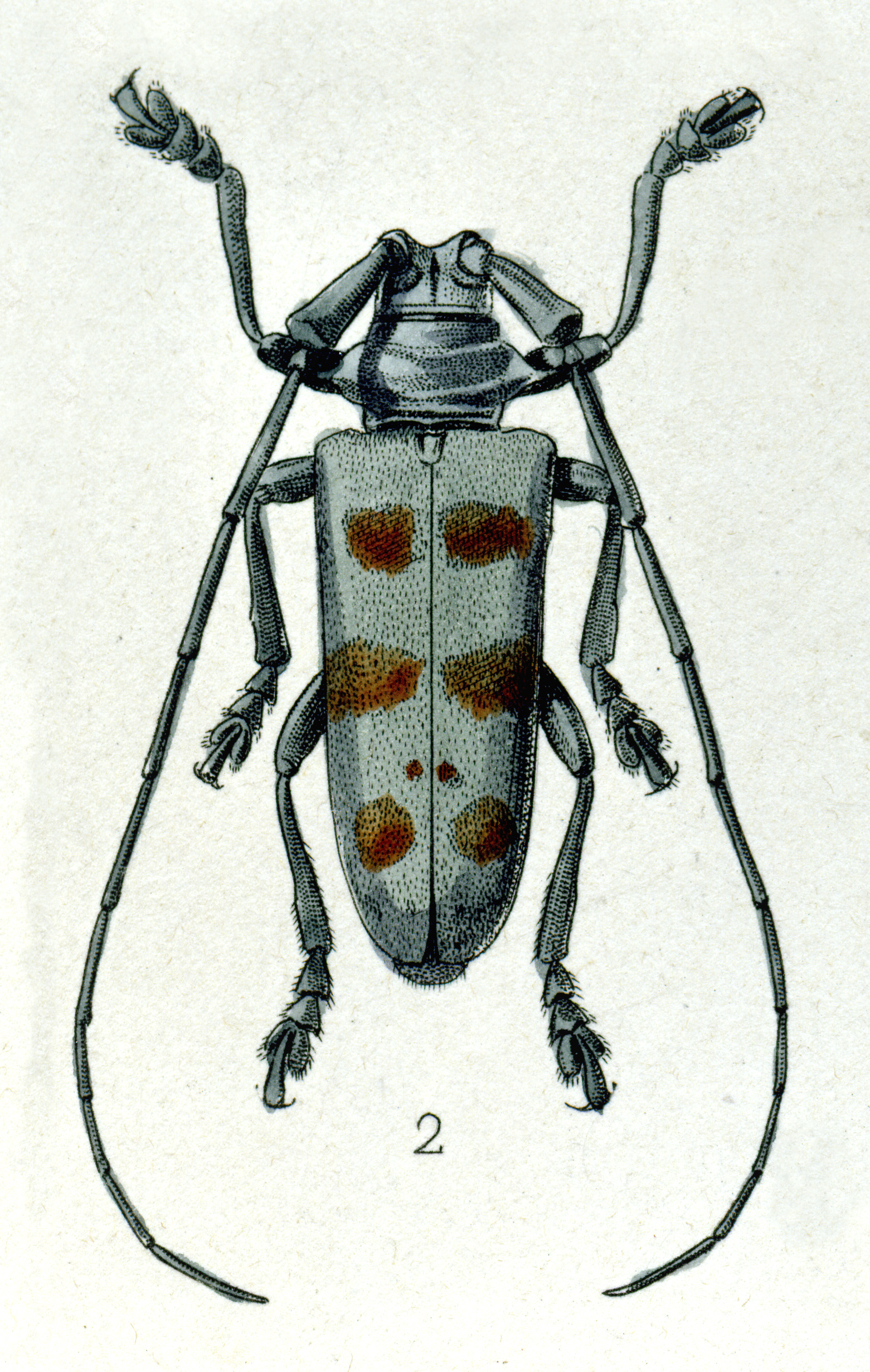

Scientific classification
- Kingdom: Animalia
- Phylum: Arthropoda
- Class: Insecta
- Order: Coleoptera
- Suborder: Polyphaga
- Infraorder: Cucujiformia
- Family: Cerambycidae
- Genus: Dolichoprosopus
- Species: D. lethalis

Binomial name
- Dolichoprosopus lethalis (Pascoe, 1866)

Synonyms
- Nemophas lethalis Pascoe, 1866

= Dolichoprosopus lethalis =

Species of beetle

Dolichoprosopus lethalis is a species of beetle in the family Cerambycidae. It was described by Francis Polkinghorne Pascoe in 1866. It is known from Moluccas.

== Subspecies ==
- Dolichoprosopus lethalis canescens Neervoort van der Poll, 1890
- Dolichoprosopus lethalis lethalis (Pascoe, 1866)
- Dolichoprosopus lethalis maculatus Ritsema, 1881
