= Cryptolectica monodecta =

Scientific classification
- Kingdom: Animalia
- Phylum: Arthropoda
- Class: Insecta
- Order: Lepidoptera
- Family: Gracillariidae
- Genus: Cryptolectica
- Species: C. monodecta

Binomial name
- Cryptolectica monodecta (Meyrick, 1912)

Synonyms
- Acrocercops monodecta Meyrick, 1912

Species of moth

Cryptolectica monodecta is a moth of the family Gracillariidae. It is known from South Africa.
