= Cryptolectica ensiformis =

Scientific classification
- Domain: Eukaryota
- Kingdom: Animalia
- Phylum: Arthropoda
- Class: Insecta
- Order: Lepidoptera
- Family: Gracillariidae
- Genus: Cryptolectica
- Species: C. ensiformis

Binomial name
- Cryptolectica ensiformis (Yuan, 1986)

Synonyms
- Acrocercops ensiformis Yuan, 1986

Species of moth

Cryptolectica ensiformis is a moth of the family Gracillariidae. It is known from China (Hainan), India, Indonesia (Sulawesi), Japan (Tusima, the Ryukyu Islands, Honshū, Kyūshū, Shikoku) and Thailand.

The wingspan is 9.2–11 mm.

The larvae feed on Quercus acuta and Quercus sessilifolia. They probably mine the leaves of their host plant.
