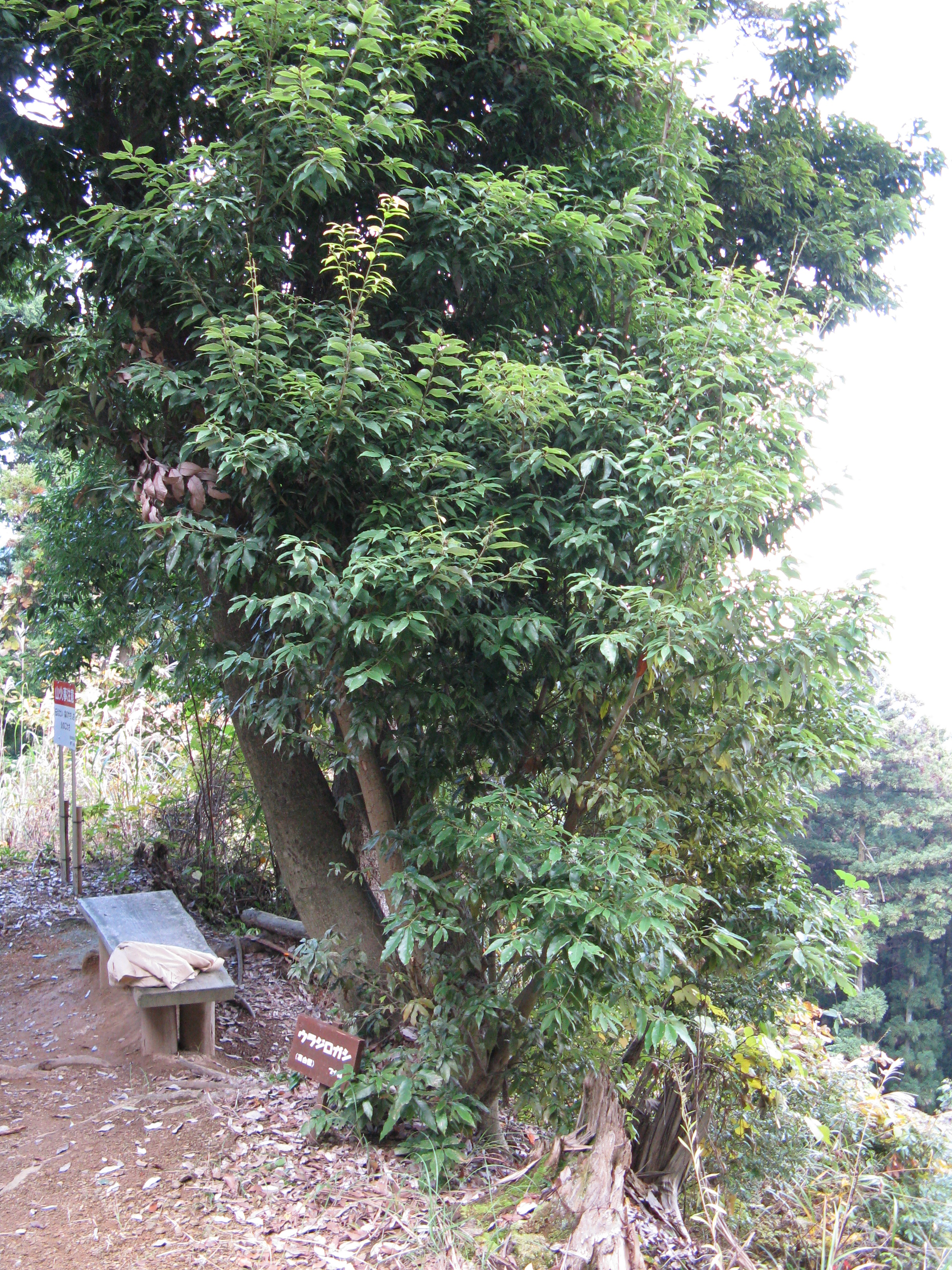

Conservation status
- Least Concern (IUCN 3.1)

Scientific classification
- Kingdom: Plantae
- Clade: Embryophytes
- Clade: Tracheophytes
- Clade: Spermatophytes
- Clade: Angiosperms
- Clade: Eudicots
- Clade: Rosids
- Order: Fagales
- Family: Fagaceae
- Genus: Quercus
- Subgenus: Quercus subg. Cerris
- Section: Quercus sect. Cyclobalanopsis
- Species: Q. salicina

Binomial name
- Quercus salicina Blume

Synonyms
- Cyclobalanopsis angustissima (Makino) Kudô & Masam.; Cyclobalanopsis salicina (Blume) Oerst.; Cyclobalanopsis salicina f. angustata (Nakai) Honda; Cyclobalanopsis salicina f. latifolia (Nakai) Honda; Cyclobalanopsis salicina var. stenophylla (Blume) Honda; Cyclobalanopsis stenophylla (Blume) Schottky; Cyclobalanopsis stenophylla var. angustata (Nakai) Nakai; Quercus angustissima Makino; Quercus glauca var. salicina (Blume) Menitsky; Quercus glauca var. stenophylla Blume; Quercus salicina f. angustata (Nakai) H.Ohba; Quercus salicina f. latifolia (Nakai) H.Ohba; Quercus salicina var. stenophylla (Blume) Hatus.; Quercus stenophylla (Blume) Makino; Quercus stenophylla var. angustata Nakai; Quercus stenophylla var. latifolia Nakai; Quercus stenophylla var. salicina Makino

= Quercus salicina =

Species of oak tree

Quercus salicina is an oak species found in Japan, South Korea and Taiwan. It is placed in subgenus Cerris, section Cyclobalanopsis.

The larvae of the Japanese oakblue (Arhopala japonica), of Acrocercops vallata and Marumba sperchius feed on Q. salicina.

Stenophyllanin A, a tannin, and other quinic acid gallates can be found in Q. salicina. The triterpene friedelin can also be isolated from the leaves of the tree.
