= Dolichoprosopus subcylindricus =

Scientific classification
- Kingdom: Animalia
- Phylum: Arthropoda
- Class: Insecta
- Order: Coleoptera
- Suborder: Polyphaga
- Infraorder: Cucujiformia
- Family: Cerambycidae
- Genus: Dolichoprosopus
- Species: D. subcylindricus

Binomial name
- Dolichoprosopus subcylindricus (Aurivillius, 1927)

Synonyms
- Nemophas subcylindricus Aurivillius, 1927; Nemophas subcylindricus ab. virescens Aurivillius, 1927; Nemophas zonatoides Breuning, 1980

Species of beetle

Dolichoprosopus subcylindricus is a species of beetle in the family Cerambycidae. It was described by Per Olof Christopher Aurivillius in 1927, originally under the genus Nemophas. It is known from the Philippines.
