= Cryptolectica lazaroi =

Scientific classification
- Kingdom: Animalia
- Phylum: Arthropoda
- Clade: Pancrustacea
- Class: Insecta
- Order: Lepidoptera
- Family: Gracillariidae
- Genus: Cryptolectica
- Species: C. lazaroi

Binomial name
- Cryptolectica lazaroi Landry, 2006

Species of moth

Cryptolectica lazaroi is a moth of the family Gracillariidae. It is known from the Galápagos Islands.

The larvae feed on Ageratum conyzoides and Synedrella nodiflora. They probably mine the leaves of their host plant.
