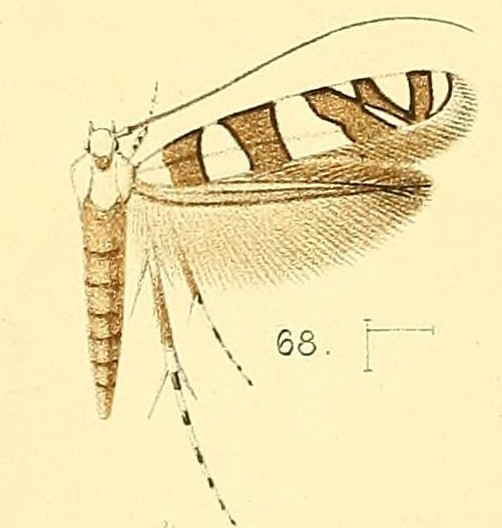

Scientific classification
- Kingdom: Animalia
- Phylum: Arthropoda
- Class: Insecta
- Order: Lepidoptera
- Family: Gracillariidae
- Genus: Cryptolectica
- Species: C. bifasciata

Binomial name
- Cryptolectica bifasciata (Walsingham, 1891)

Synonyms
- Gracilaria bifasciata Walsingham, 1891; Acrocercops bifasciata – Bland, 1980

= Cryptolectica bifasciata =

Species of moth

Cryptolectica bifasciata is a moth of the family Gracillariidae.

== Distribution ==
It is known from Sub-Saharan Africa, with records from Cameroon, the Democratic Republic of Congo, Gambia, Kenya, Malawi, Nigeria, Somalia, Sudan, Tanzania, and South Africa, and from India.

The larvae feed on Malvaceae, including okra (Abelmoschus esculentus), Abutilon species, Gossypium species (including Gossypium barbadense), Malva species, and Urena lobata. They probably mine the leaves of their host plant. It is parasitized by the eulophid parasitoid Crateulophus somalicus.
