= Cryptolectica chrysalis =

Scientific classification
- Kingdom: Animalia
- Phylum: Arthropoda
- Class: Insecta
- Order: Lepidoptera
- Family: Gracillariidae
- Genus: Cryptolectica
- Species: C. chrysalis

Binomial name
- Cryptolectica chrysalis Kumata & Ermolaev, 1988

Species of moth

Cryptolectica chrysalis is a moth of the family Gracillariidae. It is known from Japan (Hokkaidō, Honshū) and the Russian Far East.

The wingspan is 9–11 mm.

The larvae feed on Quercus mongolica and Quercus serrata. They probably mine the leaves of their host plant.
