= Dolichoprosopus yokoyamai =

Scientific classification
- Kingdom: Animalia
- Phylum: Arthropoda
- Class: Insecta
- Order: Coleoptera
- Suborder: Polyphaga
- Infraorder: Cucujiformia
- Family: Cerambycidae
- Genus: Dolichoprosopus
- Species: D. yokoyamai

Binomial name
- Dolichoprosopus yokoyamai (Gressitt, 1937)

Synonyms
- Monochamus yokoyamai Gressitt, 1937; Dolichoprosopus yokohamai Gressitt, 1937 (misspelling)

Species of beetle

Dolichoprosopus yokoyamai is a species of beetle in the family Cerambycidae. It was described by Gressitt in 1937. It is known from Japan. It feeds on Fagus crenata.
