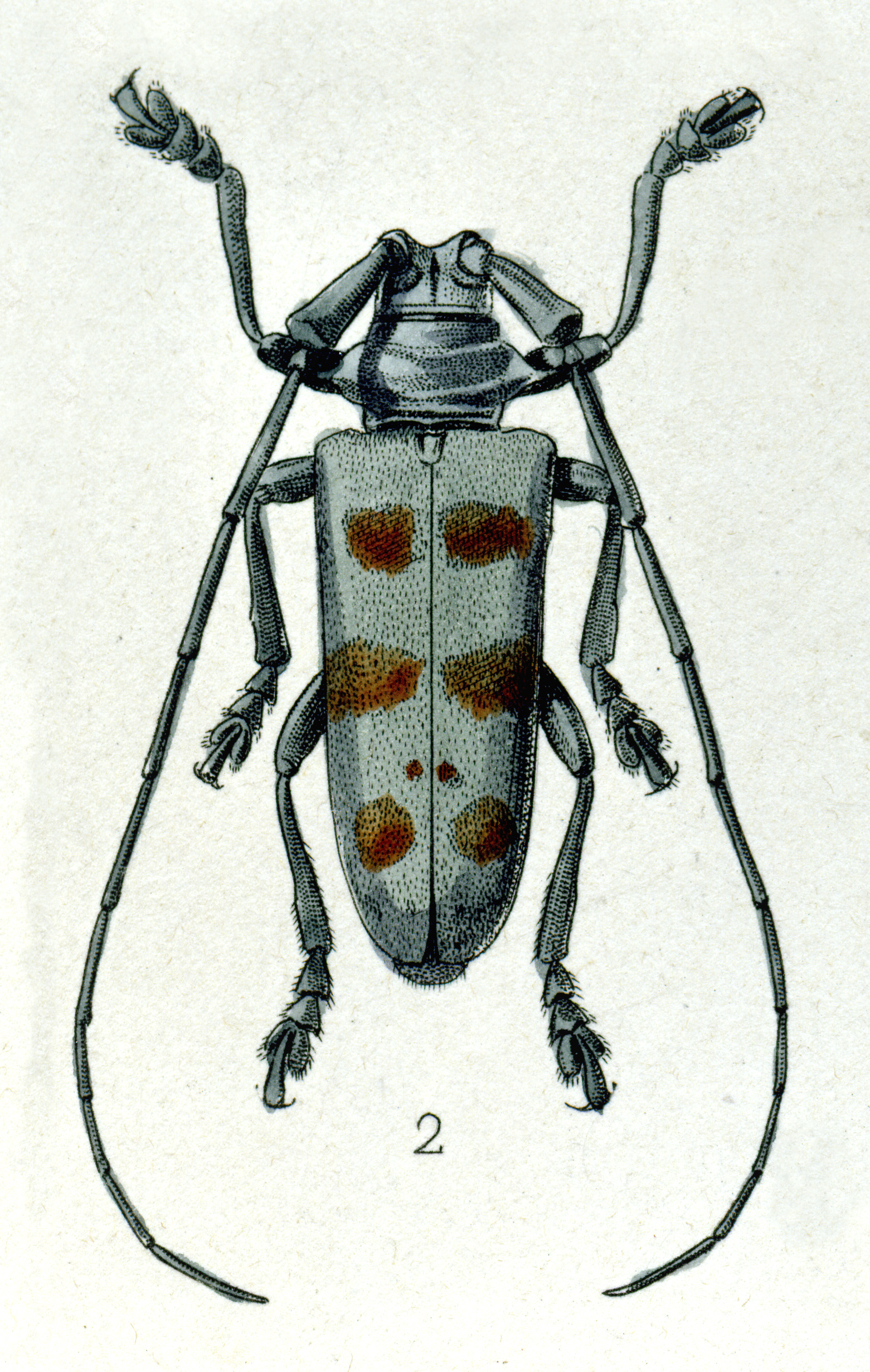
- Dolichoprosopus lethalis

Scientific classification
- Kingdom: Animalia
- Phylum: Arthropoda
- Class: Insecta
- Order: Coleoptera
- Suborder: Polyphaga
- Infraorder: Cucujiformia
- Family: Cerambycidae
- Tribe: Lamiini
- Genus: Dolichoprosopus

= Dolichoprosopus =

Genus of beetles

Dolichoprosopus is a genus of longhorn beetles of the subfamily Lamiinae, containing the following species:

- Dolichoprosopus lethalis (Pascoe, 1866)
- Dolichoprosopus philippinensis Breuning, 1980
- Dolichoprosopus rondoni Breuning, 1965
- Dolichoprosopus sameshimai N. Ohbayashi, 2001
- Dolichoprosopus subcylindricus (Aurivillius, 1927)
- Dolichoprosopus yokoyamai (Gressitt, 1937)
