= Cryptolectica capnodecta =

Scientific classification
- Kingdom: Animalia
- Phylum: Arthropoda
- Class: Insecta
- Order: Lepidoptera
- Family: Gracillariidae
- Genus: Cryptolectica
- Species: C. capnodecta

Binomial name
- Cryptolectica capnodecta Vári, 1961

Species of moth

Cryptolectica capnodecta is a moth of the family Gracillariidae. The species is known from South Africa.
