= Dolichoprosopus rondoni =

Scientific classification
- Kingdom: Animalia
- Phylum: Arthropoda
- Class: Insecta
- Order: Coleoptera
- Suborder: Polyphaga
- Infraorder: Cucujiformia
- Family: Cerambycidae
- Genus: Dolichoprosopus
- Species: D. rondoni

Binomial name
- Dolichoprosopus rondoni Breuning, 1965

Species of beetle

Dolichoprosopus rondoni is a species of beetle in the family Cerambycidae. It was described by Stephan von Breuning in 1965. It is known from Laos.
