= Cryptolectica euryphanta =

Scientific classification
- Kingdom: Animalia
- Phylum: Arthropoda
- Class: Insecta
- Order: Lepidoptera
- Family: Gracillariidae
- Genus: Cryptolectica
- Species: C. euryphanta

Binomial name
- Cryptolectica euryphanta (Meyrick, 1911)

Synonyms
- Acrocercops euryphanta Meyrick, 1911

Species of moth

Cryptolectica euryphanta is a moth of the family Gracillariidae. It is known from Namibia, the Seychelles and South Africa.
