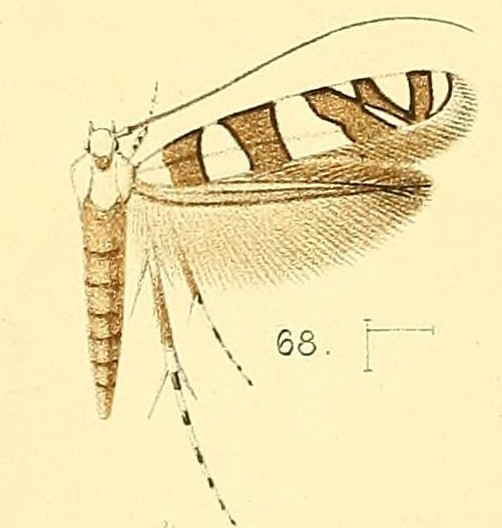
- Cryptolectica bifasciata

Scientific classification
- Kingdom: Animalia
- Phylum: Arthropoda
- Class: Insecta
- Order: Lepidoptera
- Family: Gracillariidae
- Subfamily: Acrocercopinae
- Genus: Cryptolectica; Vári, 1961

Species
- See text

= Cryptolectica =

Genus of moths

Cryptolectica is a genus of moths in the family Gracillariidae.

== Species ==
There are eight recognized species:

- Cryptolectica bifasciata (Walsingham, 1891)
- Cryptolectica capnodecta Vári, 1961
- Cryptolectica chrysalis Kumata & Ermolaev, 1988
- Cryptolectica ensiformis (Yuan, 1986)
- Cryptolectica euryphanta (Meyrick, 1911)
- Cryptolectica lazaroi Landry, 2006
- Cryptolectica monodecta (Meyrick, 1912)
- Cryptolectica pasaniae Kumata & Kuroko, 1988
