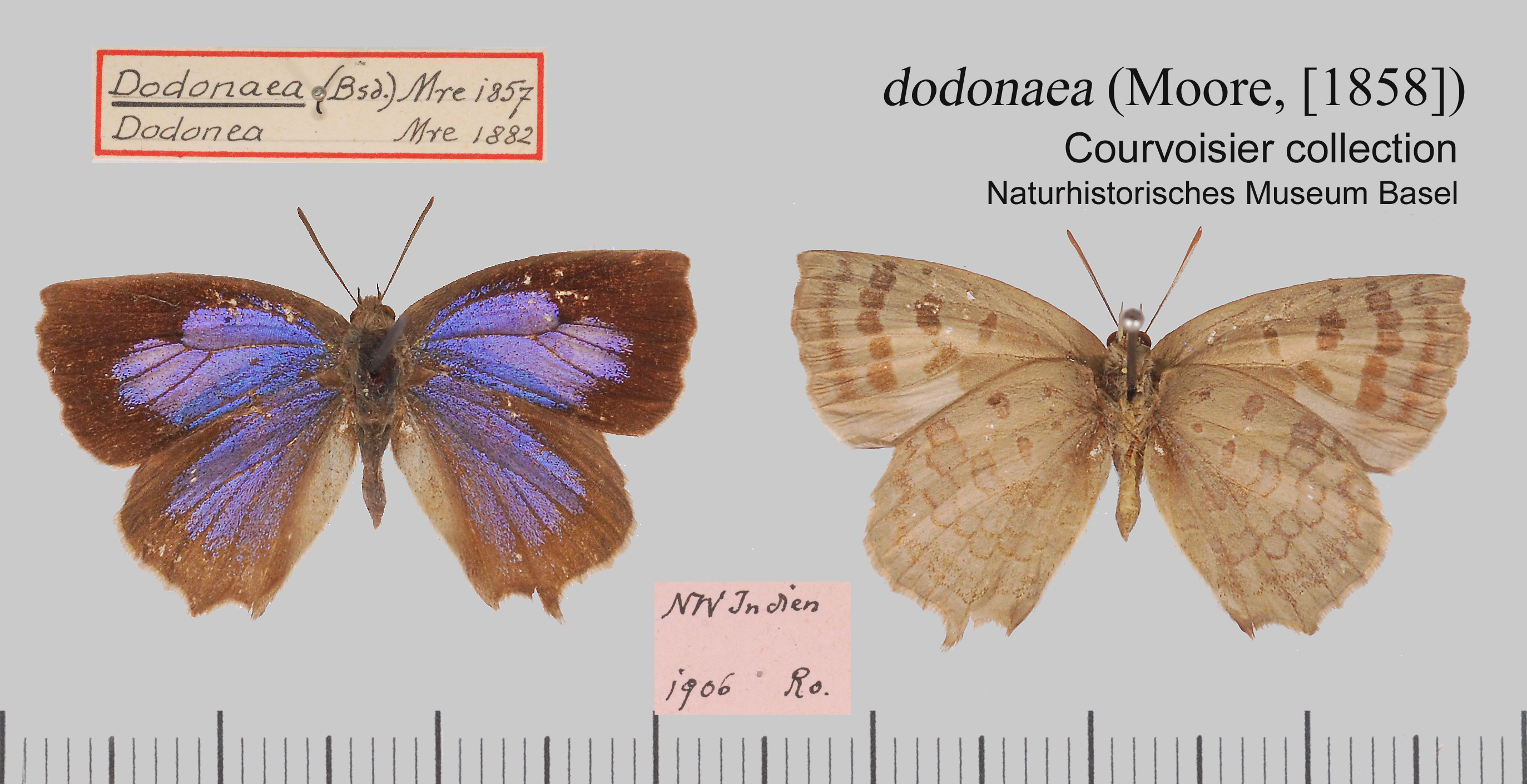
- Male, Courvoisier Collection, Basel
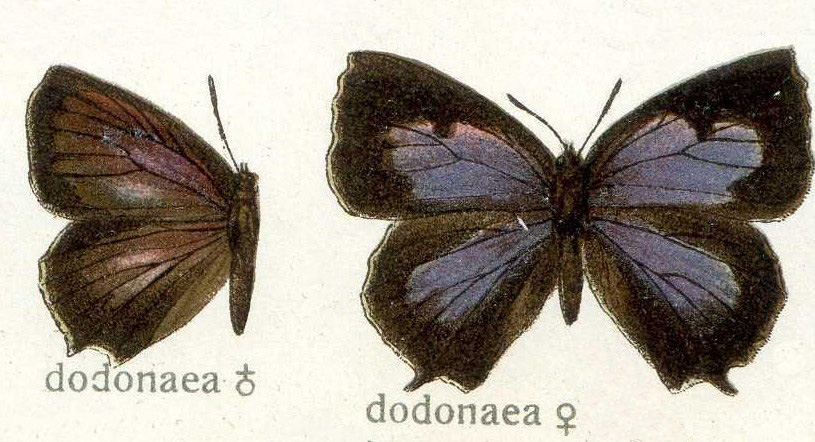
- Male on left, the female is always larger

Scientific classification
- Kingdom: Animalia
- Phylum: Arthropoda
- Clade: Pancrustacea
- Class: Insecta
- Order: Lepidoptera
- Family: Lycaenidae
- Genus: Arhopala
- Species: A. dodonaea

Binomial name
- Arhopala dodonaea Moore, 1857

Synonyms
- Amblypodia dodonaea Moore, 1857

= Arhopala dodonaea =

Pale Himalayan oakblue

Species of butterfly

Arhopala dodonaea, the pale Himalayan oakblue, (sometimes listed as a synonym of Amblypodia rama) is a small butterfly found in India that belongs to the lycaenids or blues family.

== Description ==
Both male and female are blue with a broad border. The underside is grey. The female forewing termen is markedly crenulate.

== Range ==
The butterfly occurs in India (Kumaon) and Pakistan. Afghanistan, Northwest Himalaya - Sikkim, Chitral.

== Status ==
William Harry Evans reported that the species was common in 1932.

== See also ==
- List of butterflies of India (Lycaenidae)
