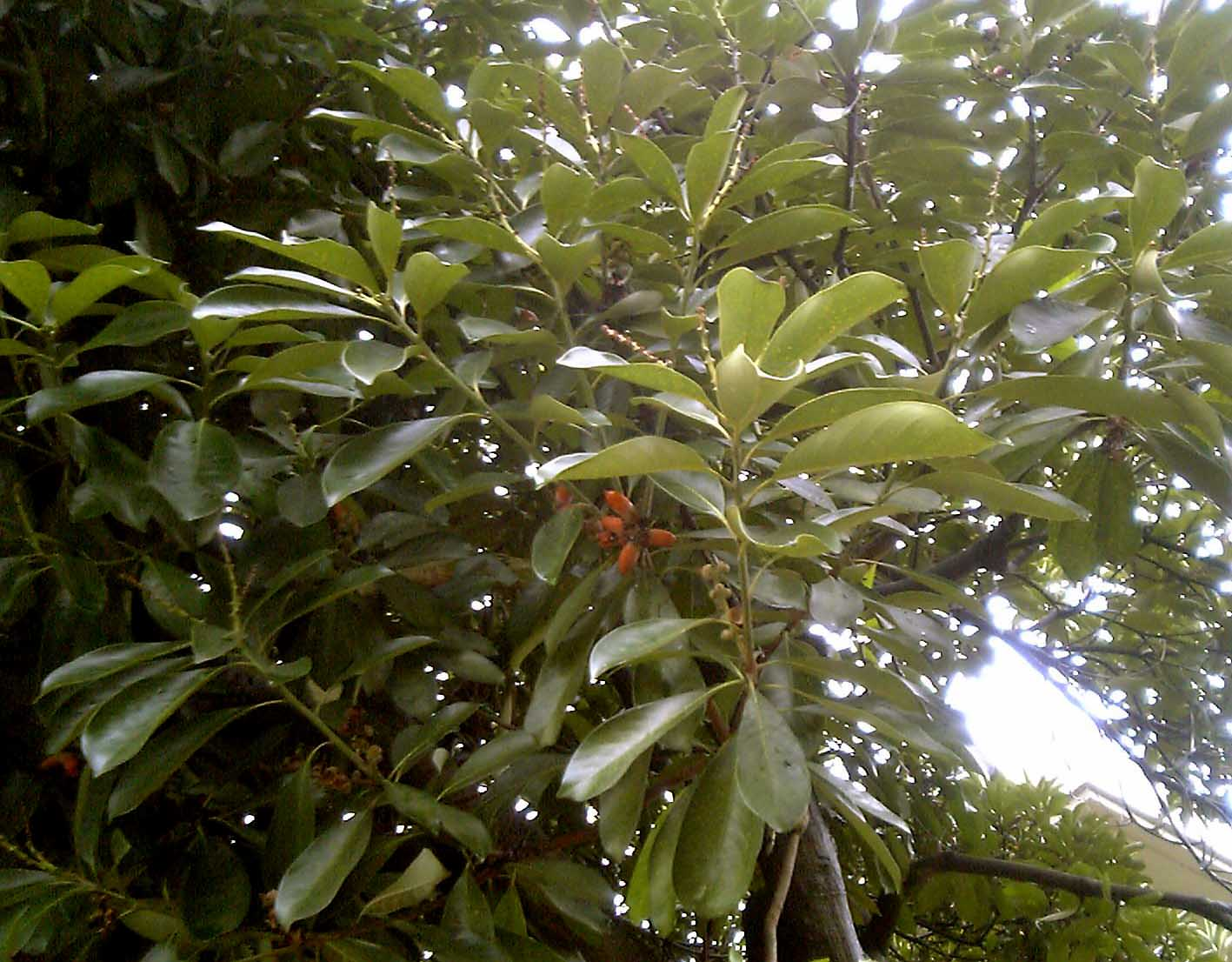
- Lithocarpus edulis, Kantō region, Japan

Scientific classification
- Kingdom: Plantae
- Clade: Tracheophytes
- Clade: Angiosperms
- Clade: Eudicots
- Clade: Rosids
- Order: Fagales
- Family: Fagaceae
- Subfamily: Quercoideae
- Genus: Lithocarpus; Blume

Species
- See text

Diversity
- c. 340 species

Synonyms
- Pasania Oerst.

= Lithocarpus =

Lithocarpus Temporal range: Eocene–Recent

Genus of plants

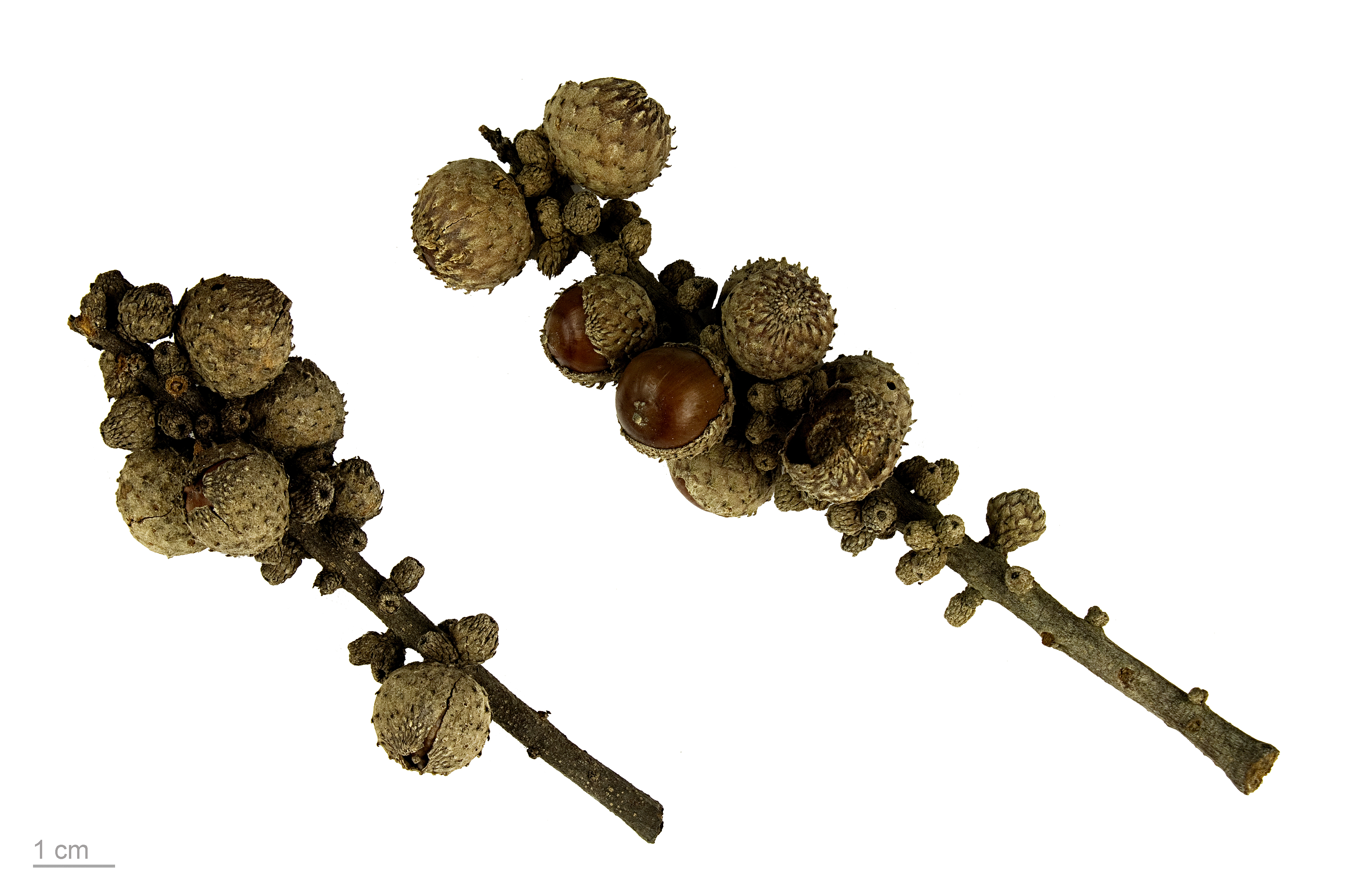
Lithocarpus sp. - MHNT

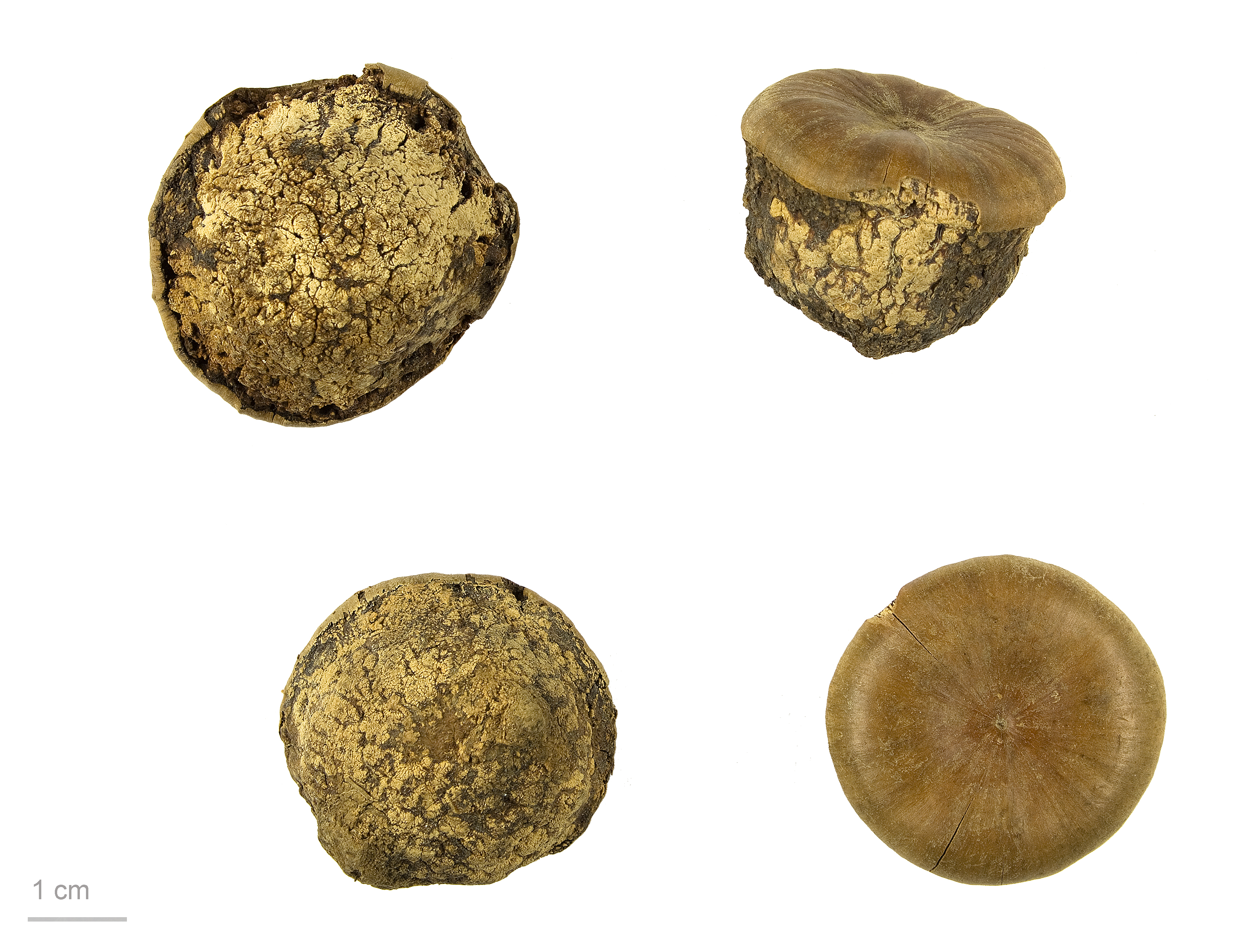
Lithocarpus sp. - MHNT

Lithocarpus is a genus in the beech family, Fagaceae. Trees in this genus are commonly known as the stone oaks and differ from Quercus primarily because they produce insect-pollinated flowers on erect spikes and the female flowers have short styles with punctate stigmas. At current, around 340 species have been described, mostly restricted to Southeast Asia. Fossils show that Lithocarpus formerly had a wider distribution, being found in North America and Europe during the Eocene to Miocene epochs. The species extend from the foothills of the Hengduan Mountains, where they form dominant stands of trees, through Indochina and the Malayan Archipelago, crossing Wallace's Line and reaching Papua. In general, these trees are most dominant in the uplands (more than 1,000 m or 3,300 ft above sea level) and have many ecological similarities to the Dipterocarpaceae, the dominant lowland tree group. These trees are intolerant of seasonal droughts, not being found on the Lesser Sunda Islands, despite their ability to cross numerous water barriers to reach Papua.

The North American tanoak or tanbark oak (Notholithocarpus densiflorus) was previously included in this genus but recent evidence indicates the similarities in flower and fruit morphology are due to convergent evolution. Both genetic and morphological evidence demonstrate that the tanoak is a distant relative to Asian stone oaks, and therefore tanoak has been moved into a new genus, Notholithocarpus.

Lithocarpus trees are evergreen trees with leathery, alternate leaves, the margins of which are almost always entire, rarely toothed. The seed is a nut similar to an oak acorn with a cupule enclosing the basal part of the fruit. Cupules of stone oaks demonstrate a wide variety in the type and arrangement of lamellae and scales on the outside of the cupule, with some of them completely enclosing the nut, even becoming irregularly dehiscent in a few species. The seeds are often protected by a hard woody shell (hence the genus name, from Greek λίθος, lithos, "stone" and καρπός, karpos, "seed"). In some sections of the genus, the seed is embedded in the basal material of the fruit which becomes highly lignified and hard, lending greater mechanical protection to the seed, creating a novel type of fruit. The kernel is edible in some species (e.g. Lithocarpus edulis), but inedible, and very bitter, in others.

Several of the species are very attractive ornamental trees, used in parks and large gardens in warm temperate and subtropical areas.

== Classification ==
In 1948, Aimee Camus produced a comprehensive treatment of the two major genera in the family, given the specimens available to her at the Natural History Museum in Paris. Because of the many collections available from the French colonies in subtropical and tropical Indochina, she worked extensively with stone oaks from the region. Most importantly, she provided the only existing infrageneric structure within the genus but unfortunately, many of the species from the Malesian region, south of the Isthmus of Kra, are not incorporated into this system.

Her classification system included 13 subgenera, including the subgenus Pasania which is by far the largest division within the genus. About 100 Asian species were treated separately in Pasania, at the genus level, and occasionally the old name persists on some herbarium sheets that have not been annotated. Several of the other subgenera possess fewer than ten species and have distinctive morphologies. Few of the Malesian species are treated in Camus' system and Soepadmo, who wrote the Flora Malesiana treatment, made no attempt to update or integrate these species into Camus' system, therefore a lot of work obviously remains to be done. Camus' system was highly detailed, as three levels of organization are recognized below the subgenus, but the classification is not systematic at the lowest level.

List of subgenera (No. of species in Camus' treatment): Castanicarpus (1); Corylopasania (2); Cryptostylis (1); Cyclobalanus (58); Cyrtobalanus (1); Eulithocarpus (11); Gymnobalanus (10); Liebmannia (3); Oerstedia (1); Pachybalanus (14); Pasania (209); Pseudosynaedrys (9); Synaedrys (15); indeterminate (12).

Early researchers into the family often suggested that the stone oaks were primitive in the family. An exhaustive study of the inflorescence and fruits of 73 species from eight of Camus' subgenera found that important development and evolutionary characters distinguish the major groups in the genus and indicate differences among the genera of the family.

== Species ==
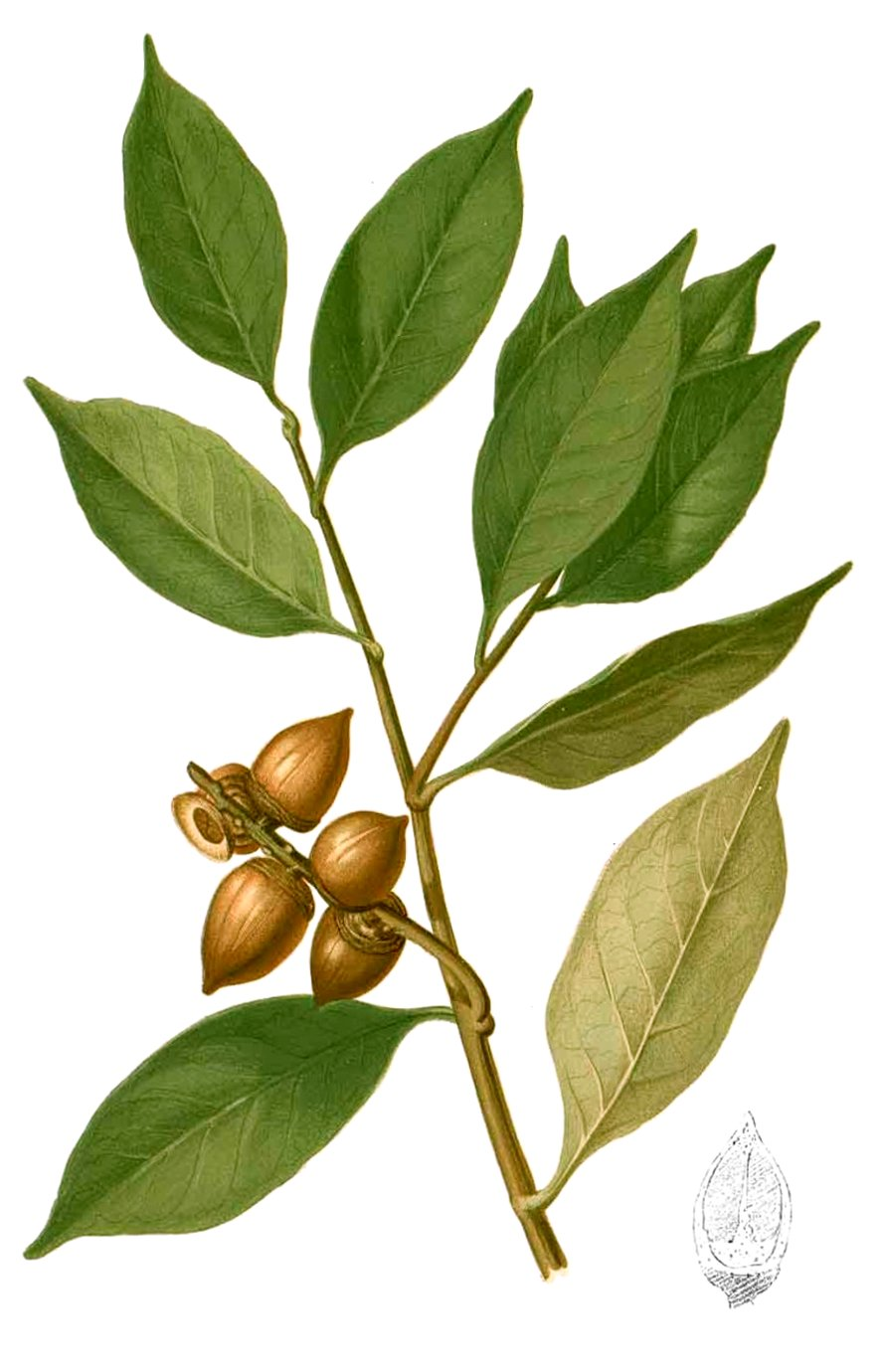
Lithocarpus pseudoreinwardtii

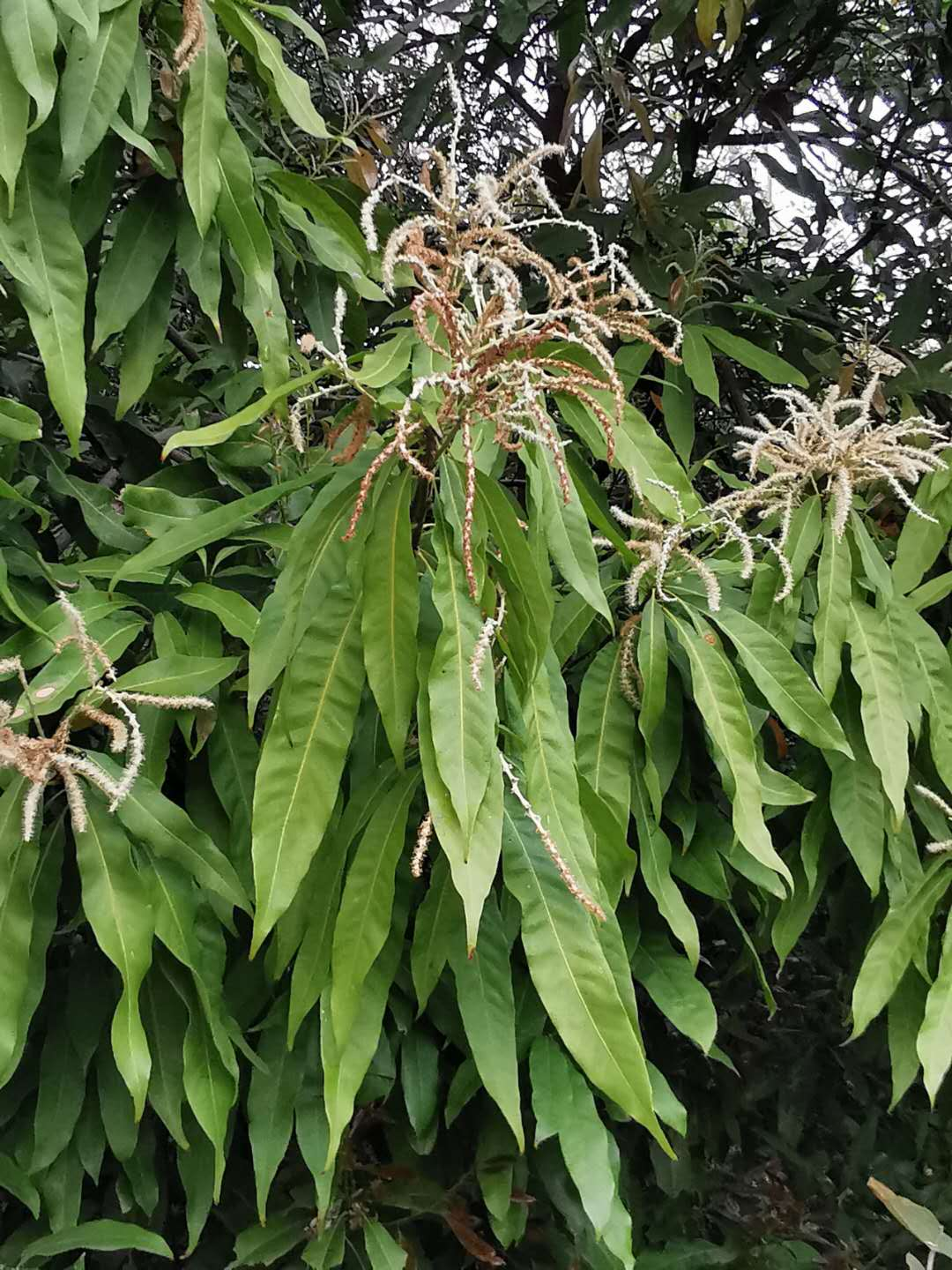
Lithocarpus hancei
