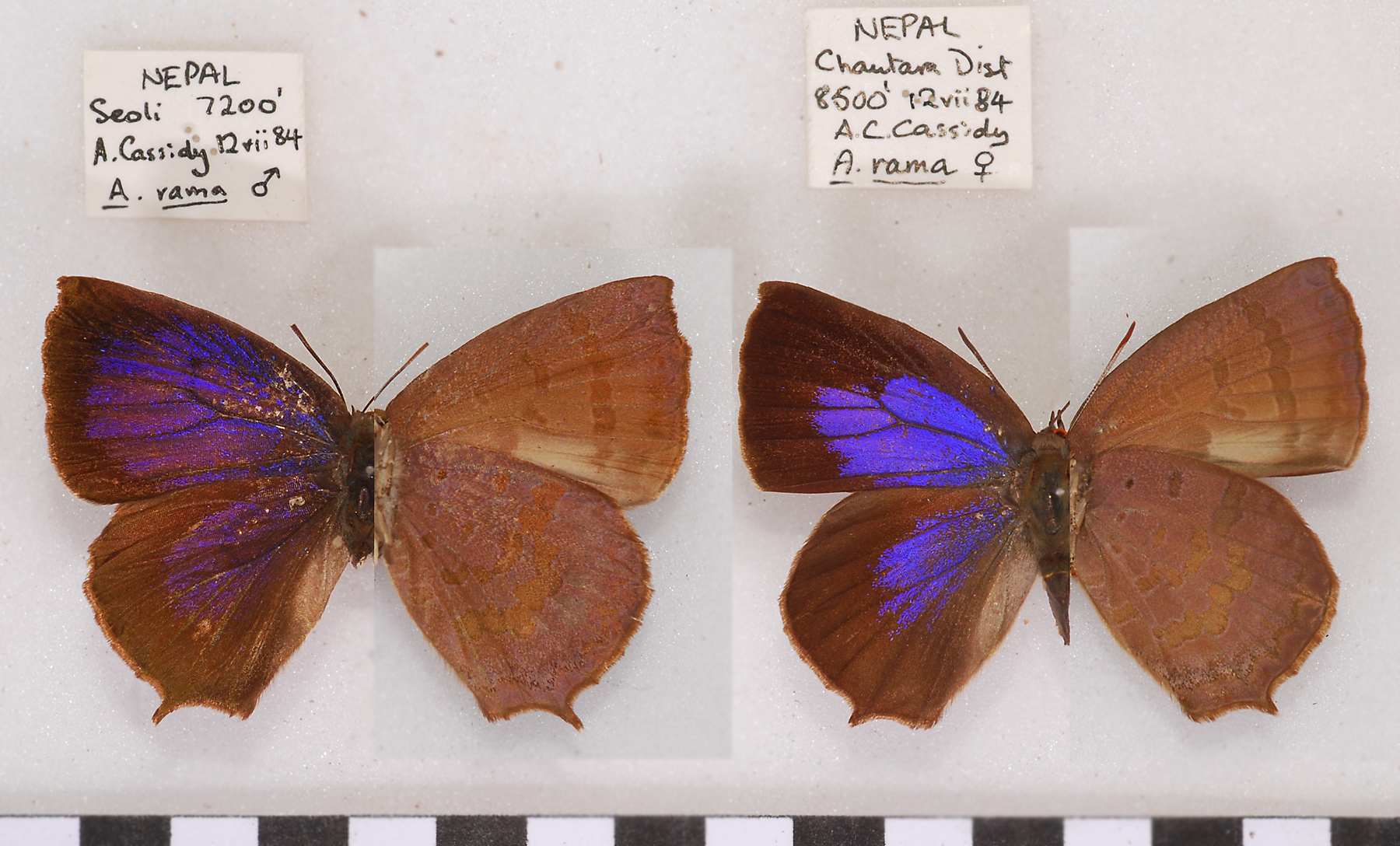
- Arhopala rama rama
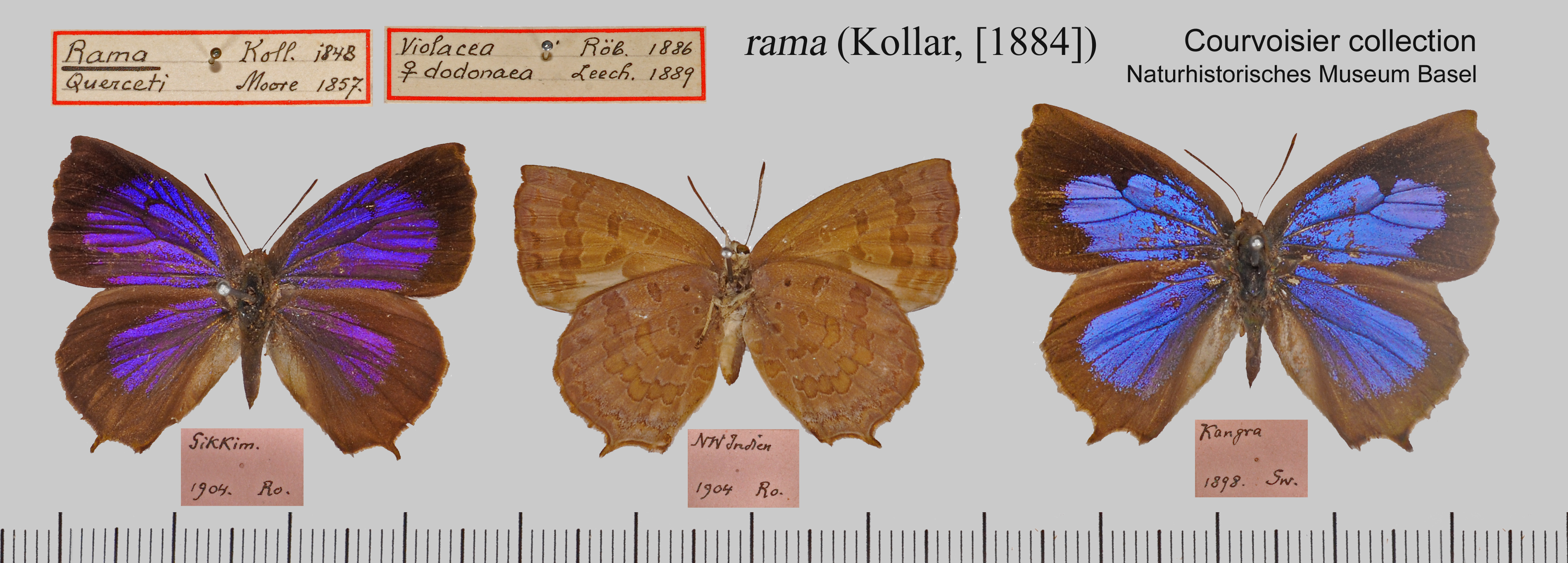
- Arhopala rama Courvoisier Collection, Basel

Scientific classification
- Kingdom: Animalia
- Phylum: Arthropoda
- Class: Insecta
- Order: Lepidoptera
- Family: Lycaenidae
- Genus: Arhopala
- Species: A. rama

Binomial name
- Arhopala rama Kollar, 1844

Synonyms
- Amblypodia rama (Kollar, 1848)

= Arhopala rama =

Dark Himalayan oakblue

Species of butterfly

Arhopala rama, the dark Himalayan oakblue, (sometimes placed in Amblypodia) is a small butterfly found in India, Indochina, China and Japan that belongs to the lycaenids or blues family.

== Description ==
Deep dark blue, with a very broad margin; hindwing with a minute tail.

== Range in India ==
The butterfly occurs in the Indian Himalayas from Kashmir to Sikkim and from Manipur to Dawnas.

== Status ==
The species is common in the Himalayas, but not rare elsewhere.

== See also ==
- List of butterflies of India (Lycaenidae)
