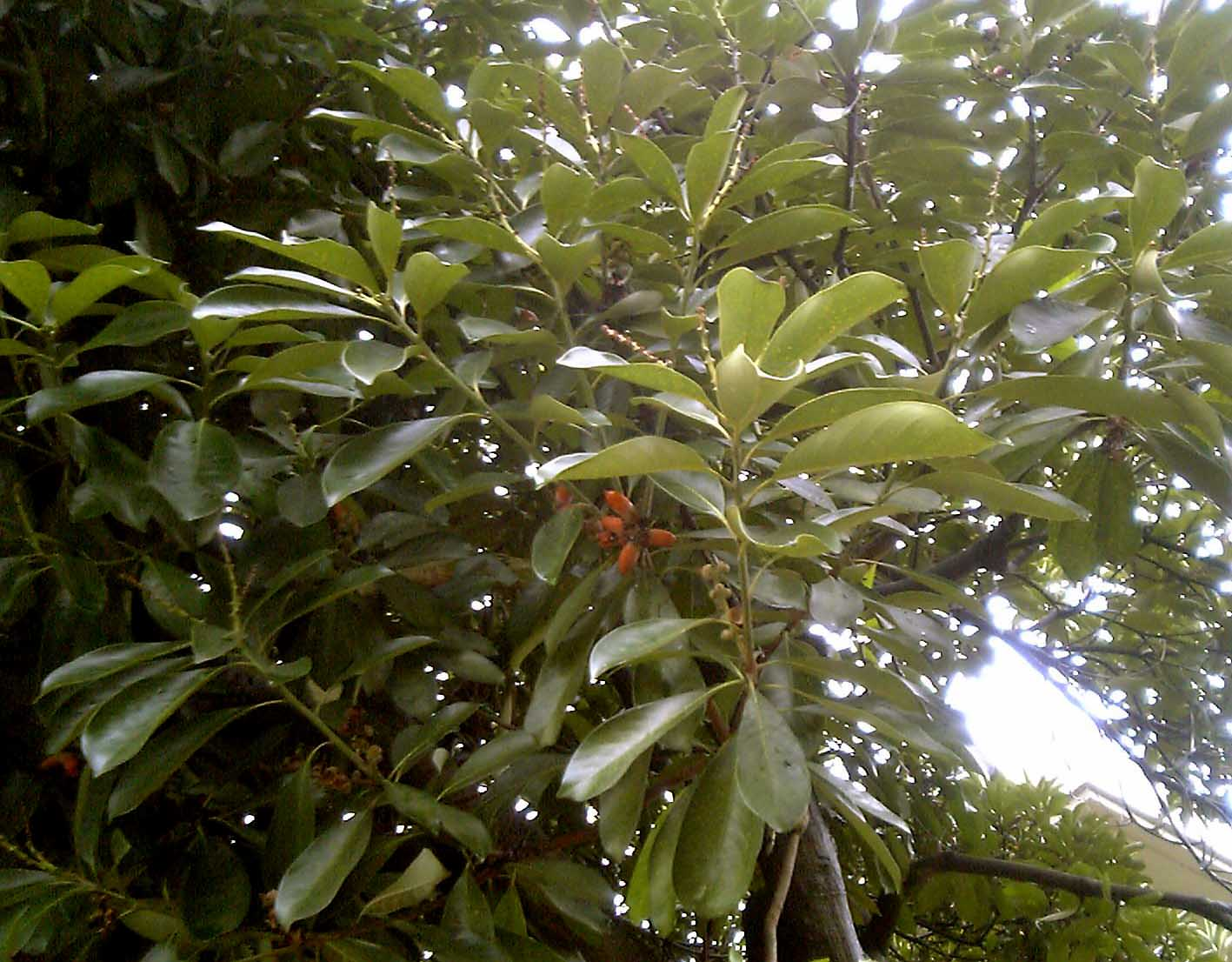
- Lithocarpus edulis, Kantō region, Japan

Conservation status
- Least Concern (IUCN 3.1)

Scientific classification
- Kingdom: Plantae
- Clade: Tracheophytes
- Clade: Angiosperms
- Clade: Eudicots
- Clade: Rosids
- Order: Fagales
- Family: Fagaceae
- Genus: Lithocarpus
- Species: L. edulis

Binomial name
- Lithocarpus edulis (Makino) Nakai

Synonyms
- Homotypic Synonyms: Pasania edulis (Makino) Makino; Quercus edulis Makino; Quercus glabra Siebold & Zucc.; Synaedrys edulis (Makino) Koidz.; Heterotypic Synonyms: Lithocarpus sublepidotus (Blume) Koidz.; Quercus glabra var. micrococca Blume; Quercus glabra var. sublepidota Blume

= Lithocarpus edulis =

Japanese stone oak

Species of tree

Lithocarpus edulis is a species of flowering plant in the family Fagaceae. It is sometimes referred to by the common name Japanese stone oak and is native to Japan and the Ryukyu Islands. It is an evergreen tree growing up to 15 metres tall. The nuts are edible for people but taste bitter. The nuts contain tannins, however soaking them in water removes them. It is cultivated as an ornamental plant.
