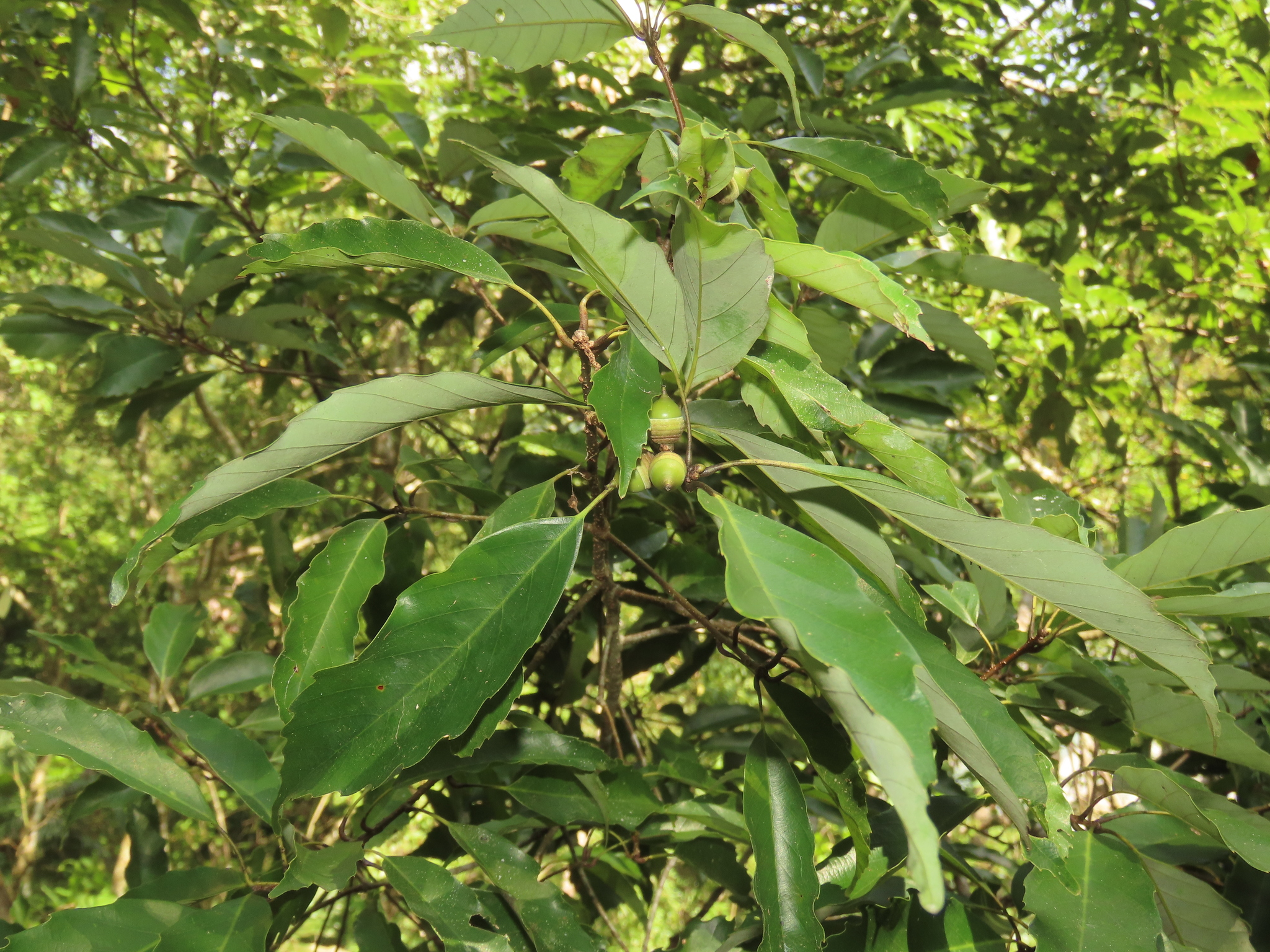

Conservation status
- Least Concern (IUCN 3.1)

Scientific classification
- Kingdom: Plantae
- Clade: Tracheophytes
- Clade: Angiosperms
- Clade: Eudicots
- Clade: Rosids
- Order: Fagales
- Family: Fagaceae
- Genus: Quercus
- Subgenus: Quercus subg. Cerris
- Section: Quercus sect. Cyclobalanopsis
- Species: Q. glauca

Binomial name
- Quercus glauca Thunb. 1784 not F. Buerger ex Blume 1851 nor Martrin-Donos & Timb.-Lagr. 1864 nor Bosc ex Loisel. 1825 nor Oerst. 1869

Synonyms
- List: Cyclobalanopsis amamiana (Hatus.) Masam.; Cyclobalanopsis glauca (Thunb.) Oerst.; Cyclobalanopsis glauca var. elongata (Honda) Sugim.; Cyclobalanopsis glauca var. kuyuensis (J.C.Liao) J.C.Liao; Cyclobalanopsis glauca var. lacera (Blume) Sugim.; Cyclobalanopsis glauca f. latifolia (Nakai) Hiyama ex Sugim.; Cyclobalanopsis glauca var. latifolia Nakai; Cyclobalanopsis glauca var. linearifolia (Koidz.) Sugim.; Cyclobalanopsis glauca var. stricta (Makino) Sugim.; Cyclobalanopsis sasakii (Kaneh.) Kudô & Masam.; Cyclobalanopsis vibrayana (Franch. & Sav.) Schottky; Perytis glauca (Thunb.) Raf.; Quercus acuta var. bambusifolia G.Nicholson; Quercus amamiana Hatus.; Quercus blakei var. vaniotii (H.Lév.) Chun; Quercus dentosa Lindl. ex Wall. name published without description; Quercus glauca var. amamiana (Hatus.) Hatus. ex H.Ohba; Quercus glauca var. caesia Blume; Quercus glauca var. elongata Honda; Quercus glauca subsp. euglauca A.Camus; Quercus glauca var. kuyuensis J.C.Liao; Quercus glauca f. lacera (Blume) Kitam.; Quercus glauca var. lacera (Blume) Matsum.; Quercus glauca var. linearifolia Koidz.; Quercus glauca var. micrococca Maxim. ex Franch. & Sav.; Quercus glauca f. nudata (Blume) M.Kim; Quercus glauca var. nudata Blume; Quercus glauca var. podocupula C.F.Shen; Quercus glauca var. stricta Makino; Quercus glauca var. villosa Skan; Quercus ichangensis Nakai ex A.Camus; Quercus lacera Blume; Quercus laxiflora Lindl. ex Wall. name published without description; Quercus longipes Hu 1951, not Steven 1857; Quercus lotungensis Chun & W.C.Ko; Quercus matasii Siebold; Quercus sasakii Kaneh.; Quercus tranninhensis Hickel & A.Camus; Quercus vaniotii H.Lév.; Quercus vibrayeana Franch. & Sav.

= Quercus glauca =

Ring-cupped oak

Species of oak tree

Quercus glauca (syn. Cyclobalanopsis glauca), commonly called ring-cupped oak or Japanese blue oak, is a tree in the beech family (Fagaceae). It is native to eastern and southern Asia, where it is found in Afghanistan, Bhutan, China, northern and eastern India, southern Japan, Kashmir, Korea, Myanmar, Nepal, Taiwan, and Vietnam. It is placed in subgenus Cerris, section Cyclobalanopsis.

== Description ==
Quercus glauca is a small to medium-sized evergreen broadleaf tree growing to 15–20 m tall. The leaves are a distinct deep purple-crimson on new growth, soon turning glossy green above, glaucous blue-green below, 60–13 mm long and 20–50 mm broad, with a serrated margin. The flowers are catkins, and the fruit are acorns 1–1.6 cm long, with series of concentric rings on the outside of the acorn cup (it is in the "ring-cupped oak" sub-genus).

== Cultivation and uses ==
It is planted as an ornamental tree in regions of Europe and North America with mild winters.

Its acorns are edible. When dried and ground into powder they can be mixed with cereals and used as flour. The roasted seeds can be used as a coffee substitute. The wood of Quercus glauca is a valuable fuelwood. Its leaves and stems are relished by deer.

== Gallery ==
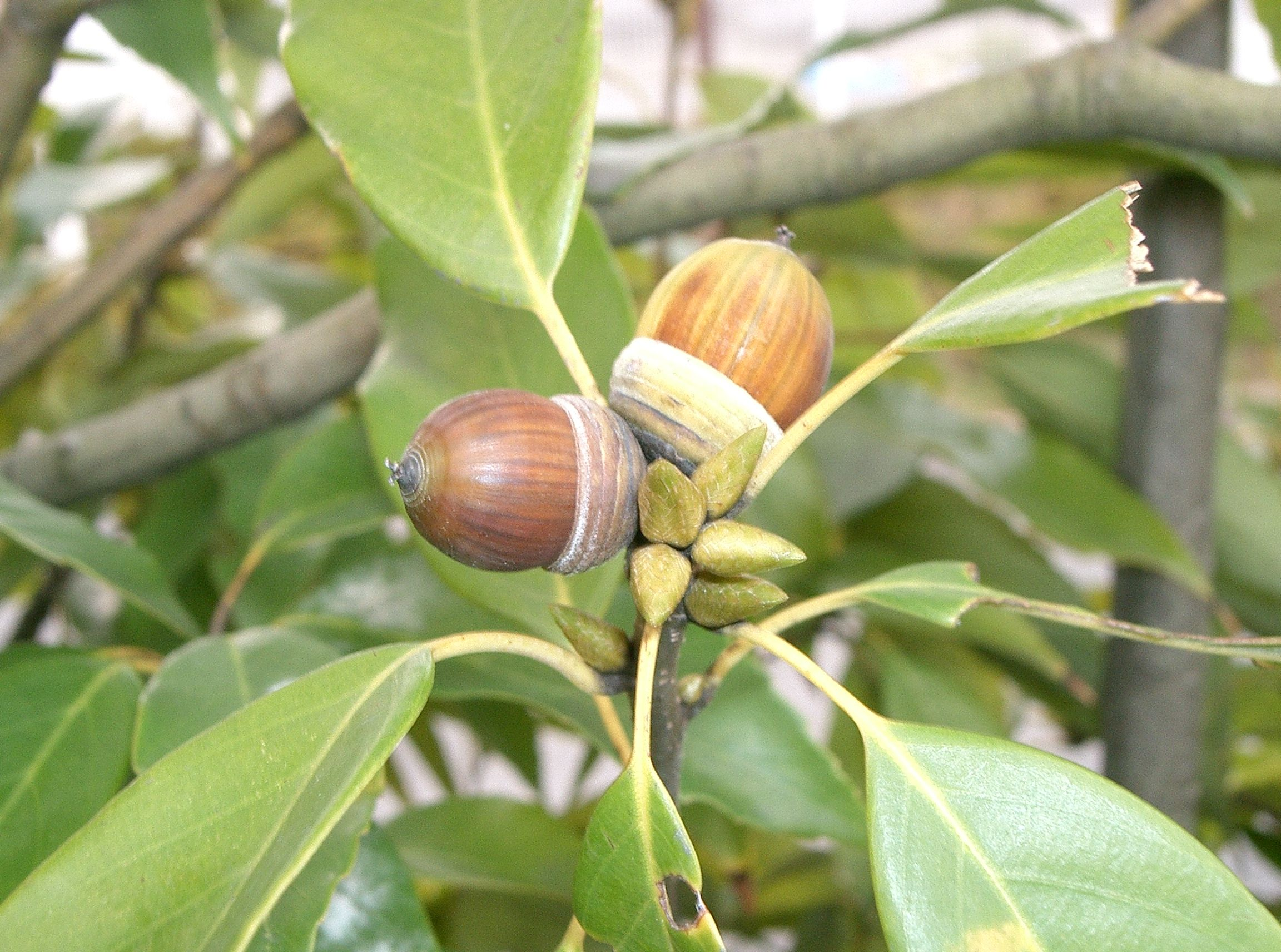
Detail of acorns and buds

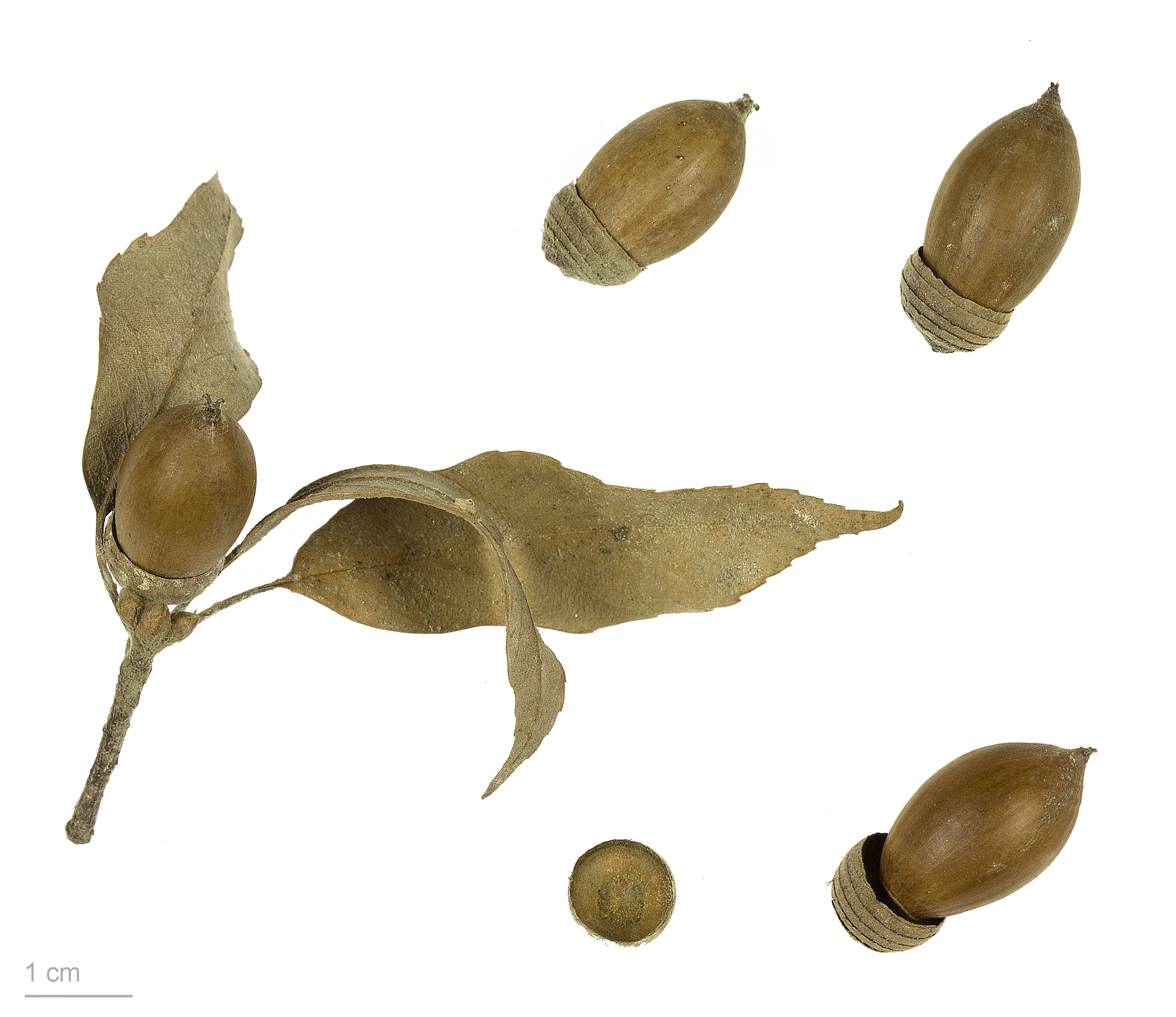
Dried leaves and acorns
