= Ochraceum =

Ochraceum may refer to:

- Amphimallon ochraceum, species of beetle
- Cosmisoma ochraceum, species of beetle
- Haliangium ochraceum, species of bacteria
- Rhododendron ochraceum, species of plant
- Steccherinum ochraceum, species of fungus
- Tropidion ochraceum, species of beetle
- Vexillum ochraceum, species of sea snail
- Virgisporangium ochraceum, species of bacteria
