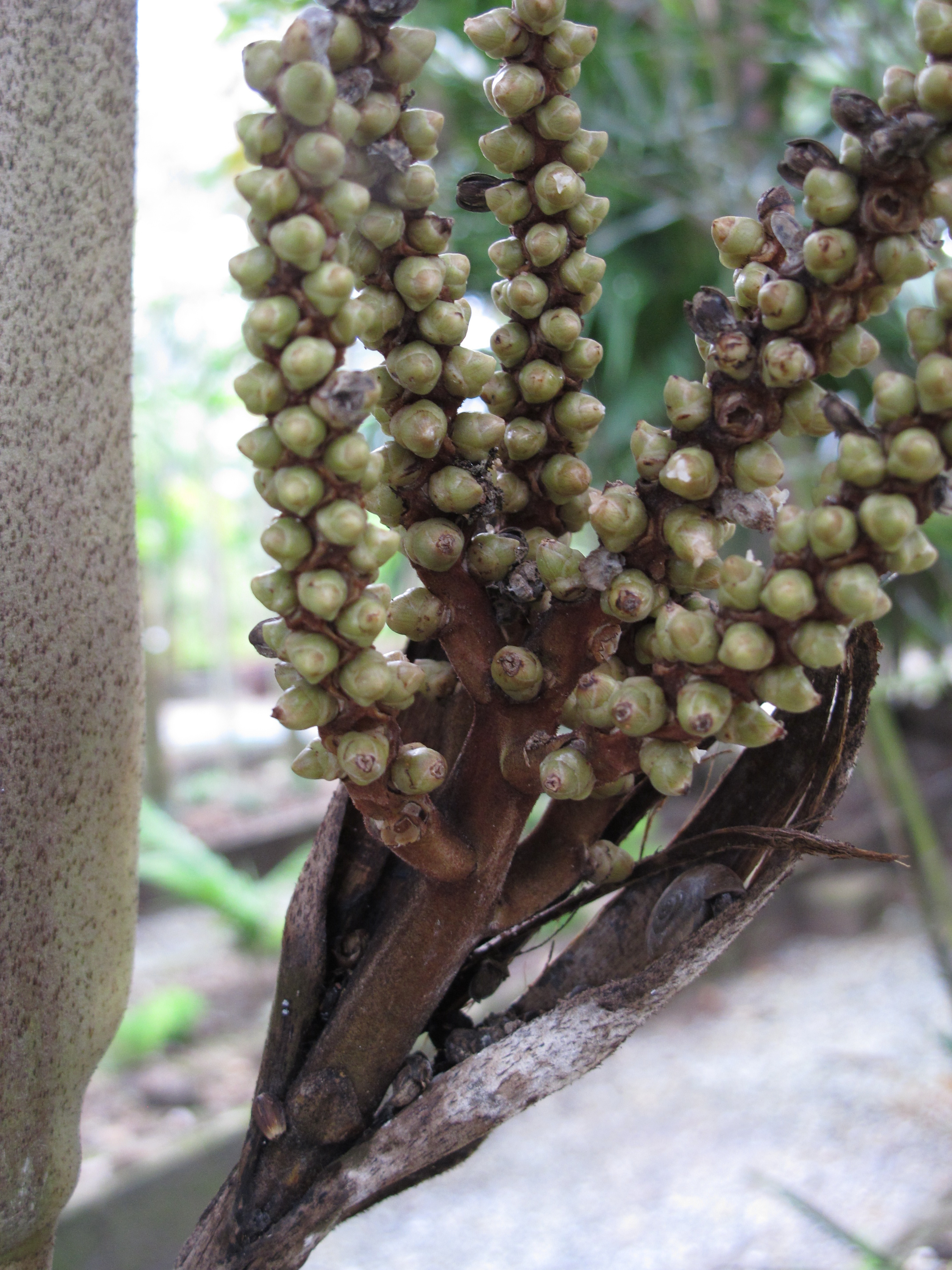
- Drymophloeus oliviformis

Scientific classification
- Kingdom: Plantae
- Clade: Tracheophytes
- Clade: Angiosperms
- Clade: Monocots
- Clade: Commelinids
- Order: Arecales
- Family: Arecaceae
- Subfamily: Arecoideae
- Tribe: Areceae
- Subtribe: Ptychospermatinae
- Genus: Drymophloeus; Zipp.

Synonyms
- Coleospadix Becc.; Saguaster Kuntze; Rehderophoenix Burret

= Drymophloeus =

Genus of palms

Drymophloeus is a genus of flowering plant in the family Arecaceae. It is native to New Guinea and nearby islands in Samoa and Maluku.

It contains the following species:

- Drymophloeus litigiosus (Becc.) H.E.Moore - New Guinea, Maluku
- Drymophloeus oliviformis (Giseke) Mart. - New Guinea, Maluku
- Drymophloeus whitmeeanus Becc. - Samoa

formerly included

- Drymophloeus lepidotus H.E.Moore = Veitchia lepidota (H.E.Moore) C.Lewis & Zona - Solomon Islands
- Drymophloeus subdistichus (H.E.Moore) H.E.Moore = Veitchia subdisticha (H.E.Moore) C.Lewis & Zona - Solomon Islands
