= Alfred Rehder =

German-American botanical taxonomist and dendrologist

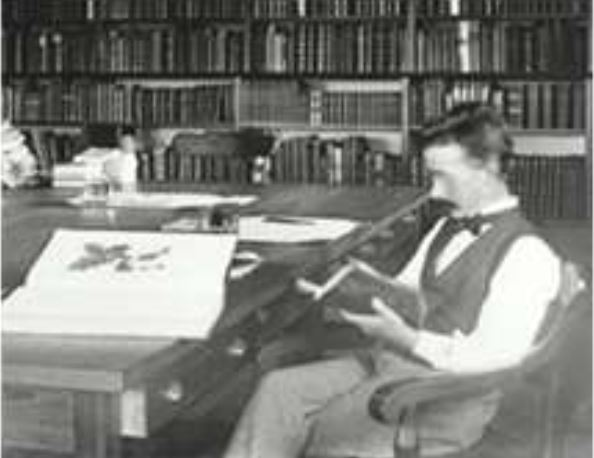
- Rehder in the Arnold Arboretum library in 1898, shortly after his arrival in the U.S.
- Born: 4 September 1863; Waldenburg, Saxony
- Died: 25 July 1949 (aged 85); Boston
- Scientific career
- Fields: Botany
- Workplaces: Berlin Botanical Garden; Brocken Garden; Darmstadt Botanical Garden
- Author abbrev. (botany): Rehder

Alfred Rehder (4 September 1863 in Waldenburg, Saxony – 25 July 1949 in Jamaica Plain, Massachusetts) was a German-American botanical taxonomist and dendrologist who worked at the Arnold Arboretum of Harvard University. He is generally regarded as the foremost dendrologist of his generation.

== Life ==
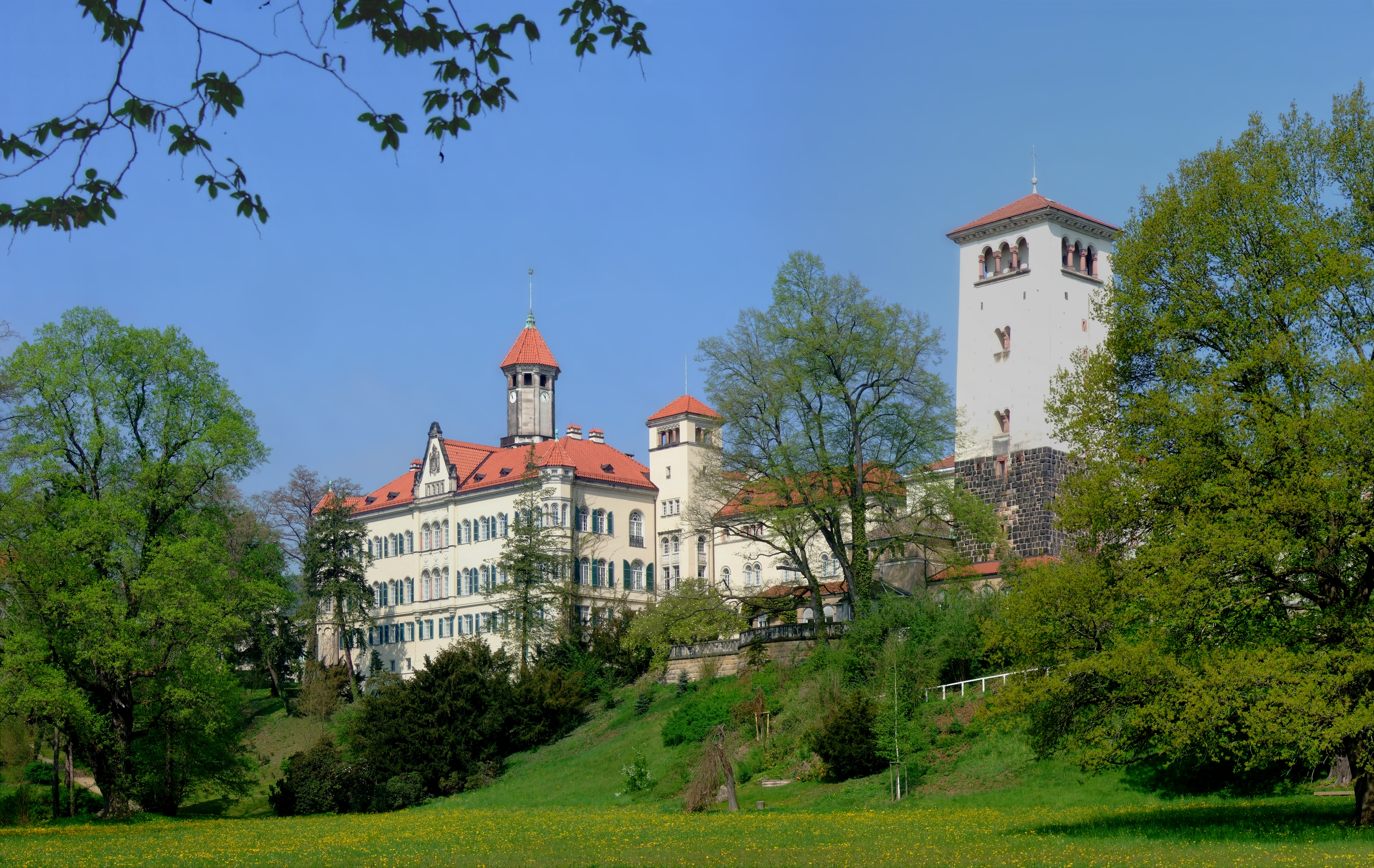
Rehder's birthplace, Waldenburg Castle

Georg Alfred Rehder was born in the castle of Waldenburg to Thekla née Schmidt (1839–1897) and Paul Julius Rehder (1833–1917), the superintendent of parks and gardens of the principality of Schönburg-Waldenburg. Through his father, Rehder was introduced to the gardening profession. On his mother's side of the family, Rehder was likely descended from Henry, Duke of Anhalt-Köthen (1778–1847).

Rehder broke off his attendance at the gymnasium in Zwickau in 1881 and did not pursue university studies, instead working for three years as an apprentice under the tutelage of his father. His professional career began in 1884 at the Berlin Botanical Garden. Here he was able to attend lectures by Paul Friedrich August Ascherson and August Wilhelm Eichler, among others. In 1886, he went to work for a florist in Frankfurt am Main, and half a year later he moved to the Muskau Park. Here he first met the daughter of the local parks superintendent, Anneliese Hedwig Schrefeld (1875–1967), whom he married in 1906.

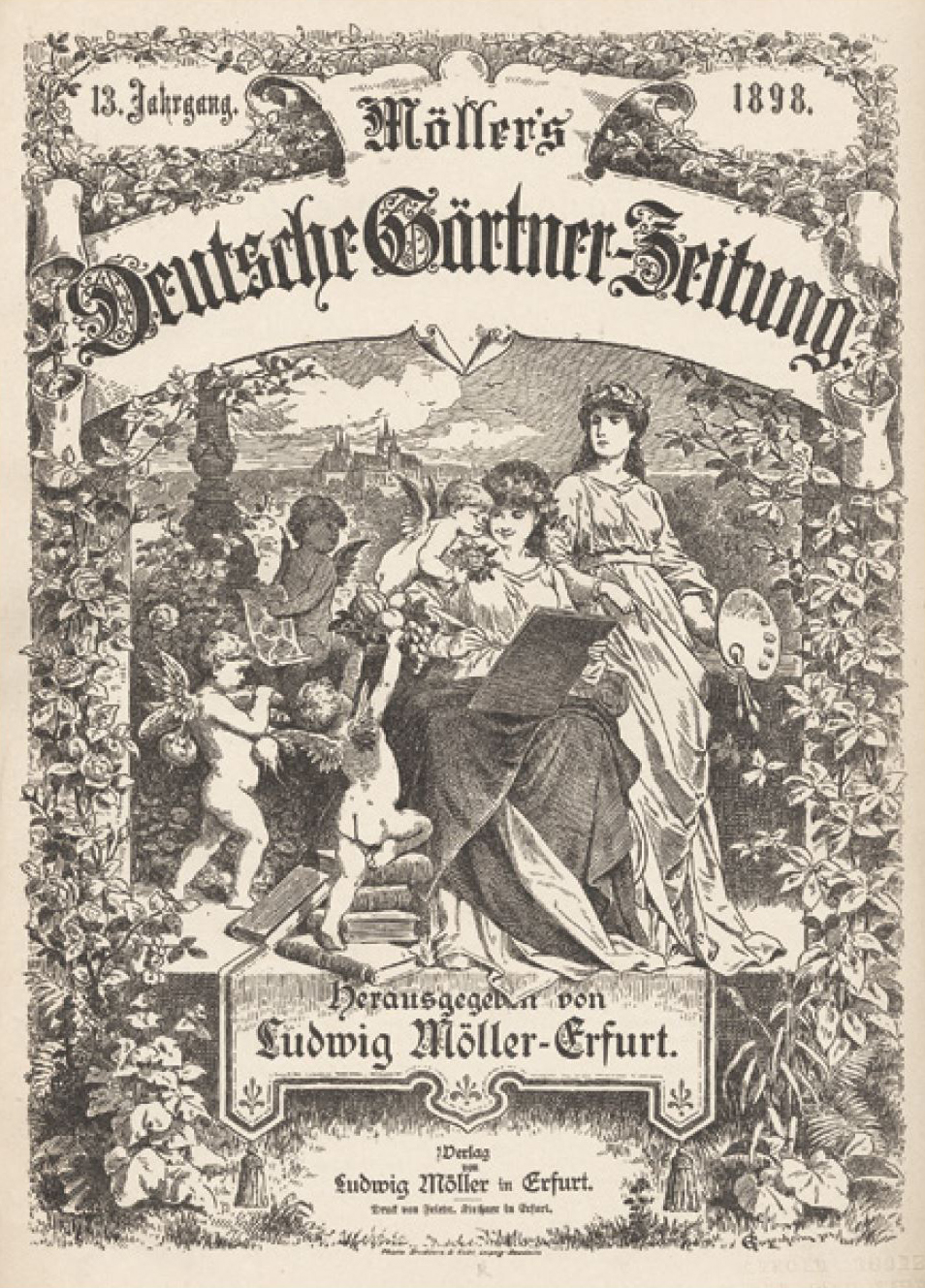
Möller's Deutsche Gärtner-Zeitung (1898)

In 1888, Rehder accepted an appointment as head gardener at the Darmstadt Botanical Garden. He moved next to the Göttingen Botanical Garden, where he was head gardener from 1889 to 1895. During this time, he was involved in the creation of the Brocken Garden for Alpine plants, initiated by Albert Peter in 1890 on the highest mountain of the Harz range. In addition, he became a contributing editor of several professional periodicals. In 1895, he was appointed associate editor of Möller's Deutsche Gärtner-Zeitung (published in Erfurt), Germany's premier horticultural journal, for which he wrote numerous articles.

In 1898, he was assigned by the Deutsche Gärtner-Zeitung to travel to the United States and study woody plants and orchards. The German government also asked him to research American grape species, known to be resistant to the grape phylloxera that were threatening to infest German vineyards and destroy the wine industry. He undertook research at the Arnold Arboretum, and here he came to the attention of the director, Charles Sprague Sargent, who quickly recognized Rehder's abilities and persuaded him to stay at the arboretum and work on the comprehensive study of woody plants eventually published as The Bradley Bibliography (5 vols., 1911–18). At about this time, he was also introduced to Liberty Hyde Bailey of Cornell University, who asked him to prepare the text on woody genera for the Cyclopedia of American Horticulture (4 vols., 1900–02).

Rehder was naturalized as an American citizen in 1904, but he maintained his ties with Germany. During World War I, he was subject to surveillance by the Bureau of Investigation.

Collaborating closely with Charles Sprague Sargent, Rehder launched the Journal of the Arnold Arboretum, which appeared as a quarterly from 1919 to 1990. The journal had a particular focus on dendrology but also covered other botanical fields. He was instrumental in systematizing the thousands of plants collected by Ernest Henry Wilson in China.

Rehder created the first system of isothermic zones for the United States that related average winter minimum temperatures to the hardiness of specific plants. The system, along with another developed by Wladimir Köppen, is the basis for the USDA Hardiness zone maps in use today.

In 1913, Harvard conferred upon him an honorary Master of Arts degree. In 1914, he was inducted into the American Academy of Arts and Sciences. From 1918 to 1940, he served as the herbarium curator of the Arnold Arboretum. In 1934, he was appointed to an associate professorship in dendrology at Harvard University. This position was extraordinary not just because Rehder had never enrolled at a university, but also because he never taught a course due to a speech impediment.

More than 60 plant taxa have been named in honor of Rehder, and the genera Rehdera (family Verbenaceae, 1935), Rehderodendron (family Styracaceae, 1932), and Rehderophoenix (now a synonym of Drymophloeus), were all named after him.

== Works ==
Rehder's œuvre comprises about 1,000 publications. His most well-known work is the Manual of Cultivated Trees and Shrubs, Hardy in North America (1927), which became a virtual "bible of the dendrologist". His most comprehensive work, however, is the Bibliography of Cultivated Trees and Shrubs Hardy in Cooler Temperate Regions of the Northern Hemisphere (1949), truly a mammoth work that brings together 150,000 individual data compiled over decades.

Rehder also produced The Bradley Bibliography: A Guide to the Literature of the Woody Plants of the World Published Before the Beginning of the Twentieth Century (5 vols., 1911–18). He was co-author, with Ernest Henry Wilson, of Plantae Wilsonianae: An Enumeration of the Woody Plants Collected in Western China for the Arnold Arboretum of Harvard University During the Years 1907, 1908, and 1910 (3 vols., 1913, 1916–17) and A Monograph of Azaleas: Rhododendron subgenus Anthodendron (1921). Finally, he authored Synopsis of the Genus Lonicera (1903).
