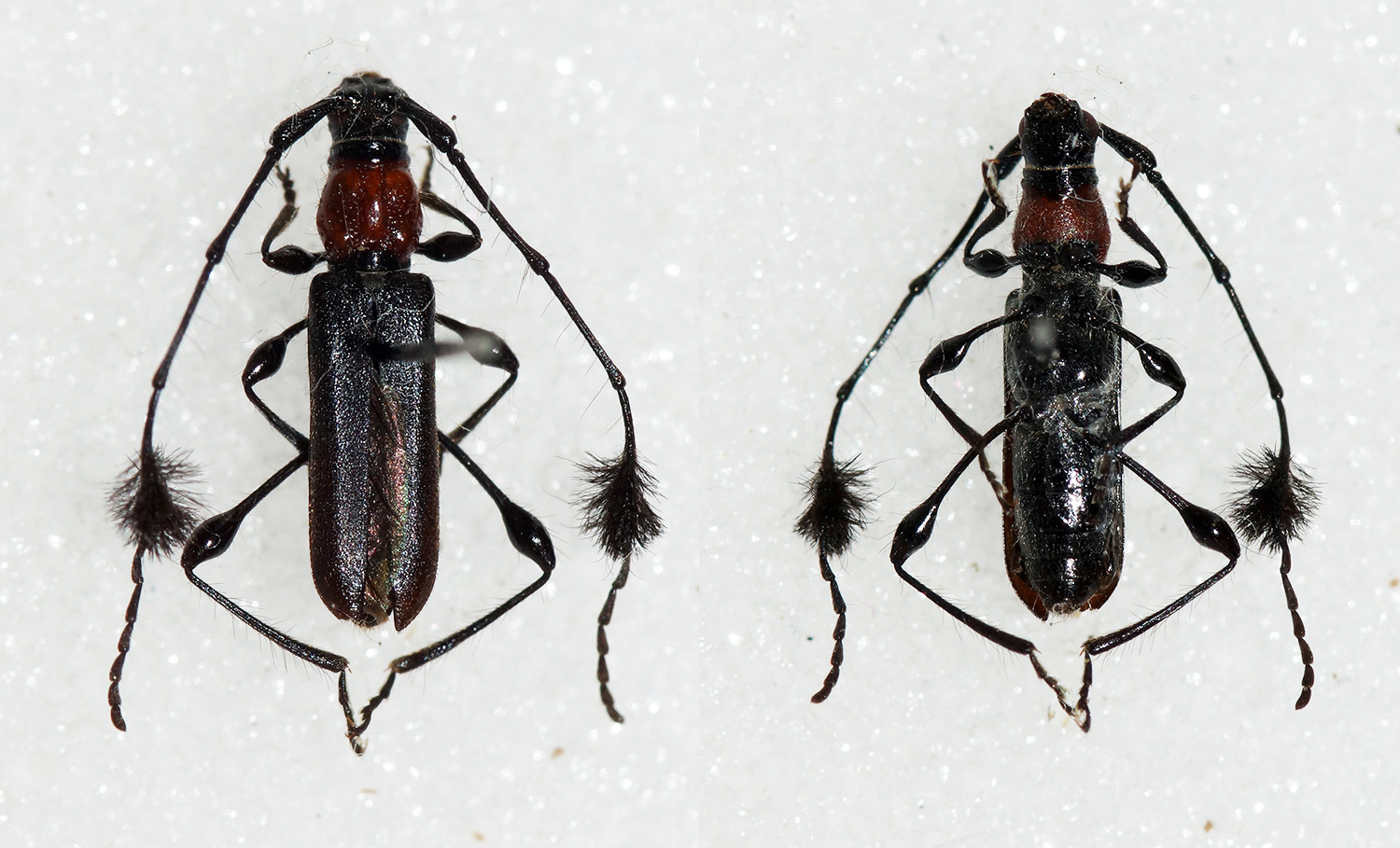

Scientific classification
- Domain: Eukaryota
- Kingdom: Animalia
- Phylum: Arthropoda
- Class: Insecta
- Order: Coleoptera
- Suborder: Polyphaga
- Infraorder: Cucujiformia
- Family: Cerambycidae
- Genus: Cosmisoma
- Species: C. brullei

Binomial name
- Cosmisoma brullei (Mulsant, 1863)

= Cosmisoma brullei =

Species of beetle

Cosmisoma brullei is a species of beetle in the family Cerambycidae. It was described by Mulsant in 1863.
