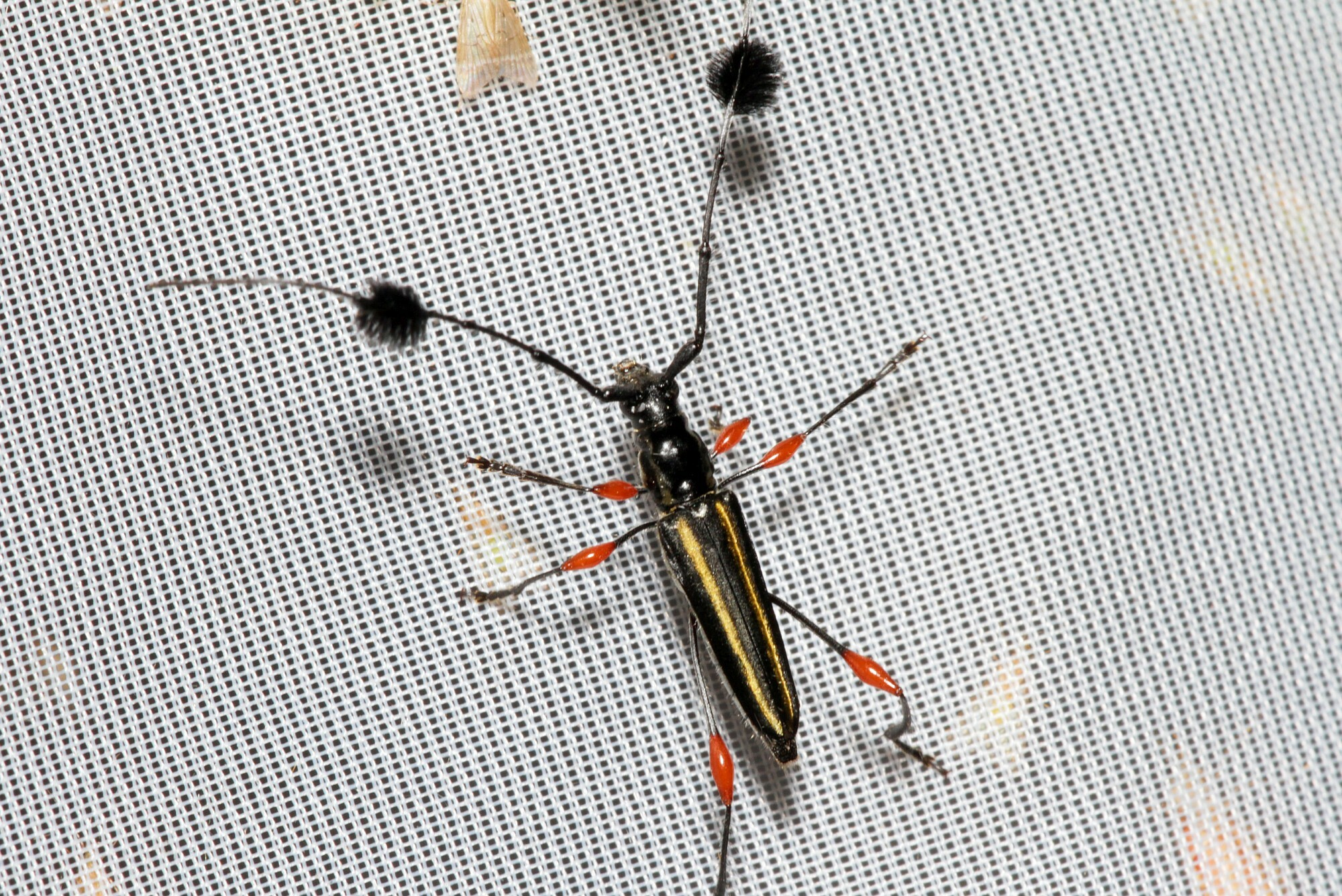

Scientific classification
- Domain: Eukaryota
- Kingdom: Animalia
- Phylum: Arthropoda
- Class: Insecta
- Order: Coleoptera
- Suborder: Polyphaga
- Infraorder: Cucujiformia
- Family: Cerambycidae
- Genus: Cosmisoma
- Species: C. lineatum

Binomial name
- Cosmisoma lineatum (Kirsch, 1875)

= Cosmisoma lineatum =

Species of beetle

Cosmisoma lineatum is a species of beetle in the family Cerambycidae. It was described by Theodor Franz Wilhelm Kirsch in 1875.
