= Cosmisoma albohirsutotibialis =

Scientific classification
- Domain: Eukaryota
- Kingdom: Animalia
- Phylum: Arthropoda
- Class: Insecta
- Order: Coleoptera
- Suborder: Polyphaga
- Infraorder: Cucujiformia
- Family: Cerambycidae
- Genus: Cosmisoma
- Species: C. albohirsutotibialis

Binomial name
- Cosmisoma albohirsutotibialis E. Fuchs, 1966

Species of beetle

Cosmisoma albohirsutotibialis is a species of beetle in the family Cerambycidae. It was described by Ernst Fuchs in 1966.
