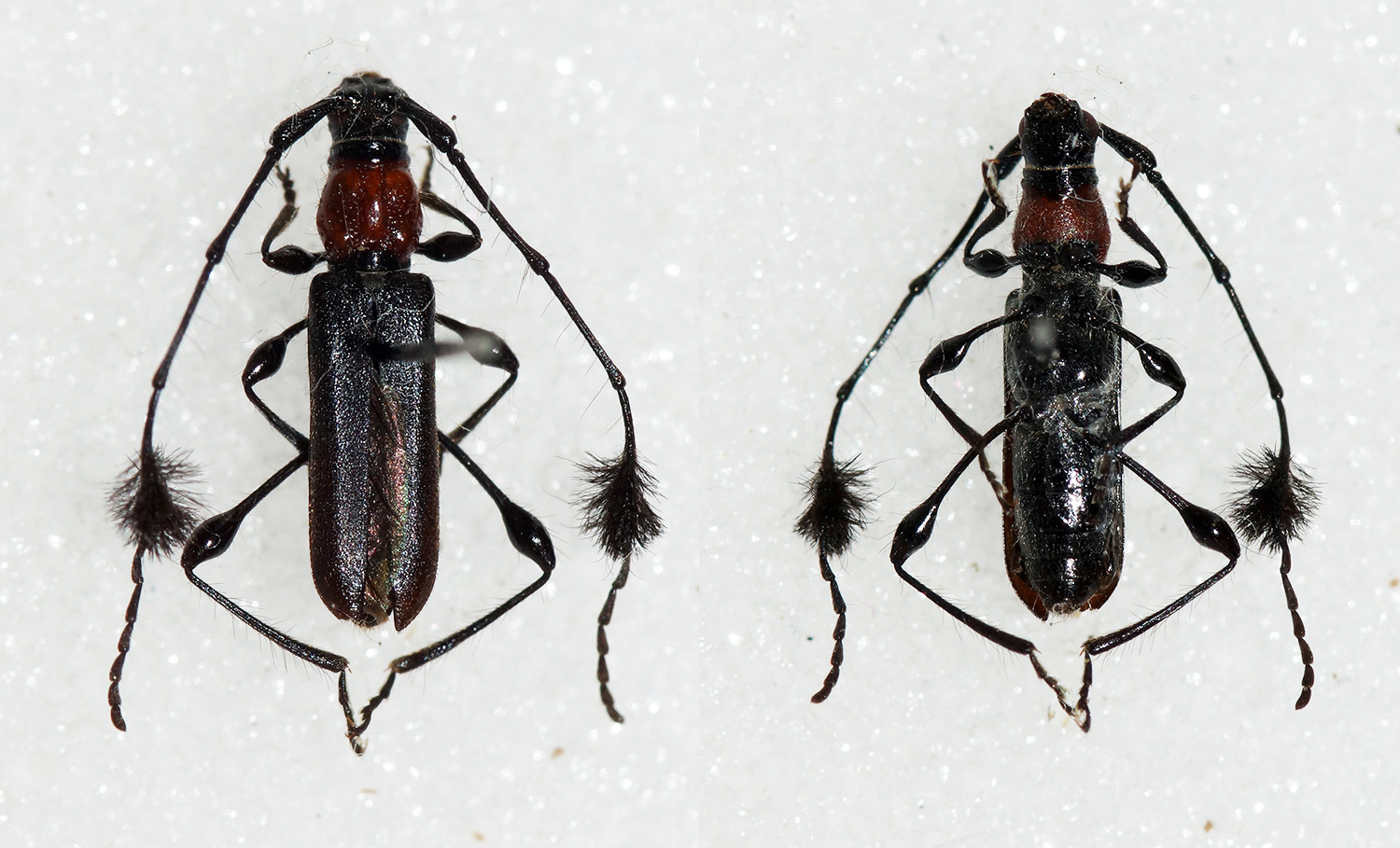
- Cosmisoma brullei

Scientific classification
- Domain: Eukaryota
- Kingdom: Animalia
- Phylum: Arthropoda
- Class: Insecta
- Order: Coleoptera
- Suborder: Polyphaga
- Infraorder: Cucujiformia
- Family: Cerambycidae
- Subfamily: Cerambycinae
- Tribe: Rhopalophorini
- Genus: Cosmisoma; Audinet-Serville, 1834

= Cosmisoma =

Genus of beetles

Cosmisoma is a genus of beetles in the family Cerambycidae, containing the following species:

- Cosmisoma acuminatum Zajciw, 1958
- Cosmisoma aeneicollis Erichson in Schomburg, 1848
- Cosmisoma albohirsutotibialis Fuchs, 1966
- Cosmisoma ammiralis (Linnaeus, 1767)
- Cosmisoma angustipenne Zajciw, 1958
- Cosmisoma argyreum Bates, 1870
- Cosmisoma batesi Zajciw, 1962
- Cosmisoma brullei (Mulsant, 1863)
- Cosmisoma cambaia Monné & Magno, 1988
- Cosmisoma capixaba Monné & Magno, 1988
- Cosmisoma chalybeipenne Zajciw, 1962
- Cosmisoma compsoceroides Gounelle, 1911
- Cosmisoma cyaneum Gounelle, 1911
- Cosmisoma debile Monné & Magno, 1988
- Cosmisoma fasciculatum (Olivier, 1795)
- Cosmisoma flavipes Zajciw, 1962
- Cosmisoma gratum Monné & Magno, 1988
- Cosmisoma hirtipes Zajciw, 1962
- Cosmisoma humerale Bates, 1870
- Cosmisoma leucomelas Monné & Magno, 1988
- Cosmisoma lineatum (Kirsch, 1875)
- Cosmisoma lineellum Bates, 1870
- Cosmisoma lividum Monné & Magno, 1988
- Cosmisoma martyr Thomson, 1860
- Cosmisoma militaris Giesbert & Chemsak, 1993
- Cosmisoma nitidipenne Zajciw, 1962
- Cosmisoma ochraceum (Perty, 1832)
- Cosmisoma persimile Gounelle, 1911
- Cosmisoma plumicorne (Drury, 1782)
- Cosmisoma pulcherrimum Bates, 1870
- Cosmisoma reticulatum Bates, 1885
- Cosmisoma rhaptos Giesbert & Chemsak, 1993
- Cosmisoma scopipes (Klug, 1825)
- Cosmisoma scopulicorne (Kirby, 1818)
- Cosmisoma seabrai Monné & Magno, 1988
- Cosmisoma speculiferum (Gory in Guérin-Méneville, 1831)
- Cosmisoma taunayi Melzer, 1923
- Cosmisoma tenellum Aurivillius, 1920
- Cosmisoma tibiale Aurivillius, 1920
- Cosmisoma titania Bates, 1870
- Cosmisoma violaceum Zajciw, 1962
- Cosmisoma viridescens Galileo & Martins, 2010
