= Veitchia metiti =

Conservation status
- Conservation Dependent (IUCN 2.3)

Scientific classification
- Kingdom: Plantae
- Clade: Tracheophytes
- Clade: Angiosperms
- Clade: Monocots
- Clade: Commelinids
- Order: Arecales
- Family: Arecaceae
- Genus: Veitchia
- Species: V. metiti

Binomial name
- Veitchia metiti Becc.

Species of palm

Veitchia metiti is a species of flowering plant in the family Arecaceae. It is found only in Vanuatu, where it is native to the islands of Vanua Lava and Ureparapara.
