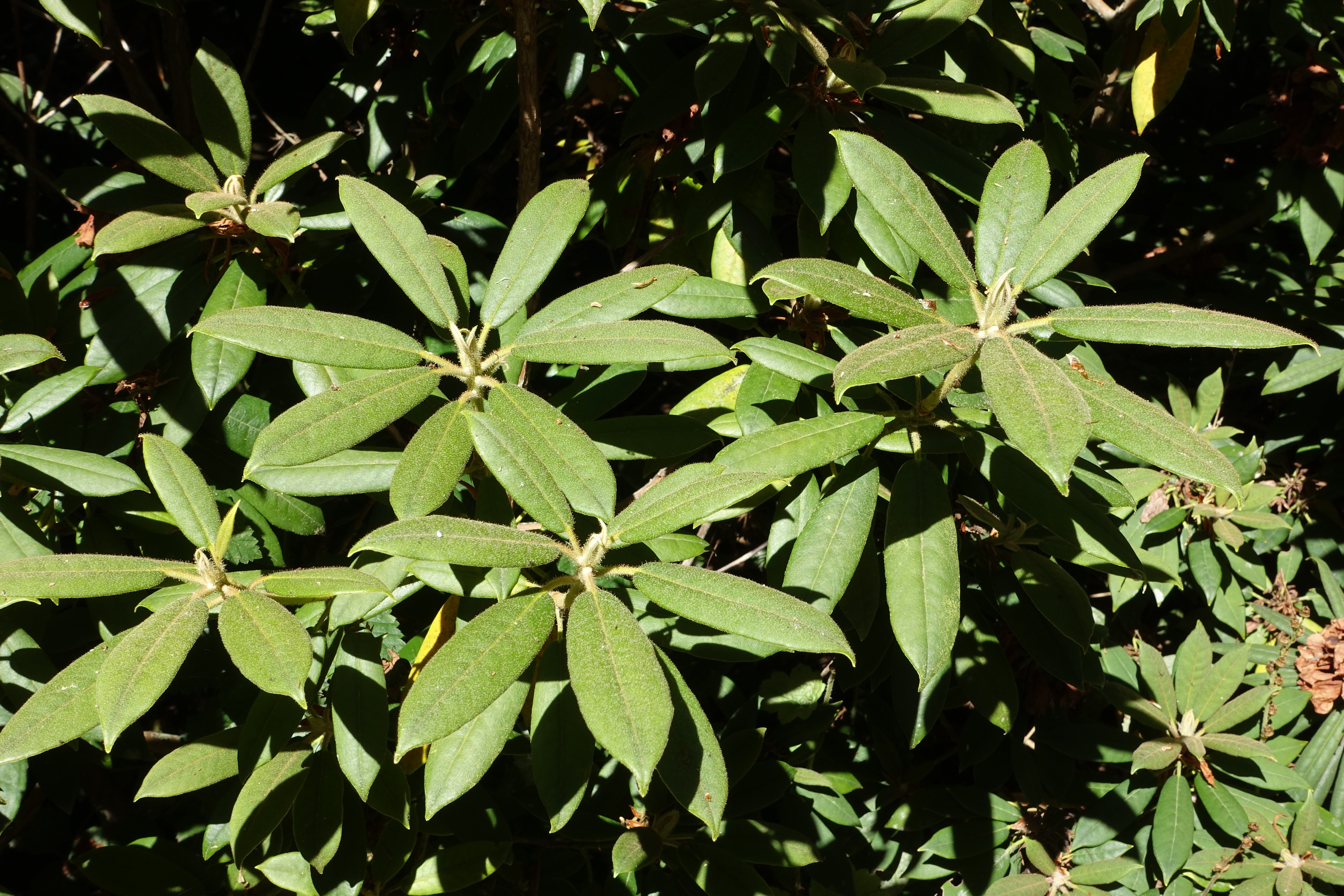

Scientific classification
- Kingdom: Plantae
- Clade: Tracheophytes
- Clade: Angiosperms
- Clade: Eudicots
- Clade: Asterids
- Order: Ericales
- Family: Ericaceae
- Genus: Rhododendron
- Species: R. ochraceum

Binomial name
- Rhododendron ochraceum Rehder & E.H.Wilson (1913)

= Rhododendron ochraceum =

Species of plant

Rhododendron ochraceum (峨马杜鹃) is a rhododendron species native to Chongqing (Nanchuan), southern Sichuan, and northeastern Yunnan, China, where it grows at elevations of 1,700–3,000 m (5,600–9,800 ft). It is an evergreen tree that typically grows to 2–6 m (6.6–19.7 ft) in height, with leaves that are oblanceolate and 5–8.5 × 1.2–2.5 cm in size. The flowers are crimson.

Two varieties are accepted:

- Rhododendron ochraceum var. brevicarpum W.K.Hu
- Rhododendron ochraceum var. ochraceum
