= Cosmisoma rhaptos =

Scientific classification
- Domain: Eukaryota
- Kingdom: Animalia
- Phylum: Arthropoda
- Class: Insecta
- Order: Coleoptera
- Suborder: Polyphaga
- Infraorder: Cucujiformia
- Family: Cerambycidae
- Genus: Cosmisoma
- Species: C. rhaptos

Binomial name
- Cosmisoma rhaptos Giesbert & Chemsak, 1993

Species of beetle

Cosmisoma rhaptos is a species of beetle in the family Cerambycidae. It was described by Giesbert & Chemsak in 1993.
