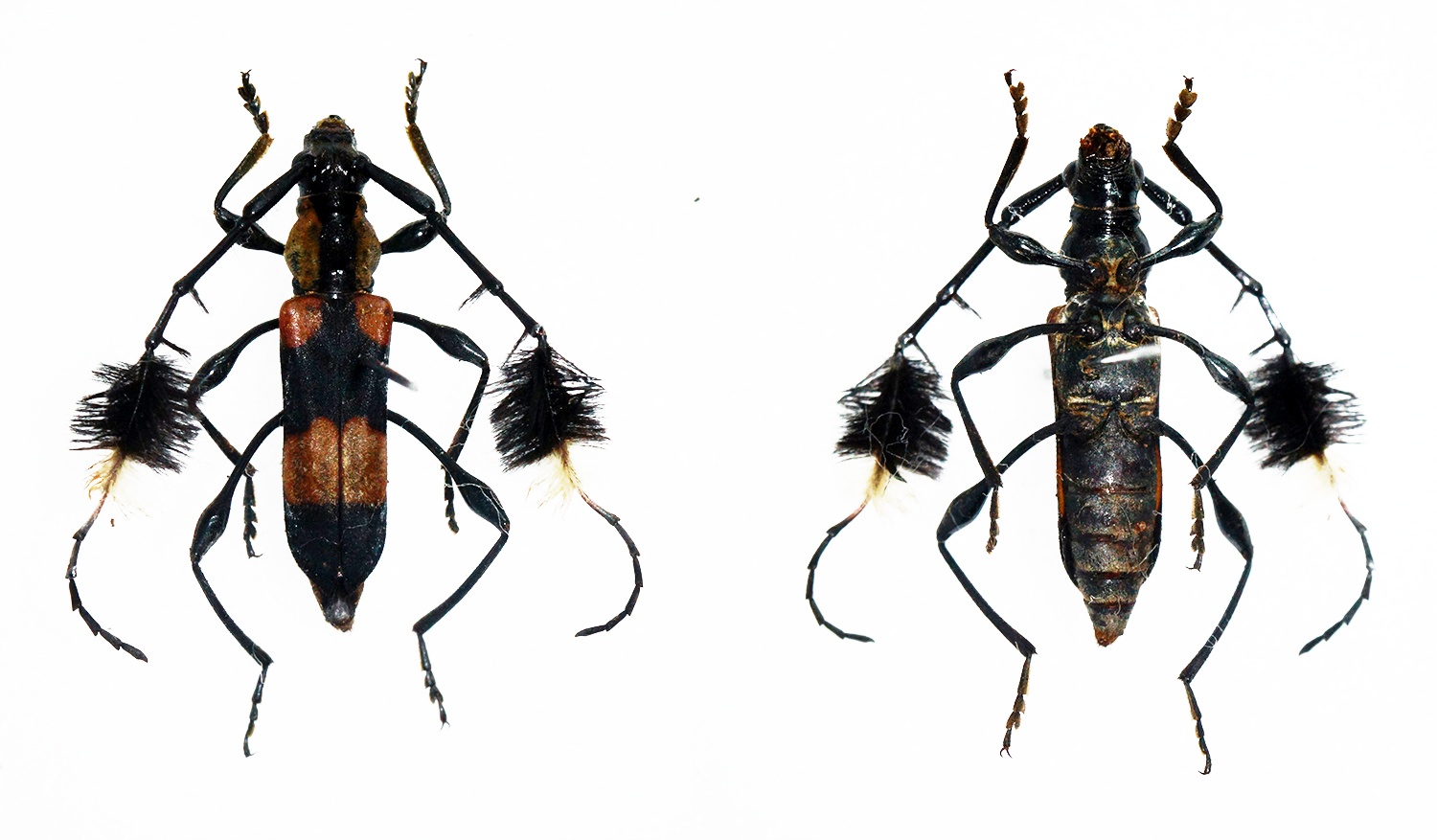

Scientific classification
- Kingdom: Animalia
- Phylum: Arthropoda
- Class: Insecta
- Order: Coleoptera
- Suborder: Polyphaga
- Infraorder: Cucujiformia
- Family: Cerambycidae
- Genus: Cosmisoma
- Species: C. ammiralis

Binomial name
- Cosmisoma ammiralis (Linnaeus, 1767)

= Cosmisoma ammiralis =

Species of beetle

Cosmisoma ammiralis is a species of beetle in the family Cerambycidae. It was described by Carl Linnaeus in his 1767 12th edition of Systema Naturae.
