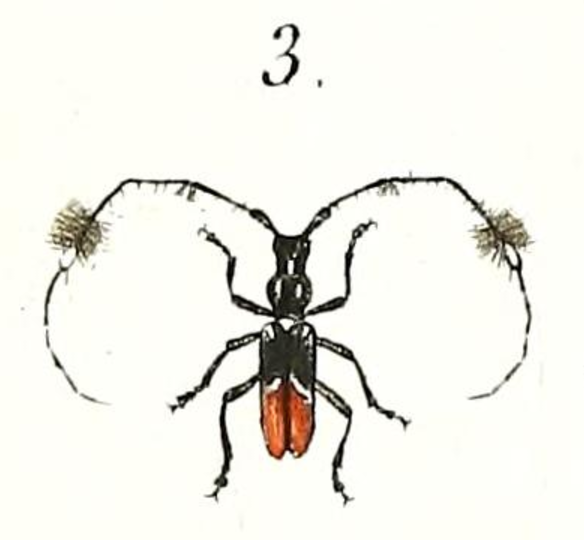
- Figure of C. fasciculatum from Olivier. Note this figure was described as "very bad" by H. W. Bates.

Scientific classification
- Kingdom: Animalia
- Phylum: Arthropoda
- Class: Insecta
- Order: Coleoptera
- Suborder: Polyphaga
- Infraorder: Cucujiformia
- Family: Cerambycidae
- Genus: Cosmisoma
- Species: C. fasciculatum

Binomial name
- Cosmisoma fasciculatum (Olivier, 1795)

Synonyms
- Saperda fasciculata Oliver, 1795

= Cosmisoma fasciculatum =

Species of beetle

Cosmisoma fasciculatum is a species of beetle in the family Cerambycidae. It was described by Guillaume-Antoine Olivier in 1795 and can be found in French Guiana and north central Brasil.
