= Veitchia winin =

Scientific classification
- Kingdom: Plantae
- Clade: Tracheophytes
- Clade: Angiosperms
- Clade: Monocots
- Clade: Commelinids
- Order: Arecales
- Family: Arecaceae
- Genus: Veitchia
- Species: V. winin

Binomial name
- Veitchia winin H.E.Moore

Species of palm

Veitchia winin is a species of flowering plant in the family Arecaceae. It is endemic to Vanuatu.
