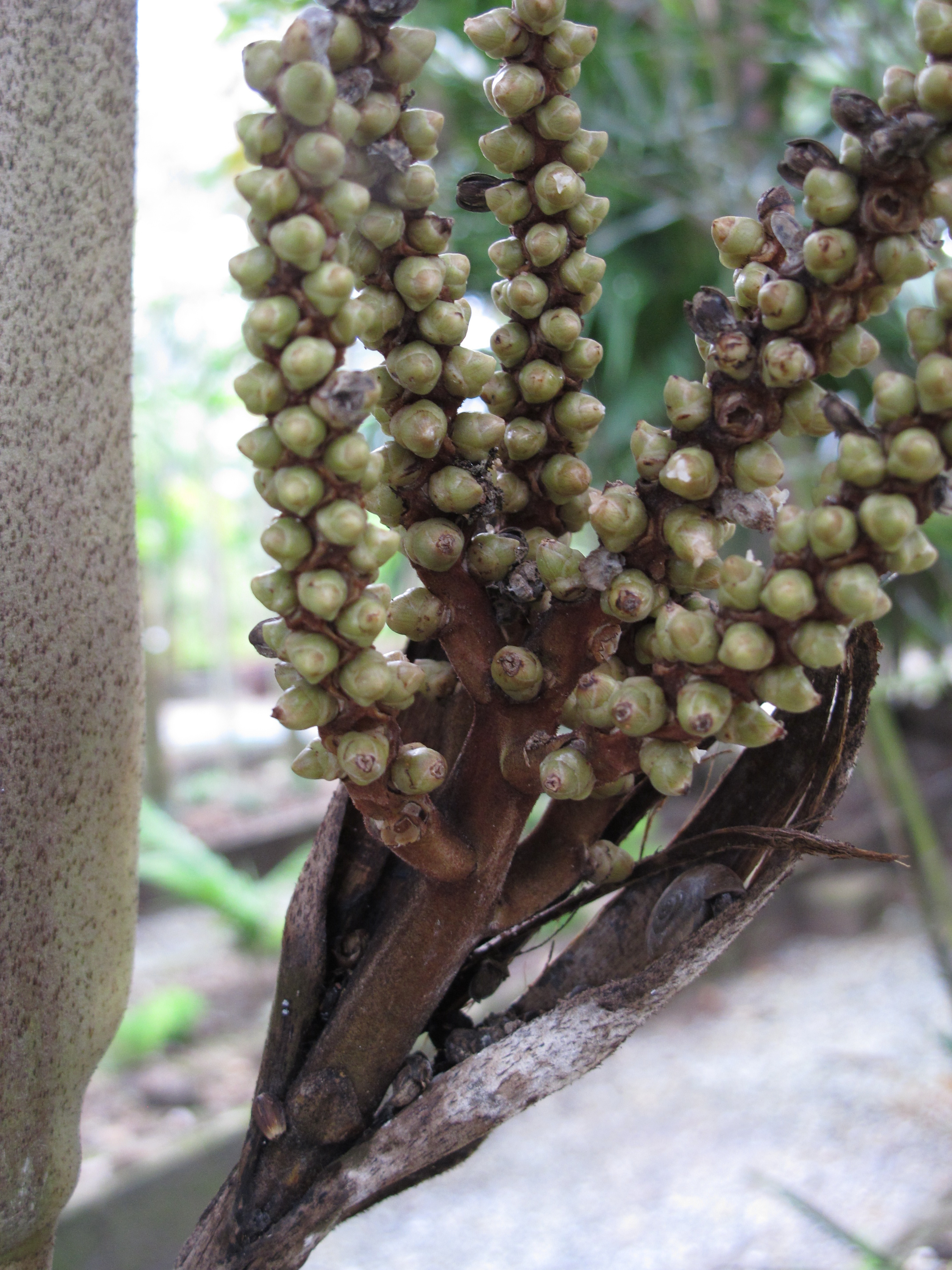

Conservation status
- Data Deficient (IUCN 2.3)

Scientific classification
- Kingdom: Plantae
- Clade: Embryophytes
- Clade: Tracheophytes
- Clade: Spermatophytes
- Clade: Angiosperms
- Clade: Monocots
- Clade: Commelinids
- Order: Arecales
- Family: Arecaceae
- Genus: Drymophloeus
- Species: D. oliviformis

Binomial name
- Drymophloeus oliviformis (Giseke) Miq.

Synonyms
- Areca oliviformis Giseke; Seaforthia oliviformis (Giseke) Mart.; Ptychosperma oliviformis (Giseke) Schaedtler; Drymophloeus rumphii Blume ex Scheff.; Saguaster oliviformis (Giseke) Kuntze; Areca vaginata Giseke; Iriartea leprosa Zipp.; Iriartea monogyna Zipp.; Areca elaeocarpa Reinw. ex Kunth; Seaforthia appendiculata (Blume) Juss. ex Kunth; Seaforthia blumei Juss. ex Kunth; Ptychosperma appendiculatum Blume; Ptychosperma rumphii Blume; Harina rumphii (Blume) Mart.; Seaforthia jaculatoria Mart.; Drymophloeus appendiculatus (Blume) Miq.; Drymophloeus ceramensis Miq.; Drymophloeus ceramensis Scheff.; Drymophloeus bifidus Becc.; Drymophloeus leprosus Becc.; Saguaster appendiculatus (Blume) Kuntze; Saguaster bifidus (Becc.) Kuntze; Saguaster leprosus (Becc.) Kuntze

= Drymophloeus oliviformis =

Species of palm

Drymophloeus oliviformis is a species of flowering plant in the family Arecaceae. It is found only in Indonesia (Maluku and Western New Guinea). It is threatened by habitat loss.
