= Cosmisoma viridescens =

Scientific classification
- Domain: Eukaryota
- Kingdom: Animalia
- Phylum: Arthropoda
- Class: Insecta
- Order: Coleoptera
- Suborder: Polyphaga
- Infraorder: Cucujiformia
- Family: Cerambycidae
- Genus: Cosmisoma
- Species: C. viridescens

Binomial name
- Cosmisoma viridescens Galileo & Martins, 2010

Species of beetle

Cosmisoma viridescens is a species of beetle in the family Cerambycidae. It was described by Galileo & Martins in 2010.
