= Veitchia simulans =

Conservation status
- Data Deficient (IUCN 3.1)

Scientific classification
- Kingdom: Plantae
- Clade: Tracheophytes
- Clade: Angiosperms
- Clade: Monocots
- Clade: Commelinids
- Order: Arecales
- Family: Arecaceae
- Genus: Veitchia
- Species: V. simulans

Binomial name
- Veitchia simulans H.E.Moore

Species of palm

Veitchia simulans is a species of flowering plant in the family Arecaceae. It is endemic to Fiji where it is sometimes referred to by the common name Niusawa.

== Distribution and habitat ==
It is an understorey or subemergent palm, 5 to 15 meters tall, that grows on volcanic soils in wet montane forest at elevations between 400 and 900 meters. It is threatened by habitat loss due to logging.
