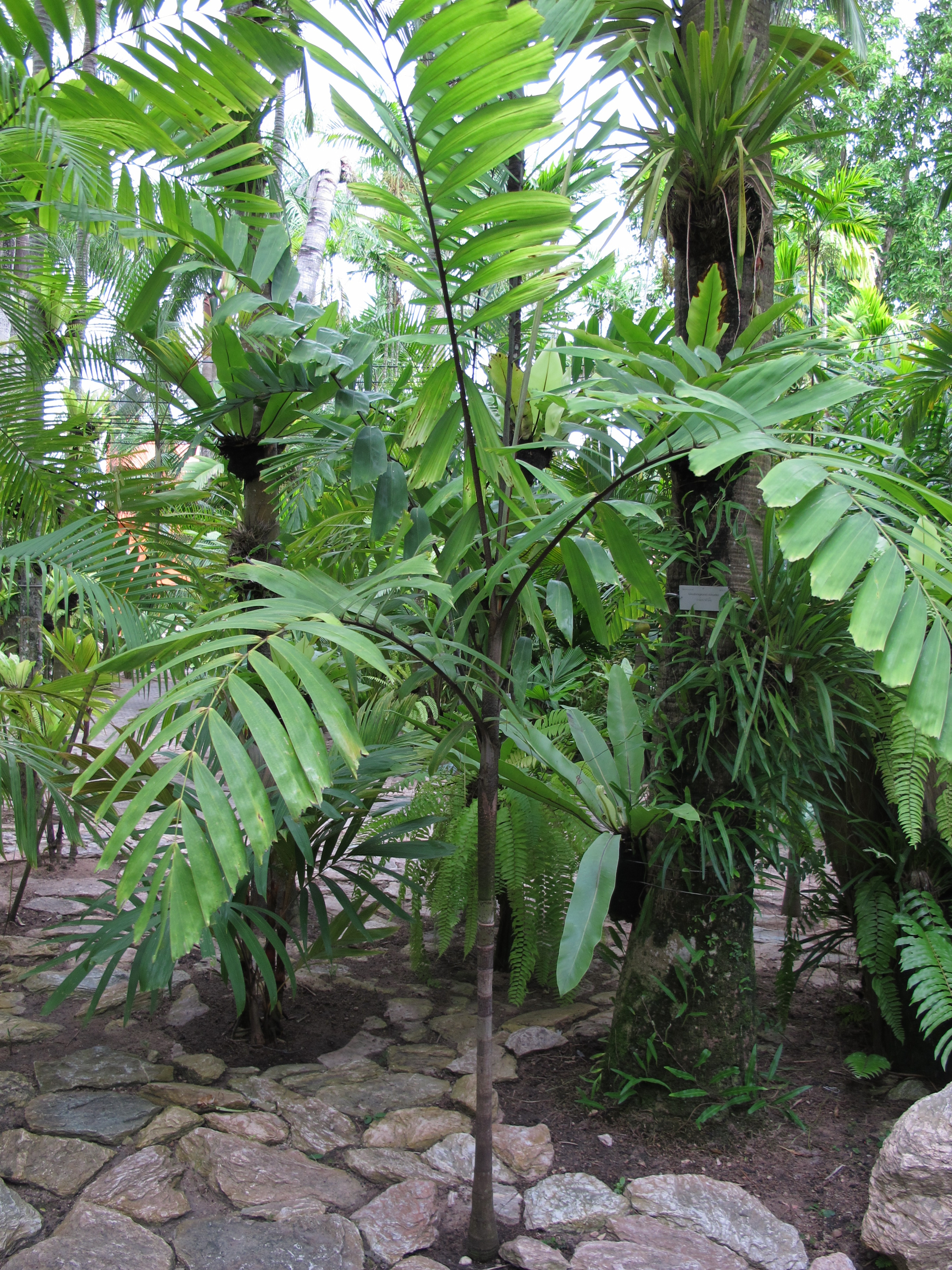

Conservation status
- Least Concern (IUCN 3.1)

Scientific classification
- Kingdom: Plantae
- Clade: Tracheophytes
- Clade: Angiosperms
- Clade: Monocots
- Clade: Commelinids
- Order: Arecales
- Family: Arecaceae
- Genus: Veitchia
- Species: V. vitiensis

Binomial name
- Veitchia vitiensis (H.A.Wendl.) H.E.Moore

= Veitchia vitiensis =

Species of palm

Veitchia vitiensis is a species of flowering plant in the family Arecaceae. It is found only in Fiji.
