= Cosmisoma flavipes =

Scientific classification
- Domain: Eukaryota
- Kingdom: Animalia
- Phylum: Arthropoda
- Class: Insecta
- Order: Coleoptera
- Suborder: Polyphaga
- Infraorder: Cucujiformia
- Family: Cerambycidae
- Genus: Cosmisoma
- Species: C. flavipes

Binomial name
- Cosmisoma flavipes Zajciw, 1962

Species of beetle

Cosmisoma flavipes is a species of beetle in the family Cerambycidae. It was described by Zajciw in 1962.
