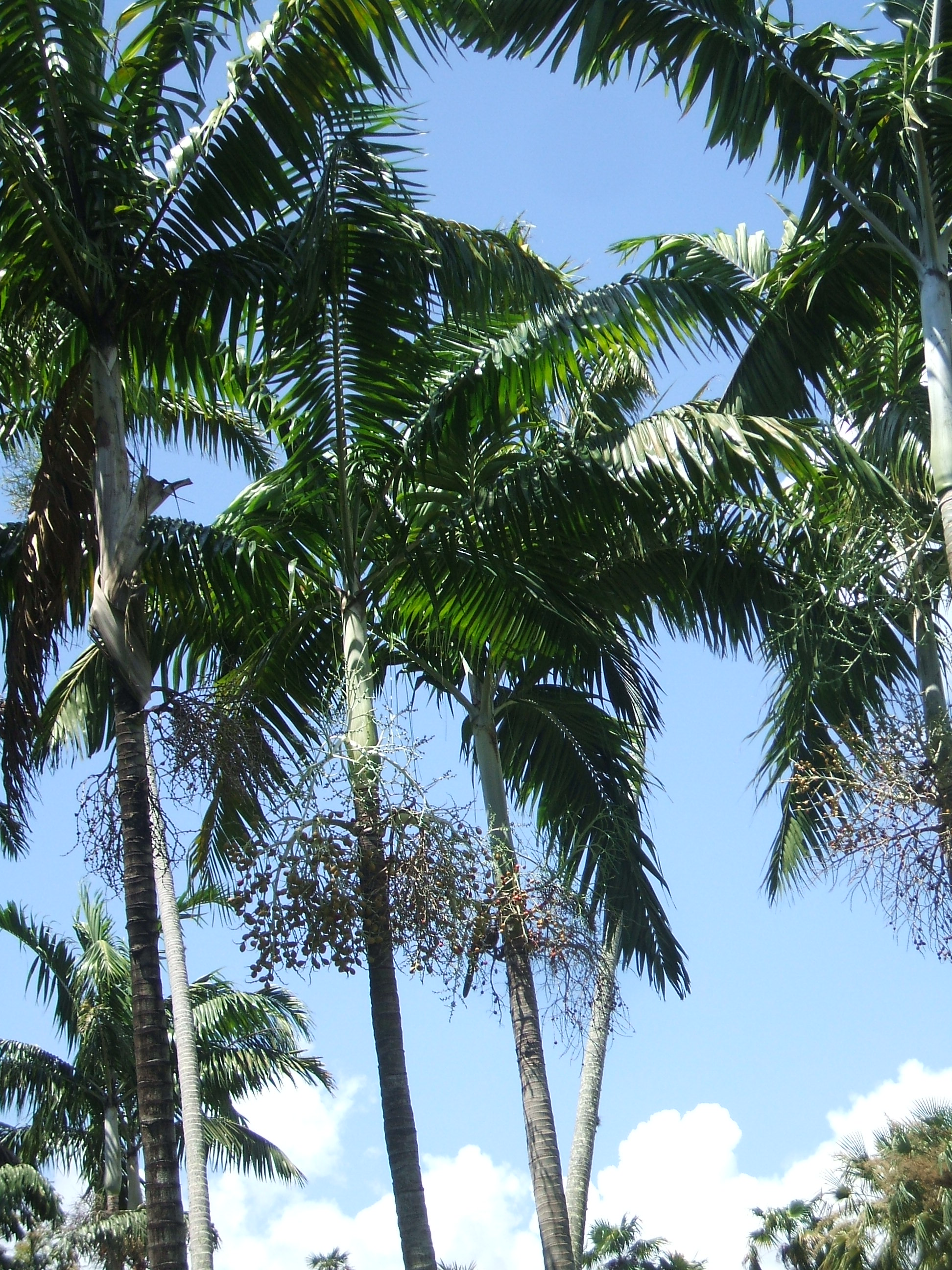
- Veitchia spiralis at Fairchild Tropical Botanic Garden

Conservation status
- Near Threatened (IUCN 2.3)

Scientific classification
- Kingdom: Plantae
- Clade: Tracheophytes
- Clade: Angiosperms
- Clade: Monocots
- Clade: Commelinids
- Order: Arecales
- Family: Arecaceae
- Genus: Veitchia
- Species: V. spiralis

Binomial name
- Veitchia spiralis H.Wendl.

= Veitchia spiralis =

Species of palm

Veitchia spiralis is a species of flowering plant in the family Arecaceae. It is found only in Vanuatu. It is threatened by habitat loss.
