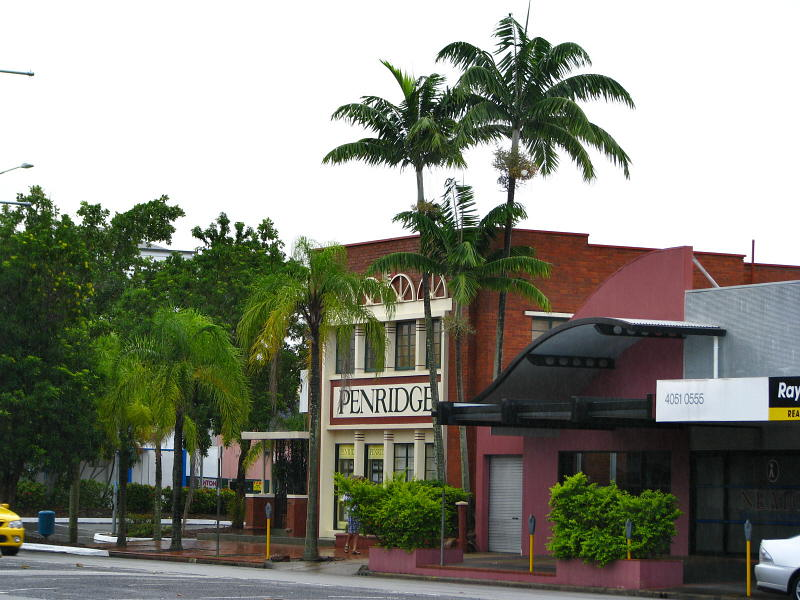

Conservation status
- Least Concern (IUCN 3.1)

Scientific classification
- Kingdom: Plantae
- Clade: Tracheophytes
- Clade: Angiosperms
- Clade: Monocots
- Clade: Commelinids
- Order: Arecales
- Family: Arecaceae
- Genus: Veitchia
- Species: V. joannis

Binomial name
- Veitchia joannis Veitch and H.A. Wendl.

= Veitchia joannis =

Joannis palm

Species of palm

Veitchia joannis, the Joannis palm, is a species of flowering plant in the family Arecaceae. It is native to Fiji and reportedly naturalised in Tonga.
