= Cosmisoma scopipes =

Scientific classification
- Domain: Eukaryota
- Kingdom: Animalia
- Phylum: Arthropoda
- Class: Insecta
- Order: Coleoptera
- Suborder: Polyphaga
- Infraorder: Cucujiformia
- Family: Cerambycidae
- Genus: Cosmisoma
- Species: C. scopipes

Binomial name
- Cosmisoma scopipes Klug, 1852

Species of beetle

Cosmisoma scopipes is a species of beetle in the family Cerambycidae. It was described by Johann Christoph Friedrich Klug in 1852.
