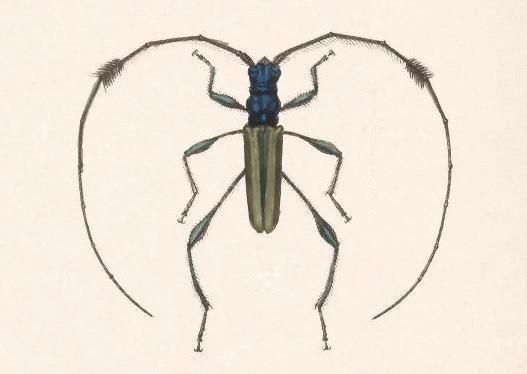

Scientific classification
- Kingdom: Animalia
- Phylum: Arthropoda
- Class: Insecta
- Order: Coleoptera
- Suborder: Polyphaga
- Infraorder: Cucujiformia
- Family: Cerambycidae
- Genus: Cosmisoma
- Species: C. martyr

Binomial name
- Cosmisoma martyr Thomson, 1860

= Cosmisoma martyr =

Species of beetle

Cosmisoma martyr is a species of beetle in the family Cerambycidae. It was described by Thomson in 1860.
