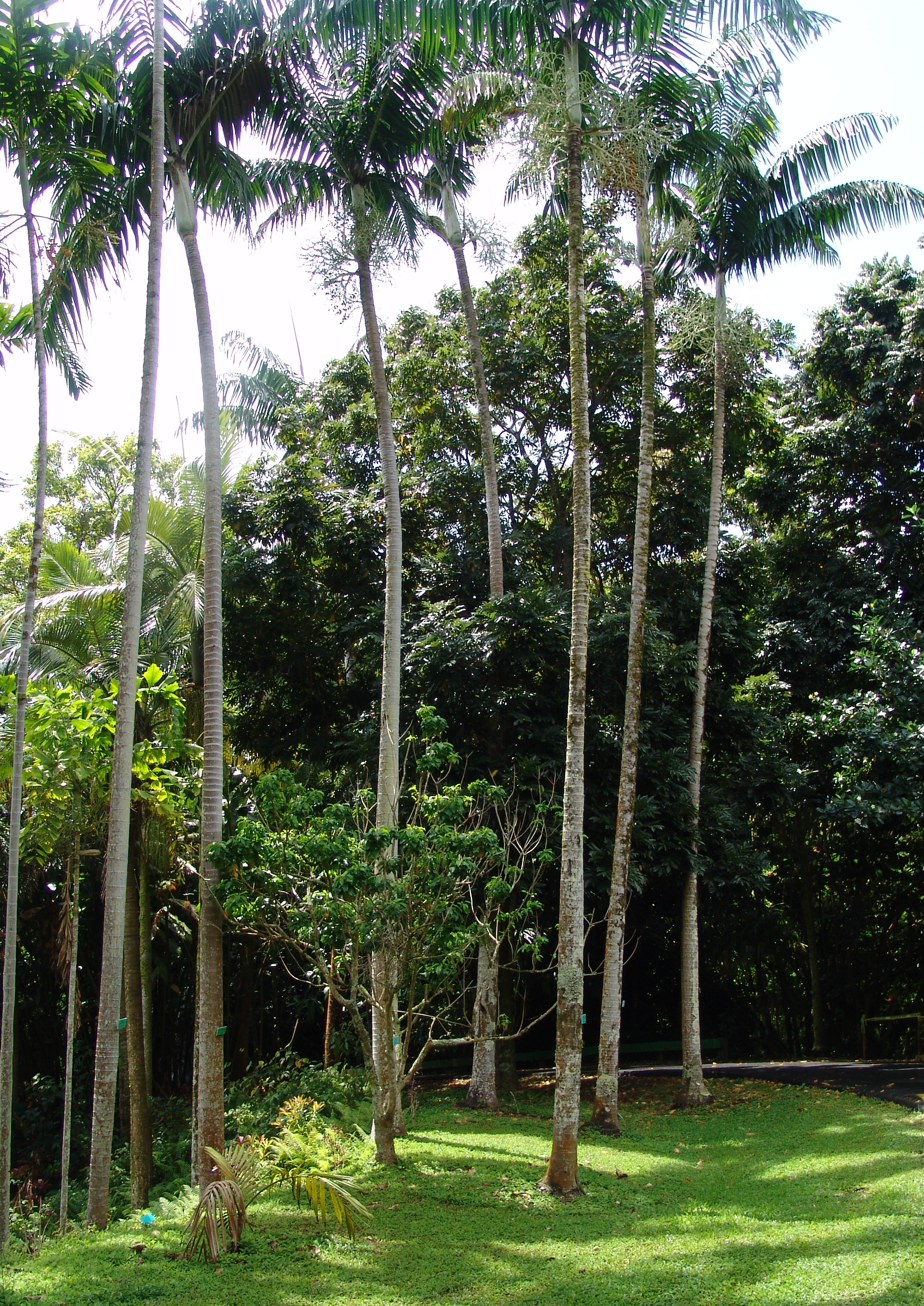

Conservation status
- Endangered (IUCN 2.3)

Scientific classification
- Kingdom: Plantae
- Clade: Tracheophytes
- Clade: Angiosperms
- Clade: Monocots
- Clade: Commelinids
- Order: Arecales
- Family: Arecaceae
- Genus: Veitchia
- Species: V. arecina

Binomial name
- Veitchia arecina Becc.

Synonyms
- Veitchia hookeriana Becc.; Veitchia macdanielsii H.E.Moore; Veitchia montgomeryana H.E.Moore

= Veitchia arecina =

Species of palm

Veitchia arecina, commonly known as Montgomery palm, is a species of flowering plant in the family Arecaceae. It grows up to about 10 m (33 ft) tall and has white or yellow blooms.

It is found only in Vanuatu. It is threatened by habitat loss. It is being offered as a landscape design suggestion in areas of Florida where the annual low temperatures do not exclude it as a choice.
