= Cosmisoma acuminatum =

Scientific classification
- Domain: Eukaryota
- Kingdom: Animalia
- Phylum: Arthropoda
- Class: Insecta
- Order: Coleoptera
- Suborder: Polyphaga
- Infraorder: Cucujiformia
- Family: Cerambycidae
- Genus: Cosmisoma
- Species: C. acuminatum

Binomial name
- Cosmisoma acuminatum Zajciw, 1958

Species of beetle

Cosmisoma acuminatum is a species of beetle in the family Cerambycidae. It was described by Zajciw in 1958.
