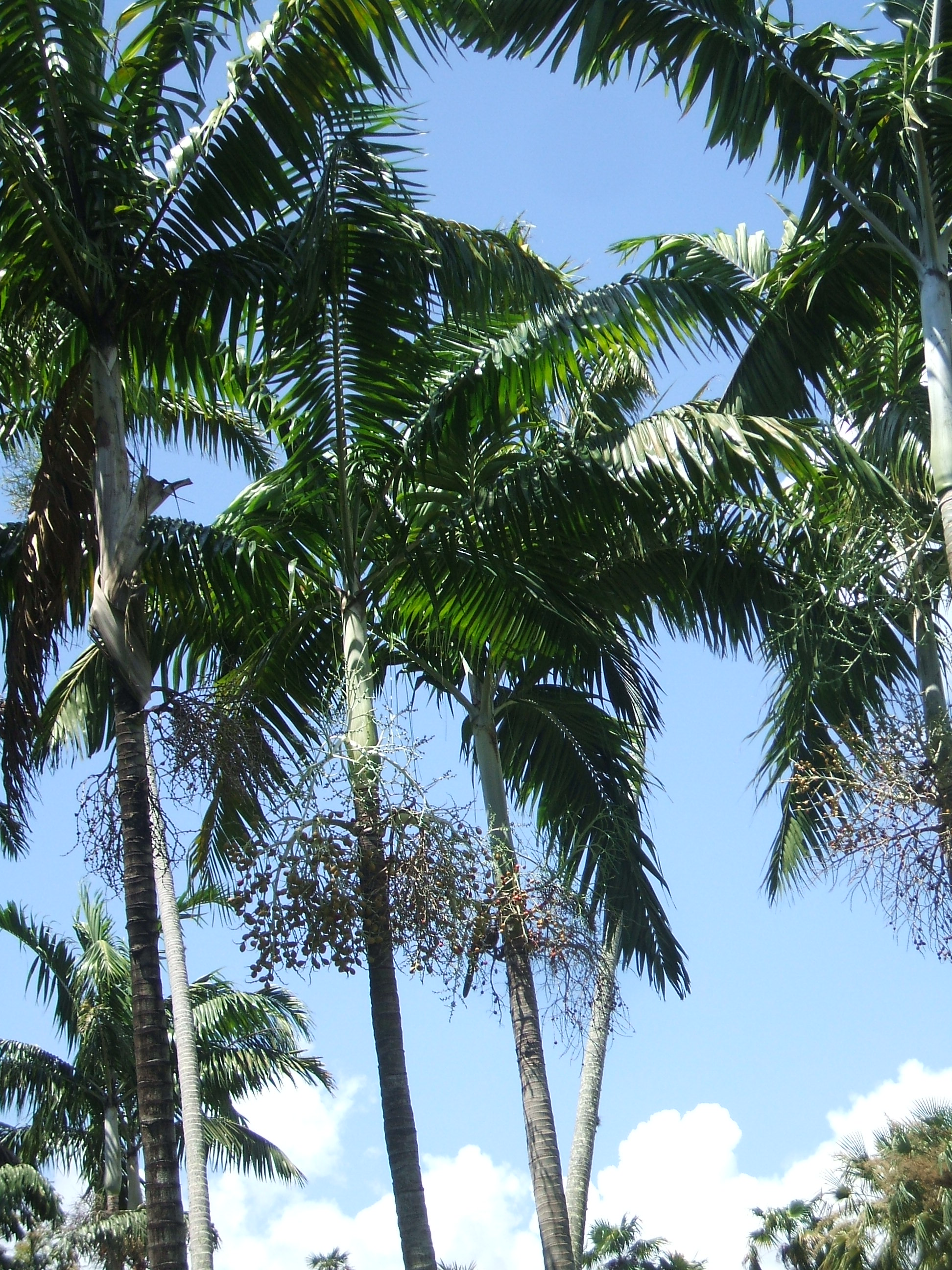
- Veitchia spiralis

Scientific classification
- Kingdom: Plantae
- Clade: Tracheophytes
- Clade: Angiosperms
- Clade: Monocots
- Clade: Commelinids
- Order: Arecales
- Family: Arecaceae
- Subfamily: Arecoideae
- Tribe: Areceae
- Subtribe: Ptychospermatinae
- Genus: Veitchia; H.Wendl. in B.Seemann

Synonyms
- Vitiphoenix Becc.; Kajewskia Guillaumin

= Veitchia =

Genus of palms

Veitchia is a genus of flowering plant in the family Arecaceae.

It contains the following species, all native to islands in the Pacific Ocean (Fiji, Vanuatu, Tonga and the Solomon Islands):

- Veitchia arecina Becc. - Vanuatu
- Veitchia filifera (H.Wendl.) H.E.Moore - Fiji
- Veitchia joannis H.Wendl. (Joannis palm) - Fiji
- Veitchia lepidota (H.E.Moore) C.Lewis & Zona - Solomon Islands
- Veitchia metiti Becc. - Vanuatu
- Veitchia pachyclada (Burret) C.Lewis & Zona - Solomon Islands
- Veitchia simulans H.E.Moore - Fiji
- Veitchia spiralis H.Wendl. - Vanuatu
- Veitchia subdisticha (H.E.Moore) C.Lewis & Zona - Solomon Islands
- Veitchia vitiensis (H.Wendl.) H.E.Moore - Fiji
- Veitchia winin H.E.Moore - Vanuatu

From 1957 to 2008, the Adonidia genus had been merged into Veitchia until being returned to its original status as a separate genus. This is the origin of the Veitchia merrillii name.
