= Veitchia pachyclada =

Conservation status
- Data Deficient (IUCN 2.3)

Scientific classification
- Kingdom: Plantae
- Clade: Tracheophytes
- Clade: Angiosperms
- Clade: Monocots
- Clade: Commelinids
- Order: Arecales
- Family: Arecaceae
- Genus: Veitchia
- Species: V. pachyclada

Binomial name
- Veitchia pachyclada (Burret) C.Lewis & Zona

Synonyms
- Rehderophoenix pachyclada Burret; Drymophloeus pachycladus (Burret) H.E.Moore

Species of palm

Veitchia pachyclada is a plant species in the palm family.

It is found only in Solomon Islands. It is threatened by habitat loss.
