= Cosmisoma argyreum =

Scientific classification
- Domain: Eukaryota
- Kingdom: Animalia
- Phylum: Arthropoda
- Class: Insecta
- Order: Coleoptera
- Suborder: Polyphaga
- Infraorder: Cucujiformia
- Family: Cerambycidae
- Genus: Cosmisoma
- Species: C. argyreum

Binomial name
- Cosmisoma argyreum Bates, 1870

Species of beetle

Cosmisoma argyreum is a species of beetle in the family Cerambycidae. It was described by Bates in 1870.
