= Cosmisoma plumicorne =

Scientific classification
- Kingdom: Animalia
- Phylum: Arthropoda
- Clade: Pancrustacea
- Class: Insecta
- Order: Coleoptera
- Suborder: Polyphaga
- Infraorder: Cucujiformia
- Family: Cerambycidae
- Genus: Cosmisoma
- Species: C. plumicorne

Binomial name
- Cosmisoma plumicorne (Drury, 1782)

Species of beetle

Cosmisoma plumicorne is a species of beetle in the family Cerambycidae. It was described by Dru Drury in 1782.
