= Cosmisoma taunayi =

Scientific classification
- Kingdom: Animalia
- Phylum: Arthropoda
- Class: Insecta
- Order: Coleoptera
- Suborder: Polyphaga
- Infraorder: Cucujiformia
- Family: Cerambycidae
- Genus: Cosmisoma
- Species: C. taunayi

Binomial name
- Cosmisoma taunayi Melzer, 1923

Species of beetle

Cosmisoma taunayi is a species of beetle in the family Cerambycidae. It was described by Melzer in 1923.
