= Cosmisoma aeneicollis =

Scientific classification
- Kingdom: Animalia
- Phylum: Arthropoda
- Class: Insecta
- Order: Coleoptera
- Suborder: Polyphaga
- Infraorder: Cucujiformia
- Family: Cerambycidae
- Genus: Cosmisoma
- Species: C. aeneicollis

Binomial name
- Cosmisoma aeneicollis Erichson, 1848

Species of beetle

Cosmisoma aeneicollis is a species of beetle in the family Cerambycidae. It was described by Erichson in 1848.
