= Veitchia lepidota =

Conservation status
- Data Deficient (IUCN 2.3)

Scientific classification
- Kingdom: Plantae
- Clade: Tracheophytes
- Clade: Angiosperms
- Clade: Monocots
- Clade: Commelinids
- Order: Arecales
- Family: Arecaceae
- Genus: Veitchia
- Species: V. lepidota

Binomial name
- Veitchia lepidota (H.E.Moore) C.Lewis & Zona

Synonyms
- Homotypic Synonyms: Drymophloeus lepidotus H.E.Moore

Species of palm

Veitchia lepidota is a species of flowering plants in the family Arecaceae. It is endemic to the Solomon Islands in the Pacific Ocean.

== Distribution and habitat ==
It has been observed growing in rainforests at elevations of up to 600 meters.
