= Vexillum ochraceum =

Scientific classification
- Kingdom: Animalia
- Phylum: Mollusca
- Class: Gastropoda
- Subclass: Caenogastropoda
- Order: Neogastropoda
- Superfamily: Turbinelloidea
- Family: Costellariidae
- Genus: Vexillum
- Species: V. ochraceum

Binomial name
- Vexillum ochraceum (Hervier, 1897)

Synonyms
- Mitra (Costellaria) ochracea Hervier, 1897 (original combination); Vexillum (Costellaria) ochraceum (Hervier, 1897) ·

Species of gastropod

Vexillum ochraceum is a species of small sea snail, marine gastropod mollusk in the family Costellariidae, the ribbed miters.

== Description ==
The length of the shell attains 9.2 mm, its diameter 4 mm.

The ovate shell has a turriculate shape. The ochreous apex is acuminate. The shell is surrounded by paler zonules and shows many longitudinal ribs. It is transversely furrowed with striae. The shell contains eight whorls, including two smooth whorls in the protoconch. The whorls are smooth, slightly convex and horny. The interspaces are convex. The sutures are crenulate, wide and discrete. The thick vertical ribs are slightly raised. The striae (3-5 in the penultimate whorl) are printed. The ribs are carved in overlapping subsquare tesserae. The zonules are paler towards the middle. The ventricose body whorl composes half the total length. It becomes thinner near the base, narrowed at the rise of the siphonal canal, thickly crested around the siphonal canal, with frequent lirae. The aperture is subovate, inside it is white. The columella has four plaits. The sharp outer lip is subconvex, striated in the aperture.

== Distribution ==
This marine species occurs off New Caledonia.
