= Botanical Garden of TU Darmstadt =

Botanical garden in Germany

Coordinates: 49.8692°N 8.6786°E

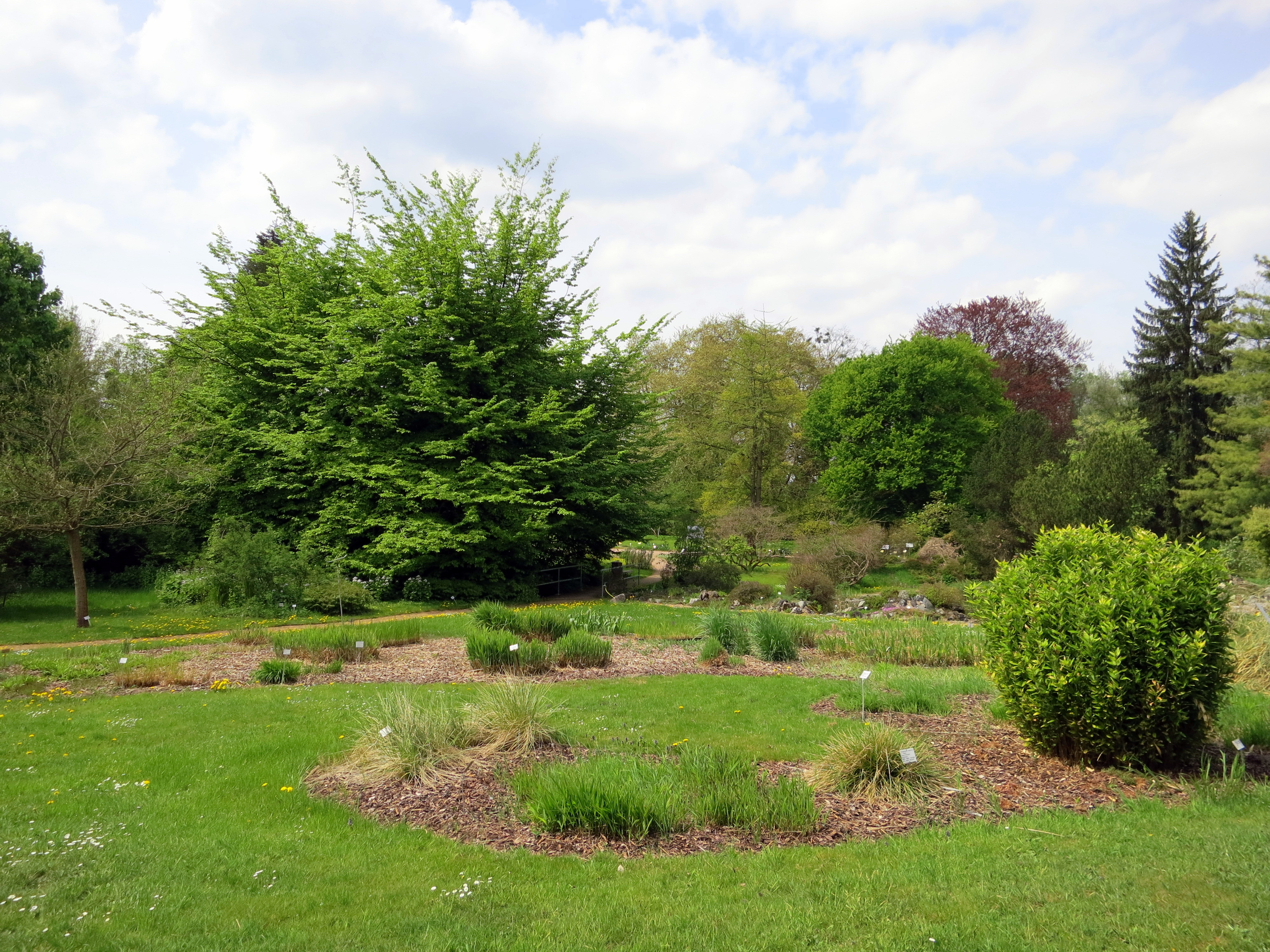
Look at the Botanical Garden

The Botanical Garden of TU Darmstadt (German: Botanischer Garten der TU Darmstadt, also known as the Botanischer Garten Darmstadt) is a botanical garden maintained by the Technische Universität Darmstadt.

Today, the garden comprises about 4.5 ha (11 acres) of open land as well as 1,300 m^{2} (14,000 sq ft) of greenhouse space, on which well over 8,000 plant species are cultivated, with a notable collection of rare trees in its arboretum (1.5 ha (3.7 acres)), as well as an alpine garden and heather. It also contains an extensive collection of tropical and subtropical plants, including tropical marsh plants, cacti, bromeliads, and orchids.

Director is Stefan Schneckenburger.

== Location ==
Technical University of Darmstadt Campus Botanical Garden
Technical University of Darmstadt Campus Botanical Garden
1 Biology
2 Institute of Applied Geosciences (Materials and Earth Sciences)
3 Institute of Microbiology and Genetics
4 Greenhouse
5 Botanical Garden

The Botanical Garden of TU Darmstadt is located at Schnittspahnstrasse 1 – 5, Darmstadt, Hessen, Germany not far from the northernmost point of the Odenwald, and opens daily without charge.

== History ==
The history of the botanical garden dates back to 1814, when the moat of the Residential Palace Darmstadt was fed with the water of the Darmbach and the latter from the sewage of the neighbouring old town, which spread an unbearable stench during the summer months. Johannes Hess, a Grand Ducal building advisor, also interested in botany, therefore proposed draining and the establishment of a botanical garden on the newly acquired site. On 17 June 1814, Louis II, Grand Duke of Hesse, agreed to the plans of Hess.

In the scientifically planned facility, native plants – mainly herbaceous representatives – were cultivated first and foremost. The former court gardener Johann August Schnittspahn was entrusted with the gardening. Soon the garden proved to be completely inadequate, and in 1829/30 it was relocated to the Herrschaftliche Bosquett, today's Herrngarten, where the botanical garden remained until 1838.

In 1830, Georg Friedrich Schnittspahn, a younger brother of Gottfried, was appointed garden inspector. He was the first director of the garden and at the same time a teacher at the higher vocational school, the forerunner of today's Technische Universität Darmstadt. Under the gardening direction of Johann August Schnittspahn and Gottfried Schnittspahn, a new plant was created in cooperation with Hess, which was officially opened in 1831.

After being relocated again, the garden found accommodation in the area of today's Mercksplatz until 1848. Between 1849 and 1863 the botanical garden was found in the Wilhelminenplatz area, but here the garden had to give way to the construction of the Prinz-Ludwig-Palais in 1864. The new home of the botanical garden was a leased site in the Meiereipark, but this area turned out to be too small.

At the expense of the state, the property of the Achensmühle was acquired in 1874. The location and the move cost the state 35,700 guilders. Under the direction of Leopold Dippel, whow as the first director of the new garden and rector and professor at the Technische Universität Darmstadt in the field of cells and tissue, the garden acquired a fine collection of exotic trees. Over the years, together with the gardening director Peter Schmidt, he assembled a collection of foreign woody plants that is still important today.

After Schmidt's death in 1888, Joseph Anton Purpus was appointed garden inspector. Through him and his brother Carl Albert Purpus, a famous traveller and collector, many new plants came into the garden. On 1 April 1897, the garden was annexed to the Technische Universität Darmstadt. The series of garden inspectors and garden managers was continued in 1926 by Friedrich Wilhelm Kesselring, a modest man with extensive plant knowledge and deep piety.

After his retirement in 1947, Franz Börner took over the office until his retirement in 1967. Franz Boerner was long-time president of the German Dendrological Society (DDG) and co-founder of the International Dendrology Society (IDS). From 1965 to 1992, Achim Ritter managed the botanical garden with great personal commitment.

== Gallery ==
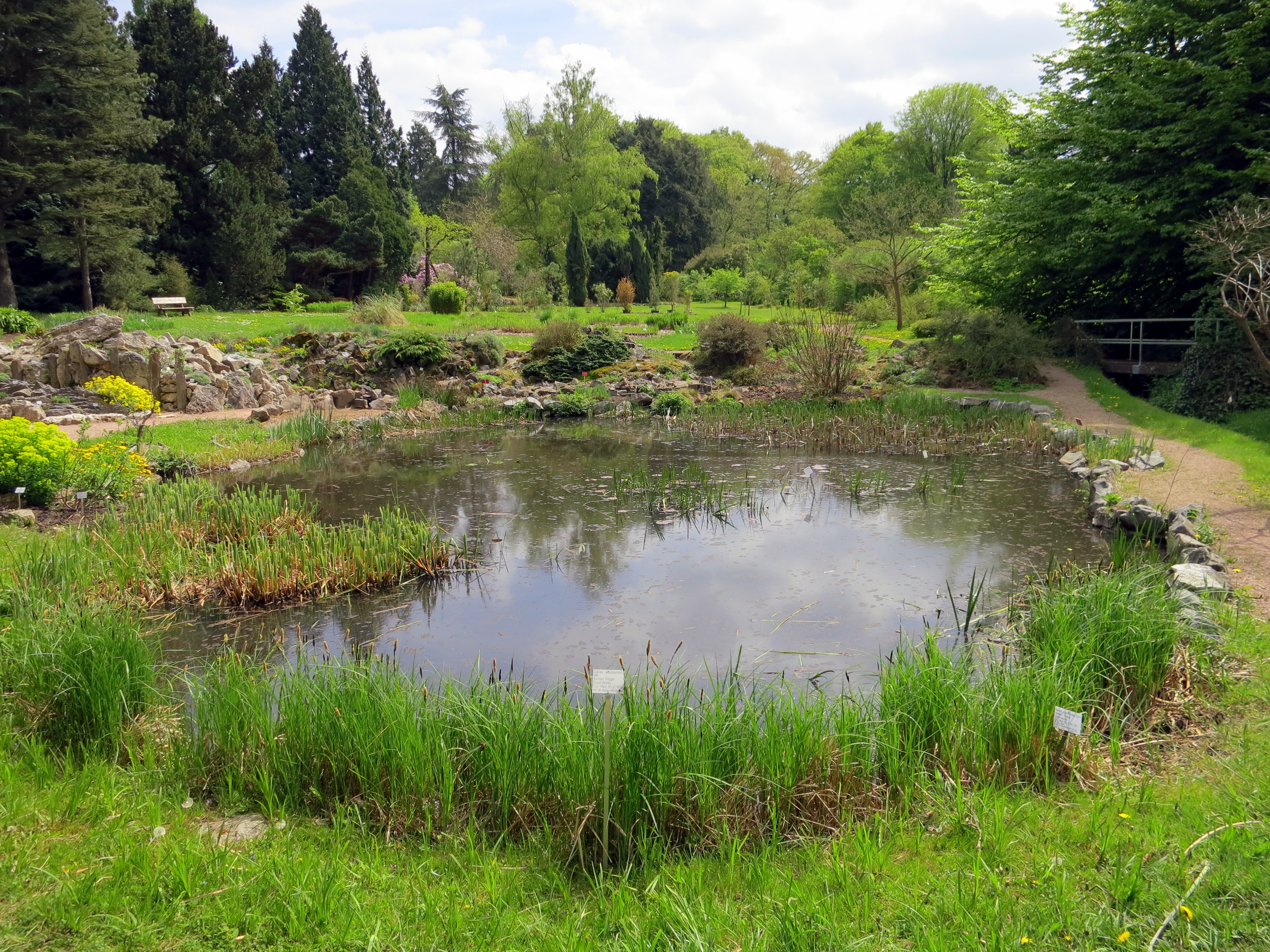
Lake in the Botanical Gardens

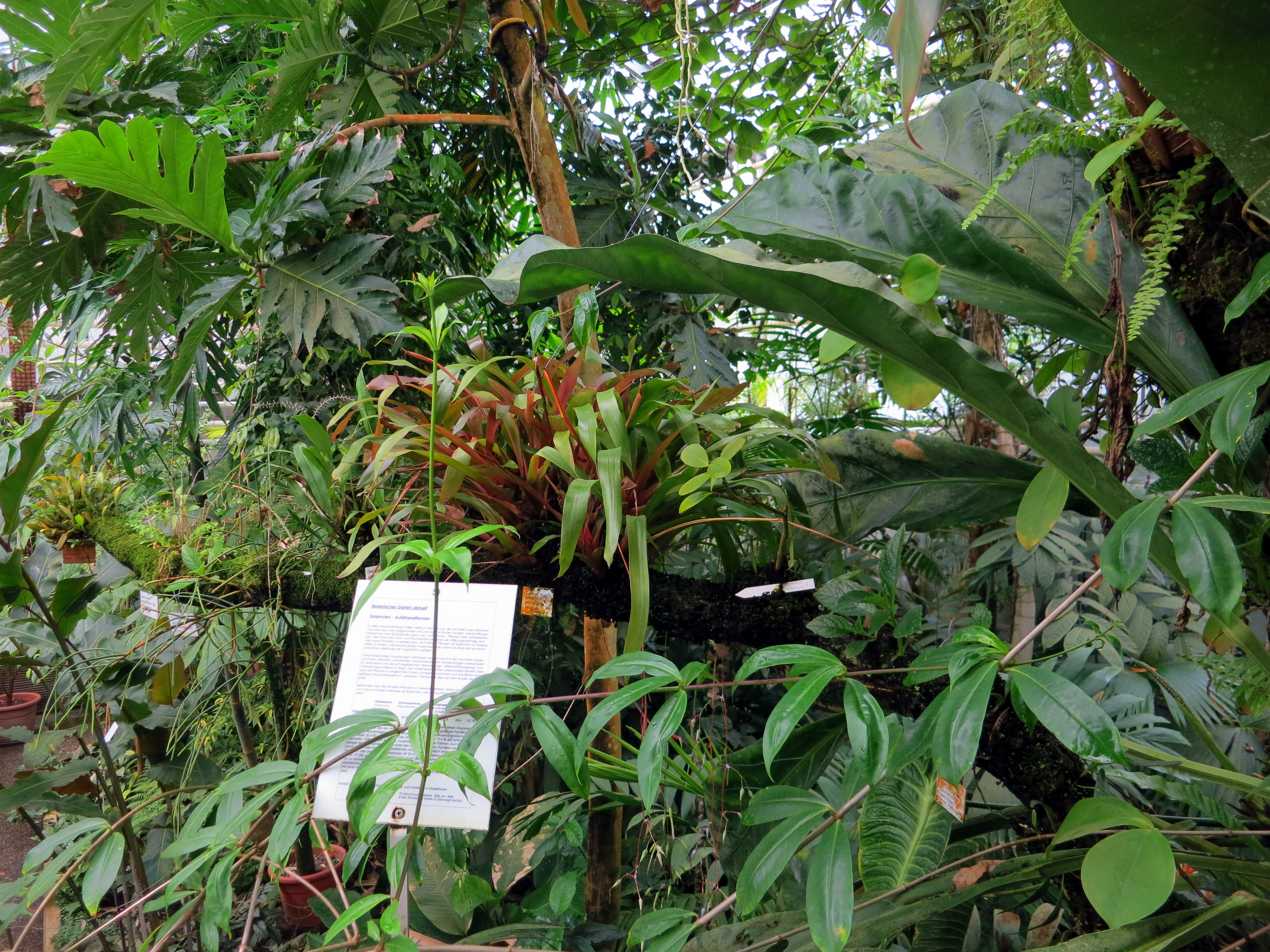
Greenhouse

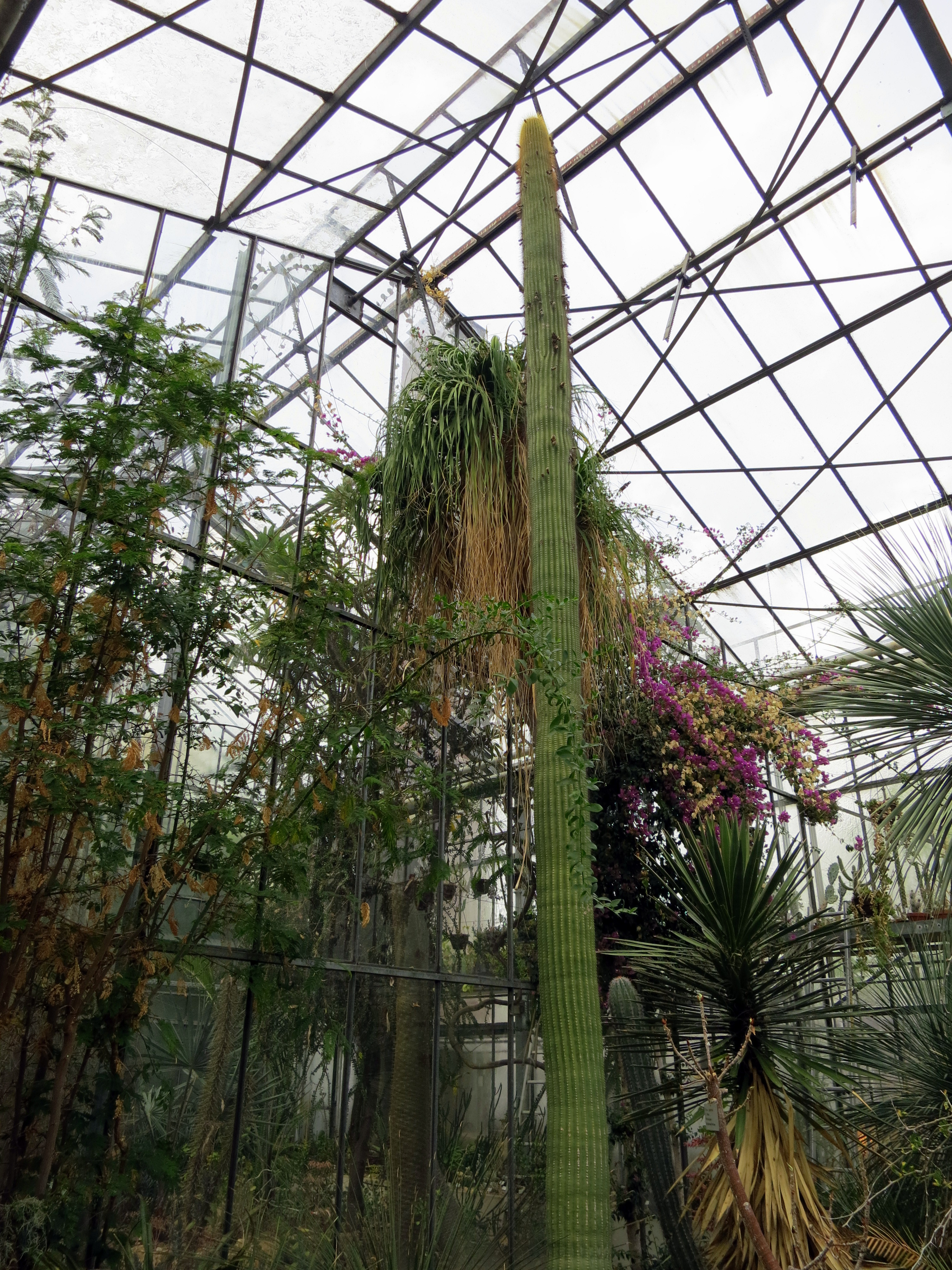
Greenhouse

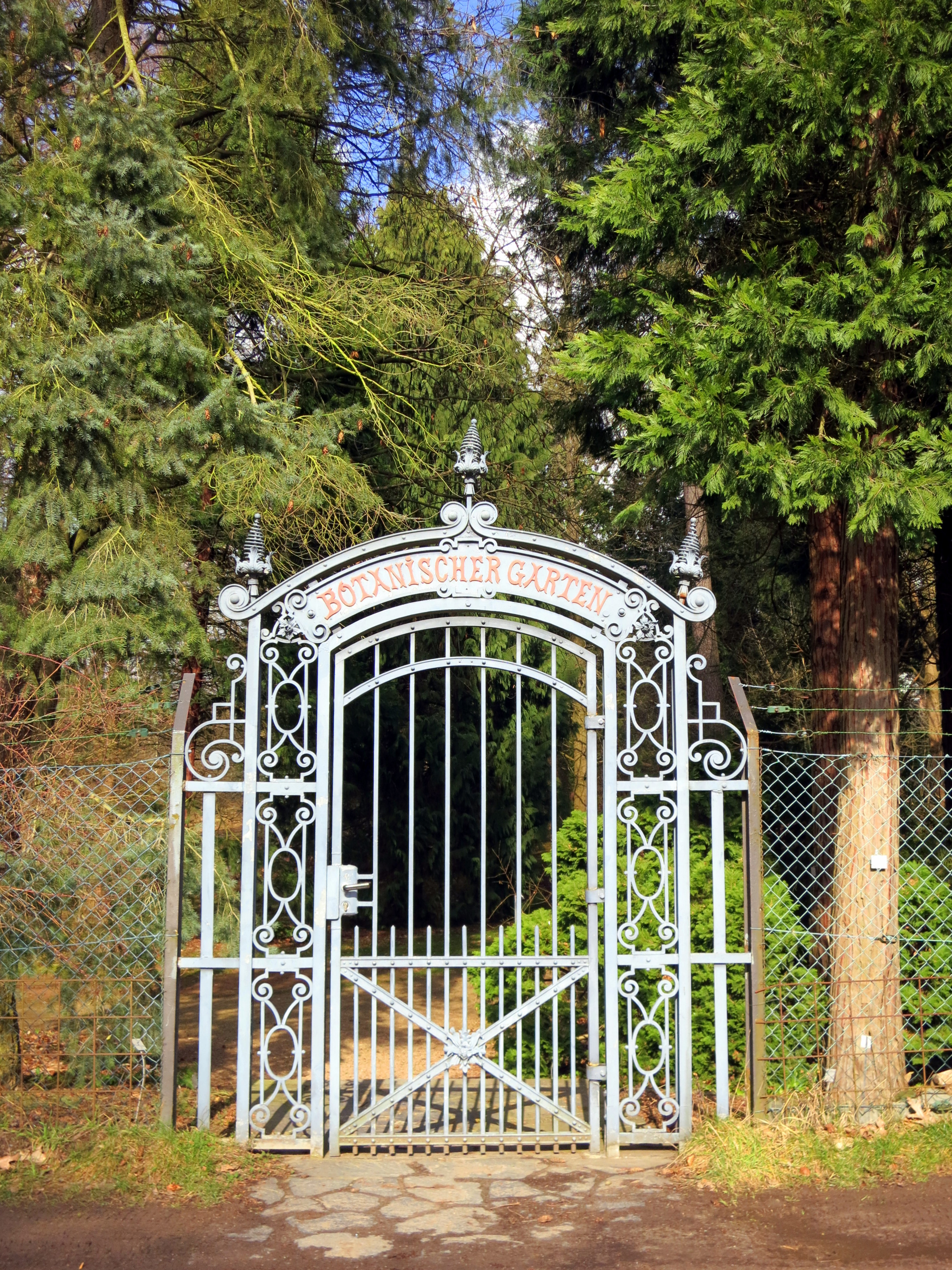
Wrought iron entrance gate to the garden (photographed from the road side)

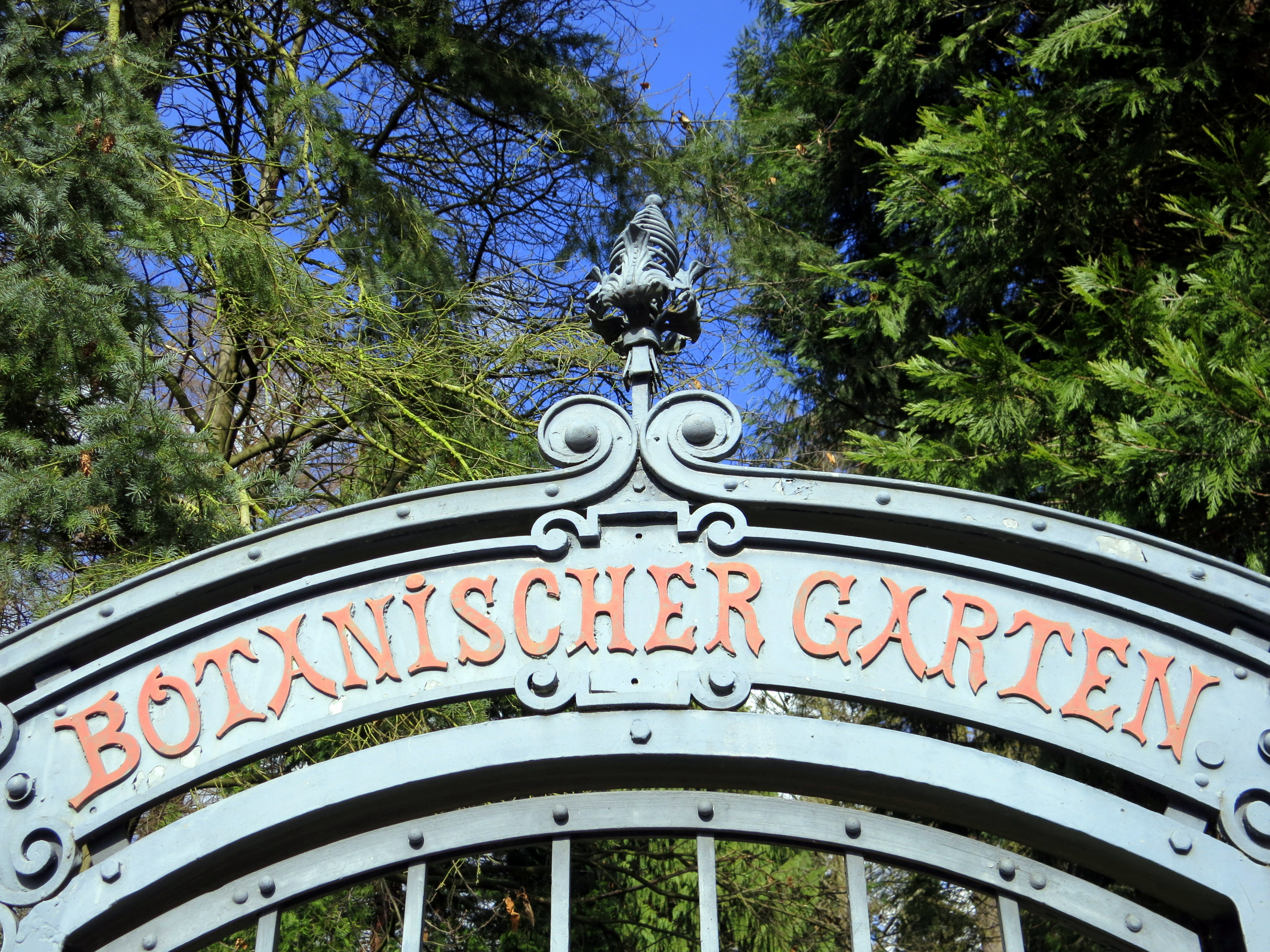
Inscription at the entrance to the garden

== Bibliography ==
- Darmstadt. Botanischer Garten der Technischen Hochschule in: Die botanischen Gärten in Deutschland. Published by Schmidt, Loki, Hamburg (Hoffmann und Campe) 1997, S. 70–74
- Dingeldey, Friedrich: Die frühere Allgemeine Abteilung. Botanik in: Die Technische Hochschule Darmstadt 1836 bis 1936. Ein Bild ihres Werdens und Wirkens. Published by Schlink, Wilhelm, Darmstadt (Peschko) 1936, S. 194–196
- Esselborn, Karl: Darmstädter Gärten geschichtlich betrachtet. Darmstadt 1935
- Grosse-Brauckmann, Gisbert: Botanischer Garten der Technischen Hochschule Darmstadt in: Botanische Gärten Mitteleuropas. Geschichte, technische Einrichtungen, Anlagen, Sammlungen und Aufgaben. Hrsg. von Ebel, Friedrich; Kümmel, Fritz; Beierlein, Christine, Wissenschaftliche Beiträge der Martin-Luther-Universität Halle-Wittenberg, volume 27, Halle 1990, 2. edition, S. 34–36
- Schenck, Heinrich: Das Institut. 17. Der Großherzogliche Botanische Garten zu Darmstadt in: Die Grossherzogliche Technische Hochschule zu Darmstadt 1896–1908. Festschrift zur Feier der Eröffnung der Erweiterungsbauten am 23. Juli 1908, Darmstadt 1908, S. 163–171
- Schneckenburger, Stefan: Carl Albert Purpus. Ein deutscher Pflanzensammler in Amerika. Darmstadt 2001
- Schneckenburger, Stefan: Führer durch den Botanischen Garten der Technischen Hochschule Darmstadt. With a contribution to the story from Inge Freytag, Worms 1996
- Schneckenburger, Stefan: Führer durch den Botanischen Garten der Technischen Hochschule Darmstadt mit einem Beitrag zu seiner Geschichte von Inge Freytag. Darmstadt 1999, 2. edition
- Ziegler, Hubert: Aus der Geschichte der Botanik in Darmstadt in: Berichte der Deutschen Botanischen Gesellschaft, special print, volume 81 (1968), issue 12

== See also ==
- List of botanical gardens in Germany
