= Veitchia subdisticha =

Conservation status
- Data Deficient (IUCN 2.3)

Scientific classification
- Kingdom: Plantae
- Clade: Tracheophytes
- Clade: Angiosperms
- Clade: Monocots
- Clade: Commelinids
- Order: Arecales
- Family: Arecaceae
- Genus: Veitchia
- Species: V. subdisticha

Binomial name
- Veitchia subdisticha (H.E.Moore) C.Lewis & Zona

Synonyms
- Homotypic Synonyms: Drymophloeus subdistichus (H.E.Moore) H.E.Moore; Rehderophoenix subdisticha H.E.Moore

Species of palm

Veitchia subdisticha is a species of flowering plants in the family Arecaceae. It was first formally described by Harold Emery Moore. It is endemic to Solomon Islands.

== Distribution and habitat ==
It is a palm tree that has been observed growing in lowland rainforests is threatened by habitat loss due to logging and wood harvesting.
