= Caloptilia trimaculiformis =

Scientific classification
- Domain: Eukaryota
- Kingdom: Animalia
- Phylum: Arthropoda
- Class: Insecta
- Order: Lepidoptera
- Family: Gracillariidae
- Genus: Caloptilia
- Species: C. trimaculiformis

Binomial name
- Caloptilia trimaculiformis Liu & Yuan, 1990

Species of moth

Caloptilia trimaculiformis is a moth of the family Gracillariidae. It is known from Fujian, China.
