= Caloptilia liparoxantha =

Scientific classification
- Kingdom: Animalia
- Phylum: Arthropoda
- Class: Insecta
- Order: Lepidoptera
- Family: Gracillariidae
- Genus: Caloptilia
- Species: C. liparoxantha

Binomial name
- Caloptilia liparoxantha (Meyrick, 1920)

Synonyms
- Gracilaria liparoxantha Meyrick, 1920

Species of moth

Caloptilia liparoxantha is a moth of the family Gracillariidae. It is known from Queensland, Australia.

The larvae feed on Drypetes australasica. They probably mine the leaves of their host plant.
