= Caloptilia pachyspila =

Scientific classification
- Kingdom: Animalia
- Phylum: Arthropoda
- Class: Insecta
- Order: Lepidoptera
- Family: Gracillariidae
- Genus: Caloptilia
- Species: C. pachyspila

Binomial name
- Caloptilia pachyspila Bradley, 1965

Species of moth

Caloptilia pachyspila is a moth of the family Gracillariidae. It is known from Uganda.
