= Caloptilia dentata =

Scientific classification
- Domain: Eukaryota
- Kingdom: Animalia
- Phylum: Arthropoda
- Class: Insecta
- Order: Lepidoptera
- Family: Gracillariidae
- Genus: Caloptilia
- Species: C. dentata

Binomial name
- Caloptilia dentata Liu & Yuan, 1990

Species of moth

Caloptilia dentata is a moth of the family Gracillariidae. It is known from China (Beijing).

The larvae feed on Acer truncatum. They mine the leaves of their host plant.
