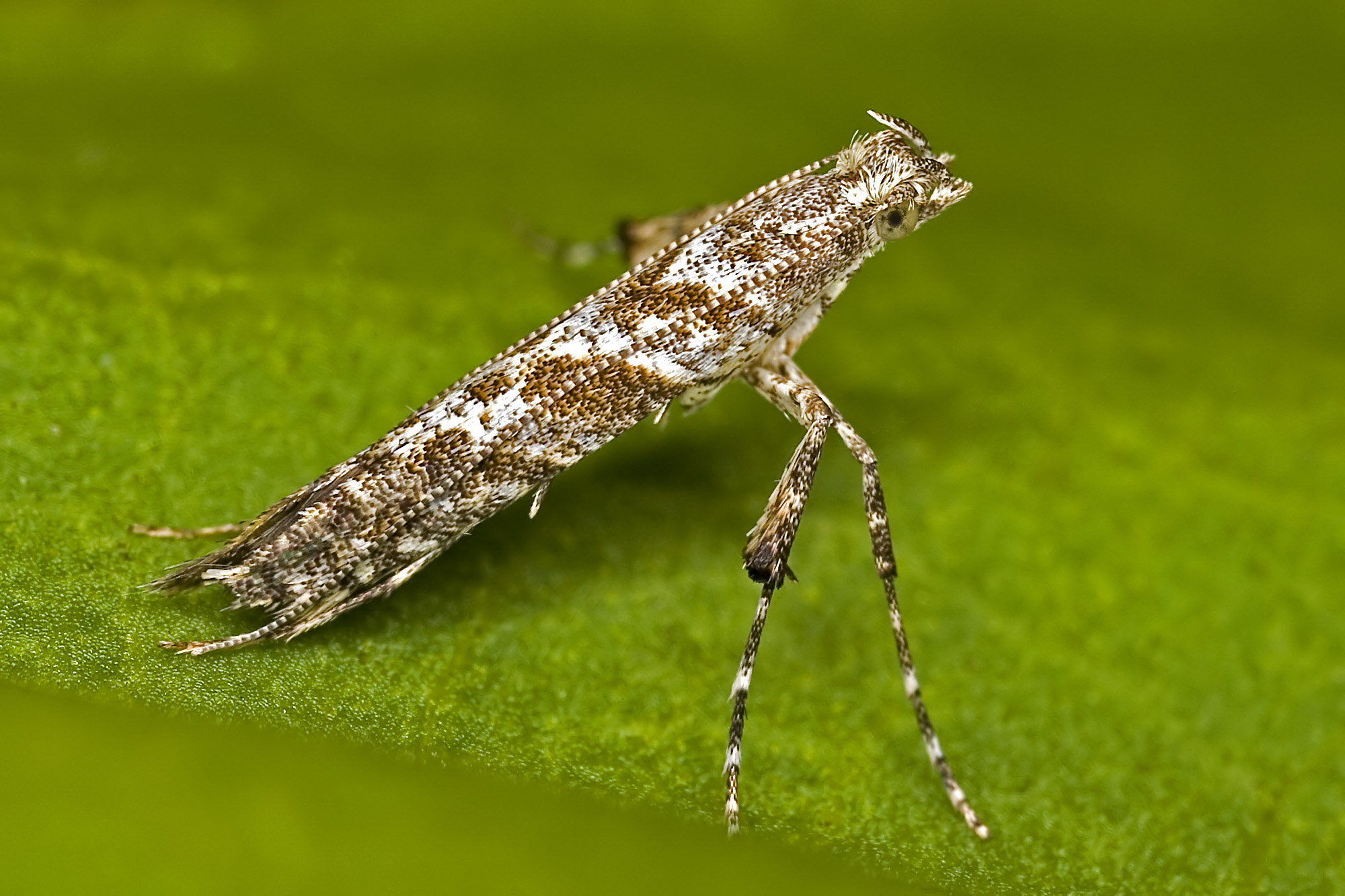
- Caloptilia cuculipennella

Scientific classification
- Domain: Eukaryota
- Kingdom: Animalia
- Phylum: Arthropoda
- Class: Insecta
- Order: Lepidoptera
- Family: Gracillariidae
- Subfamily: Gracillariinae
- Genus: Caloptilia; Hübner, 1825

Synonyms
- Poeciloptilia Hübner, 1825; Ornix Collar, 1832; Ornix Treitschke, 1833; Coriscium Zeler, 1839; Calliptilia Agassiz, 1847; Timodora Meyrick, 1886; Antiolopha Meyrick, 1894; Sphyrophora Vári, 1961; Phylloptilia Kumata, 1982; Rhadinoptilia Kumata, 1982; Minyoptilia Kumata, 1982; Cecidoptilia Kumata, 1982; Povolnya Kuznetzov, 1979

= Caloptilia =

Genus of moths

Caloptilia is a genus of moths in the family Gracillariidae.

== Species ==
- Caloptilia acericola Kumata, 1966
- Caloptilia acericolella Kuznetzov, 1981
- Caloptilia aceriella (Chambers, 1881)
- Caloptilia acerifoliella (Chambers, 1875)
- Caloptilia aceris Kumata, 1966
- Caloptilia acerivorella (Kuznetzov, 1956)
- Caloptilia acinata Yuan & Robinson, 1993
- Caloptilia acrotherma (Meyrick, 1908)
- Caloptilia adelosema (Turner, 1940)
- Caloptilia aeneocapitella (Walsingham, 1891)
- Caloptilia aeolastis (Meyrick, 1920)
- Caloptilia aeolocentra (Meyrick, 1922)
- Caloptilia aeolospila (Meyrick, 1938)
- Caloptilia agrifoliella Opler, 1971
- Caloptilia albospersa (Turner, 1894)
- Caloptilia alchimiella (Scopoli, 1763)
- Caloptilia alni Kumata, 1966
- Caloptilia alnicolella (Chambers, 1875)
- Caloptilia alnivorella (Chambers, 1875)
- Caloptilia alpherakiella (Krulikovsky, 1909)
- Caloptilia amphidelta (Meyrick, 1918)
- Caloptilia anthobaphes (Meyrick, 1921)
- Caloptilia argalea (Meyrick, 1908)
- Caloptilia ariana (Meyrick, 1914)
- Caloptilia asplenifoliatella (Darlington, 1949)
- Caloptilia atomosella (Zeller, 1873)
- Caloptilia auchetidella (Meyrick, 1880)
- Caloptilia aurantiaca (Wollaston, 1858)
- Caloptilia aurifasciata Kumata, 1982
- Caloptilia aurita Triberti, 1989
- Caloptilia aurora (Turner, 1894)
- Caloptilia auspex (Meyrick, 1912)
- Caloptilia azaleella (Brants, 1913)
- Caloptilia baringi Yuan & Robinson, 1993
- Caloptilia behrensella (Chambers, 1876)
- Caloptilia belfragella (Chambers, 1875)
- Caloptilia betulicola (M. Hering, 1928)
- Caloptilia betulivora (McDunnough, 1946)
- Caloptilia bimaculata Liu & Yuan, 1990
- Caloptilia bimaculatella (Ely, 1915)
- Caloptilia bipunctata Kumata, 1982
- Caloptilia bistrigella (Rebel, 1940)
- Caloptilia blandella (Clemens, 1864)
- Caloptilia braccatella (Staudinger, 1870)
- Caloptilia bryonoma (Turner, 1914)
- Caloptilia burgessiella (Zeller, 1873)
- Caloptilia burserella (Busck, 1900)
- Caloptilia callicarpae Kumata, 1982
- Caloptilia callichora (Meyrick, 1915)
- Caloptilia callicirrha (Meyrick, 1924)
- Caloptilia camaronae (Zeller, 1877)
- Caloptilia camphorae Kumata, 1982
- Caloptilia canadensisella (McDunnough, 1956)
- Caloptilia cataractias (Meyrick, 1921)
- Caloptilia cecidophora Kumata, 1966
- Caloptilia celtidis Kumata, 1982
- Caloptilia celtina Vári, 1961
- Caloptilia chalcodelta (Meyrick, 1889)
- Caloptilia chalcoptera (Meyrick, 1880)
- Caloptilia chlorella (Turner, 1894)
- Caloptilia chloroptila (Meyrick, 1915)
- Caloptilia chrysitis (Felder & Rogenhofer, 1875)
- Caloptilia chrysochoa (Meyrick, 1886)
- Caloptilia chrysolampra (Meyrick, 1936)
- Caloptilia chrysoplaca Vári, 1961
- Caloptilia cirrhopis (Meyrick, 1907)
- Caloptilia citrochrysa (Meyrick, 1930)
- Caloptilia clastopetra (Meyrick, 1928)
- Caloptilia columbaepennella (A. Costa, 1839)
- Caloptilia cornusella (Ely, 1915)
- Caloptilia coroniella (Clemens, 1864)
- Caloptilia corrugata (Meyrick, 1918)
- Caloptilia coruscans (Walsingham, 1907)
- Caloptilia crasiphila (Meyrick, 1912)
- Caloptilia crinotibialis Kumata, 1982
- Caloptilia crocostola (Turner, 1917)
- Caloptilia cruzorum Landry, 2006
- Caloptilia cryphia Vári, 1961
- Caloptilia cuculipennella (Hübner, 1796)
- Caloptilia cyanoxantha (Meyrick, 1920)
- Caloptilia dactylifera Liu & Yuan, 1990
- Caloptilia deltanthes (Meyrick, 1935)
- Caloptilia deltosticta (Meyrick, 1933)
- Caloptilia dentata Liu & Yuan, 1990
- Caloptilia dicamica Yuan & Robinson, 1993
- Caloptilia dicksoni Vári, 1961
- Caloptilia diversilobiella Opler, 1969
- Caloptilia dogmatica (Meyrick, 1908)
- Caloptilia dondavisi Landry, 2006
- Caloptilia dubatolovi Baryshnikova, 2007
- Caloptilia ecphanes (Turner, 1940)
- Caloptilia elaeas (Meyrick, 1911)
- Caloptilia elongella (Linnaeus, 1761)
- Caloptilia emas Yuan & Robinson, 1993
- Caloptilia eolampis (Meyrick, 1915)
- Caloptilia etiolata Yuan & Robinson, 1993
- Caloptilia euglypta (Turner, 1894)
- Caloptilia euhelia Diakonoff, 1955
- Caloptilia eurycnema (Turner, 1894)
- Caloptilia eurycryptis (Meyrick, 1928)
- Caloptilia euryptera (Meyrick, 1908)
- Caloptilia eurythiota (Turner, 1913)
- Caloptilia euxesta (Turner, 1913)
- Caloptilia falconipennella (Hübner, 1813)
- Caloptilia fera Triberti, 1989
- Caloptilia ferruginella (Braun, 1918)
- Caloptilia fidella (Reutti, 1853)
- Caloptilia flava (Staudinger, 1871)
- Caloptilia flavella (Ely, 1915)
- Caloptilia flavida Liu & Yuan, 1990
- Caloptilia flavimaculella (Ely, 1915)
- Caloptilia fraxinella (Ely, 1915)
- Caloptilia fribergensis (Fritzsche, 1871)
- Caloptilia galacotra Landry, 2006
- Caloptilia garcinicola Liu & Yuan, 1990
- Caloptilia geminata Kumata, 1966
- Caloptilia gladiatrix (Meyrick, 1922)
- Caloptilia gloriosa Kumata, 1966
- Caloptilia glutinella (Ely, 1915)
- Caloptilia glyphidopis (Meyrick, 1934)
- Caloptilia hamulifera Liu & Yuan, 1990
- Caloptilia hemiconis (Meyrick, 1894)
- Caloptilia hemidactylella ([Denis & Schiffermüller], 1775)
- Caloptilia hercoscelis (Meyrick, 1939)
- Caloptilia heringi Kumata, 1966
- Caloptilia heterocosma (Meyrick, 1931)
- Caloptilia hexameris (Meyrick, 1921)
- Caloptilia hidakensis Kumata, 1966
- Caloptilia hilaropis (Meyrick, 1926)
- Caloptilia honoratella (Rebel, 1914)
- Caloptilia hypericella (Braun, 1918)
- Caloptilia hypodroma Liu & Yuan, 1990
- Caloptilia illicii Kumata, 1966
- Caloptilia immuricata (Meyrick, 1915)
- Caloptilia infaceta Triberti, 1987
- Caloptilia ingrata Triberti, 1989
- Caloptilia insidia Clarke, 1986
- Caloptilia insolita Triberti, 1989
- Caloptilia invariabilis (Braun, 1927)
- Caloptilia iophanes (Meyrick, 1912)
- Caloptilia iorphna (Meyrick, 1939)
- Caloptilia iridophanes (Meyrick, 1935)
- Caloptilia ischiastris (Meyrick, 1907)
- Caloptilia iselaea (Meyrick, 1914)
- Caloptilia isochrysa (Meyrick, 1908)
- Caloptilia isotoma (Meyrick, 1914)
- Caloptilia issikii Kumata, 1982
- Caloptilia janeae Bradley, 1965
- Caloptilia jasminicola Liu & Yuan, 1990
- Caloptilia jelita Yuan & Robinson, 1993
- Caloptilia juglandiella (Chambers, 1872)
- Caloptilia kadsurae Kumata, 1966
- Caloptilia kisoensis Kumata, 1982
- Caloptilia koelreutericola Liu & Yuan, 1990
- Caloptilia korbiella (Caradja, 1920)
- Caloptilia kurokoi Kumata, 1966
- Caloptilia laurifoliae (M. Hering, 1927)
- Caloptilia leptophanes (Meyrick, 1928)
- Caloptilia leptospila Vári, 1961
- Caloptilia leucapennella (Stephens, 1835)
- Caloptilia leucolitha (Meyrick, 1912)
- Caloptilia leucothoes Kumata, 1982
- Caloptilia linearis (Butler, 1877)
- Caloptilia liparoxantha (Meyrick, 1920)
- Caloptilia loxocentra (Turner, 1915)
- Caloptilia mabaella (Swezey, 1910)
- Caloptilia macranthes (Meyrick, 1928)
- Caloptilia macropleura (Meyrick, 1932)
- Caloptilia magnifica (Stainton, 1867)
- Caloptilia magnoliae Kumata, 1966
- Caloptilia mandschurica (Christoph, 1882)
- Caloptilia mastopis (Meyrick, 1918)
- Caloptilia matsumurai Kumata, 1982
- Caloptilia maynei Ghesquière, 1940
- Caloptilia megalaurata Legrand, 1965
- Caloptilia megalotis (Meyrick, 1908)
- Caloptilia melanocarpae (Braun, 1925)
- Caloptilia metadoxa (Meyrick, 1908)
- Caloptilia meyricki Vári, 1961
- Caloptilia minimella (Ely, 1915)
- Caloptilia modica Triberti, 1987
- Caloptilia monticola Kumata, 1966
- Caloptilia murtfeldtella (Busck, 1904)
- Caloptilia mutilata (Staudinger, 1880)
- Caloptilia negundella (Chambers, 1876)
- Caloptilia nobilella (Klimesch, 1942)
- Caloptilia nomurai Yuan & Robinson, 1993
- Caloptilia nondeterminata (Braun, 1939)
- Caloptilia obliquatella (Matsumura, 1931)
- Caloptilia obscuripennella (Frey & Boll, 1876)
- Caloptilia octopunctata (Turner, 1894)
- Caloptilia oenopella (Meyrick, 1880)
- Caloptilia onustella (Hübner, 1813)
- Caloptilia oriarcha (Meyrick, 1915)
- Caloptilia orientalis Ermolaev, 1979
- Caloptilia ostracodes (Turner, 1917)
- Caloptilia ostryaeella (Chambers, 1878)
- Caloptilia ovatiella Opler, 1969
- Caloptilia oxydelta (Meyrick, 1908)
- Caloptilia pachyspila Bradley, 1965
- Caloptilia packardella (Chambers, 1872)
- Caloptilia palaearcha (Meyrick, 1930)
- Caloptilia pallescens (Staudinger, 1880)
- Caloptilia palustriella (Braun, 1910)
- Caloptilia panchrista (Turner, 1913)
- Caloptilia paradoxum (Frey & Boll, 1873)
- Caloptilia parasticta (Meyrick, 1908)
- Caloptilia pastranai (Bourquin, 1962)
- Caloptilia pedina (Turner, 1923)
- Caloptilia pekinensis Liu & Yuan, 1990
- Caloptilia peltophanes (Meyrick, 1907)
- Caloptilia pentaphylactis (Meyrick, 1938)
- Caloptilia pentaplaca (Meyrick, 1911)
- Caloptilia perisphena (Meyrick, 1905)
- Caloptilia perixesta (Turner, 1913)
- Caloptilia perseae (Busck, 1920)
- Caloptilia phalaropa (Meyrick, 1912)
- Caloptilia phiaropis (Meyrick, 1921)
- Caloptilia plagata (Stainton, 1862)
- Caloptilia plagiotoma (Turner, 1913)
- Caloptilia platycosma (Meyrick, 1912)
- Caloptilia pneumatica (Meyrick, 1920)
- Caloptilia poecilostola Vári, 1961
- Caloptilia populetorum (Zeller, 1839)
- Caloptilia populiella (Chambers, 1875)
- Caloptilia porphyracma (Meyrick, 1922)
- Caloptilia porphyranthes (Meyrick, 1921)
- Caloptilia porphyretica (Braun, 1923)
- Caloptilia prismatica (Meyrick, 1907)
- Caloptilia prosticta (Meyrick, 1909)
- Caloptilia protiella (van Deventer, 1904)
- Caloptilia pseudoaurita Triberti, 1989
- Caloptilia pterostoma (Meyrick, 1922)
- Caloptilia ptychospora (Meyrick, 1938)
- Caloptilia pulchella (Chambers, 1875)
- Caloptilia pulverea Kumata, 1966
- Caloptilia pyrrhaspis (Meyrick, 1931)
- Caloptilia pyrrhochroma Vári, 1961
- Caloptilia quadripunctata Liu & Yuan, 1990
- Caloptilia querci (Kumata, 1982)
- Caloptilia quercinigrella (Ely, 1915)
- Caloptilia recitata (Meyrick, 1918)
- Caloptilia reticulata (Braun, 1910)
- Caloptilia rhodinella (Herrich-Schäffer, 1855)
- Caloptilia rhodorella (McDunnough, 1954)
- Caloptilia rhoifoliella (Chambers, 1876)
- Caloptilia rhois Kumata, 1982
- Caloptilia rhusina Vári, 1961
- Caloptilia ribesella (Chambers, 1877)
- Caloptilia rjabovi Kuznetzov & Baryshnikova, 2001
- Caloptilia robustella Jäckh, 1972
- Caloptilia roscipennella (Hübner, 1796)
- Caloptilia rufipennella (Hübner, 1796)
- Caloptilia ryukyuensis Kumata, 1966
- Caloptilia saccisquamata Liu & Yuan, 1990
- Caloptilia sachalinella Ermolaev, 1984
- Caloptilia sanguinella (Beutenmüller, 1888)
- Caloptilia sapiivora Kumata, 1982
- Caloptilia sapina Vári, 1961
- Caloptilia sapporella (Matsumura, 1931)
- Caloptilia sassafrasella (Chambers, 1876)
- Caloptilia sassafrasicola Liu & Yuan, 1990
- Caloptilia sauzalitoeella (Chambers, 1876)
- Caloptilia scaenica Triberti, 1987
- Caloptilia scaeodesma (Meyrick, 1928)
- Caloptilia scansoria (Meyrick, 1910)
- Caloptilia schinusifolia D.R. Davis & Wheeler, 2011
- Caloptilia schisandrae Kumata, 1966
- Caloptilia scutellariella (Braun, 1923)
- Caloptilia scutigera (Meyrick, 1921)
- Caloptilia sebastianiella (Busck, 1900)
- Caloptilia selenitis (Meyrick, 1909)
- Caloptilia selimpat Yuan & Robinson, 1993
- Caloptilia semiclausa (Meyrick, 1921)
- (Caloptilia semifascia (Haworth, 1828))
- Caloptilia semifasciella Kumata, 1966
- Caloptilia semnophanes (Meyrick, 1918)
- Caloptilia serotinella (Ely, 1910)
- Caloptilia sichuanensis Liu & Yuan, 1990
- Caloptilia similatella (Zeller, 1877)
- Caloptilia soyella (van Deventer, 1904)
- Caloptilia speciosella (Braun, 1939)
- Caloptilia sphenocrossa (Meyrick, 1934)
- Caloptilia spinulosa Liu & Yuan, 1990
- Caloptilia staintoni (Wollaston, 1858)
- Caloptilia stictocrossa (Turner, 1947)
- Caloptilia stigmatella (Fabricius, 1781)
- Caloptilia striata Liu & Yuan, 1990
- Caloptilia strictella (Walker, 1864)
- Caloptilia striolata (Liu & Yuan, 1990)
- Caloptilia suberinella (Tengström, 1848)
- Caloptilia superbifrontella (Clemens, 1860)
- Caloptilia sychnospila Vári, 1961
- Caloptilia syngenica Vári, 1961
- Caloptilia syrphetias (Meyrick, 1907)
- Caloptilia tangkai Yuan & Robinson, 1993
- Caloptilia teleodelta (Meyrick, 1926)
- Caloptilia teucra (Meyrick, 1933)
- Caloptilia theivora (Walsingham, 1891)
- Caloptilia thiophylla (Turner, 1913)
- Caloptilia thiosema (Turner, 1913)
- Caloptilia thymophanes (Meyrick, 1928)
- Caloptilia tirantella Legrand, 1965
- Caloptilia titanitis (Meyrick, 1921)
- Caloptilia tmetica Diakonoff, 1955
- Caloptilia triadicae Davis in Davis et al., 2013
- Caloptilia tricolor Liu & Yuan, 1990
- Caloptilia trimaculiformis Liu & Yuan, 1990
- Caloptilia trissochroa (Meyrick, 1931)
- Caloptilia ulmi Kumata, 1982
- Caloptilia umbratella (Braun, 1927)
- Caloptilia vacciniella (Ely, 1915)
- Caloptilia variegata Kuznetzov & Baryshnikova, 2001
- Caloptilia verecunda Triberti, 2004
- Caloptilia vibrans (Meyrick, 1918)
- Caloptilia vicinola Vári, 1961
- Caloptilia violacella (Clemens, 1860)
- Caloptilia viridula (Zeller, 1877)
- Caloptilia wakayamensis Kumata, 1966
- Caloptilia xanthocephala Vári, 1961
- Caloptilia xanthochiria Vári, 1961
- Caloptilia xanthopharella (Meyrick, 1880)
- Caloptilia xylophanes (Turner, 1894)
- Caloptilia xystophanes (Turner, 1913)
- Caloptilia yasudai Kumata, 1982
- Caloptilia zachrysa (Meyrick, 1907)
- Caloptilia zonotarsa (Meyrick, 1936)
