= Caloptilia flavida =

Scientific classification
- Domain: Eukaryota
- Kingdom: Animalia
- Phylum: Arthropoda
- Class: Insecta
- Order: Lepidoptera
- Family: Gracillariidae
- Genus: Caloptilia
- Species: C. flavida

Binomial name
- Caloptilia flavida Liu & Yuan, 1990

Species of moth

Caloptilia flavida is a moth of the family Gracillariidae. It is known from China (Hunan and Sichuan) and Thailand.

The larvae feed on Ziziphus jujuba and Ziziphus mauritiana. They mine the leaves of their host plant.
