= Caloptilia pastranai =

Scientific classification
- Domain: Eukaryota
- Kingdom: Animalia
- Phylum: Arthropoda
- Class: Insecta
- Order: Lepidoptera
- Family: Gracillariidae
- Genus: Caloptilia
- Species: C. pastranai

Binomial name
- Caloptilia pastranai (Bourquin, 1962)

Species of moth

Caloptilia pastranai is a moth of the family Gracillariidae. It is known from Argentina.

The larvae feed on Scutia buxifolia. The larvae feed in enrolled leaves. They often changed to a new leaf.
