= Caloptilia insolita =

Scientific classification
- Kingdom: Animalia
- Phylum: Arthropoda
- Clade: Pancrustacea
- Class: Insecta
- Order: Lepidoptera
- Family: Gracillariidae
- Genus: Caloptilia
- Species: C. insolita

Binomial name
- Caloptilia insolita Triberti, 1989

Species of moth

Caloptilia insolita is a moth of the family Gracillariidae. It is known from Nigeria.
