= Caloptilia sapiivora =

Scientific classification
- Kingdom: Animalia
- Phylum: Arthropoda
- Class: Insecta
- Order: Lepidoptera
- Family: Gracillariidae
- Genus: Caloptilia
- Species: C. sapiivora

Binomial name
- Caloptilia sapiivora Kumata, 1982

Species of moth

Caloptilia sapiivora is a moth of the family Gracillariidae. It is known from the islands of Honshū, Kyūshū and Shikoku in Japan.

The wingspan is 11.2-12.2 mm.

The larvae feed on Sapium japonicum. They mine the leaves of their host plant.
