= Caloptilia iophanes =

Scientific classification
- Kingdom: Animalia
- Phylum: Arthropoda
- Class: Insecta
- Order: Lepidoptera
- Family: Gracillariidae
- Genus: Caloptilia
- Species: C. iophanes

Binomial name
- Caloptilia iophanes (Meyrick, 1912)

Synonyms
- Gracilaria iophanes Meyrick, 1912

Species of moth

Caloptilia iophanes is a moth of the family Gracillariidae. It is known from Queensland, Australia.
