= Caloptilia plagata =

Scientific classification
- Kingdom: Animalia
- Phylum: Arthropoda
- Clade: Pancrustacea
- Class: Insecta
- Order: Lepidoptera
- Family: Gracillariidae
- Genus: Caloptilia
- Species: C. plagata

Binomial name
- Caloptilia plagata (Stainton, 1862)

Synonyms
- Gracilaria plagata Stainton, 1862

Species of moth

Caloptilia plagata is a moth of the family Gracillariidae. It is known from Queensland and the Northern Territory, Australia.
