= Caloptilia mutilata =

Scientific classification
- Kingdom: Animalia
- Phylum: Arthropoda
- Class: Insecta
- Order: Lepidoptera
- Family: Gracillariidae
- Genus: Caloptilia
- Species: C. mutilata

Binomial name
- Caloptilia mutilata (Staudinger, 1880)

Species of moth

Caloptilia mutilata is a moth of the family Gracillariidae. It is known from Turkey.
