= Caloptilia camaronae =

Scientific classification
- Domain: Eukaryota
- Kingdom: Animalia
- Phylum: Arthropoda
- Class: Insecta
- Order: Lepidoptera
- Family: Gracillariidae
- Genus: Caloptilia
- Species: C. camaronae

Binomial name
- Caloptilia camaronae (Zeller, 1877)

Species of moth

Caloptilia camaronae is a moth of the family Gracillariidae. It is known from Colombia.

The larvae feed on Uva camarona. They mine the leaves of their host plant.
