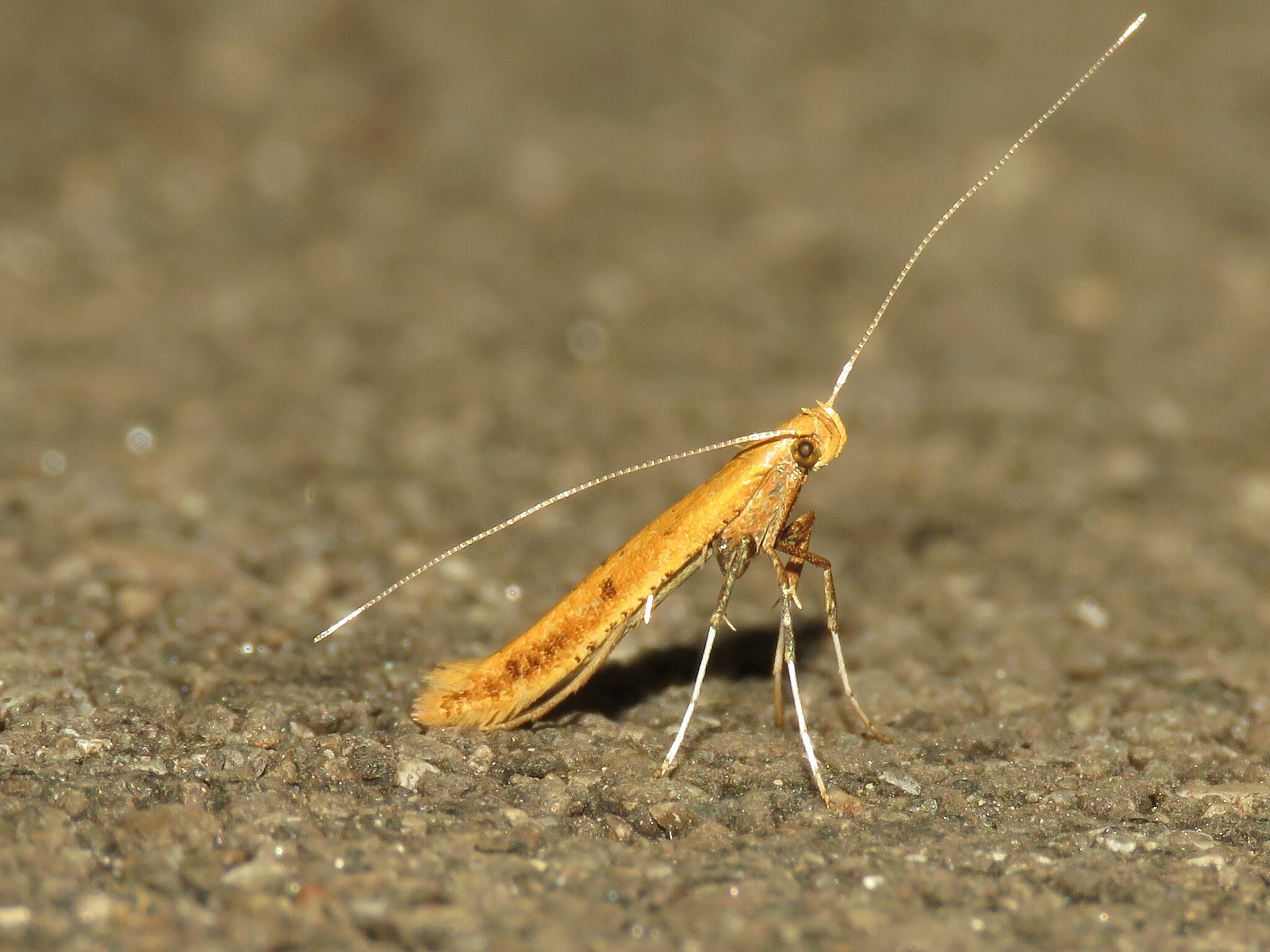

Scientific classification
- Kingdom: Animalia
- Phylum: Arthropoda
- Clade: Pancrustacea
- Class: Insecta
- Order: Lepidoptera
- Family: Gracillariidae
- Genus: Caloptilia
- Species: C. alnicolella

Binomial name
- Caloptilia alnicolella (Chambers, 1875)

= Caloptilia alnicolella =

Species of moth

Caloptilia alnicolella is a species of moth in the family Gracillariidae. It is known from Canada (Quebec) and the United States (Colorado and Maine).

The larvae feed on Alnus species. They mine the leaves of their host plant. The mine starts as a small, tentiform mine on the underside of the leaf. Later, the tip of a leaf is rolled downward.
