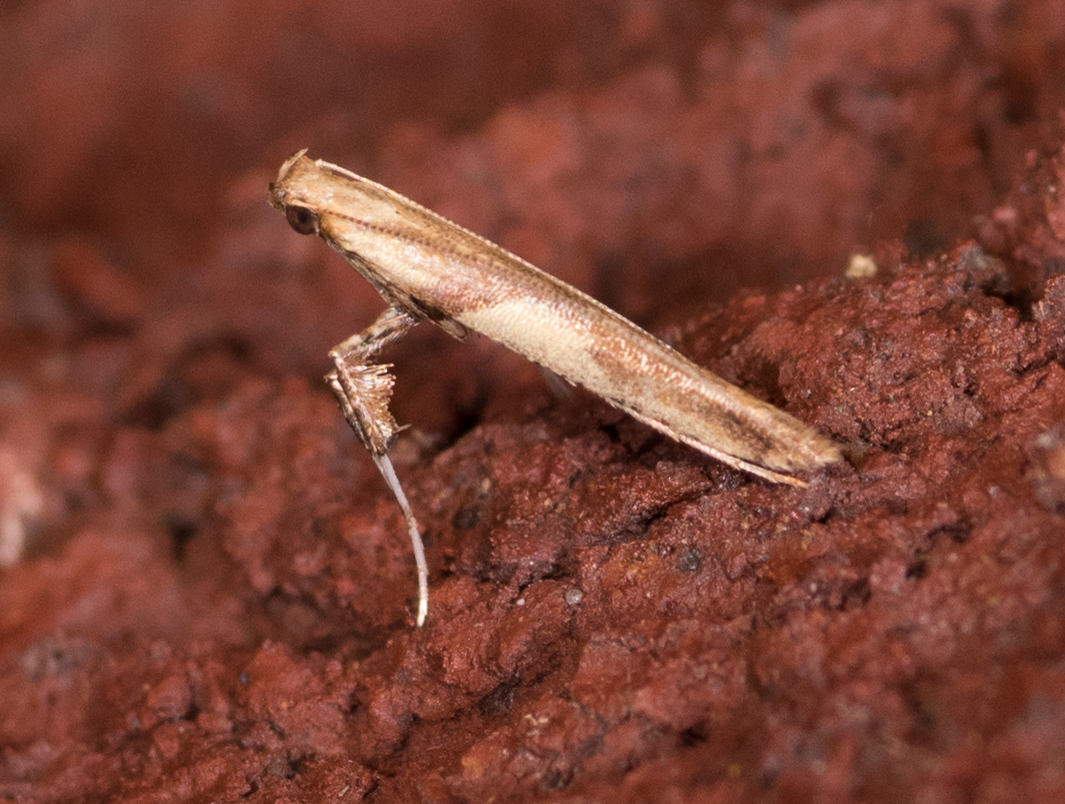

Scientific classification
- Kingdom: Animalia
- Phylum: Arthropoda
- Clade: Pancrustacea
- Class: Insecta
- Order: Lepidoptera
- Family: Gracillariidae
- Genus: Caloptilia
- Species: C. negundella

Binomial name
- Caloptilia negundella (Chambers, 1876)

= Caloptilia negundella =

Boxelder leafroller

Species of moth

Caloptilia negundella, the boxelder leafroller, is a moth of the family Gracillariidae. The species was first described by Vactor Tousey Chambers in 1876. It is known from the Canadian province of Quebec and the US states of Colorado, Kentucky, New York, California, Maine, Ohio and Vermont.

The wingspan is about 13 mm.
