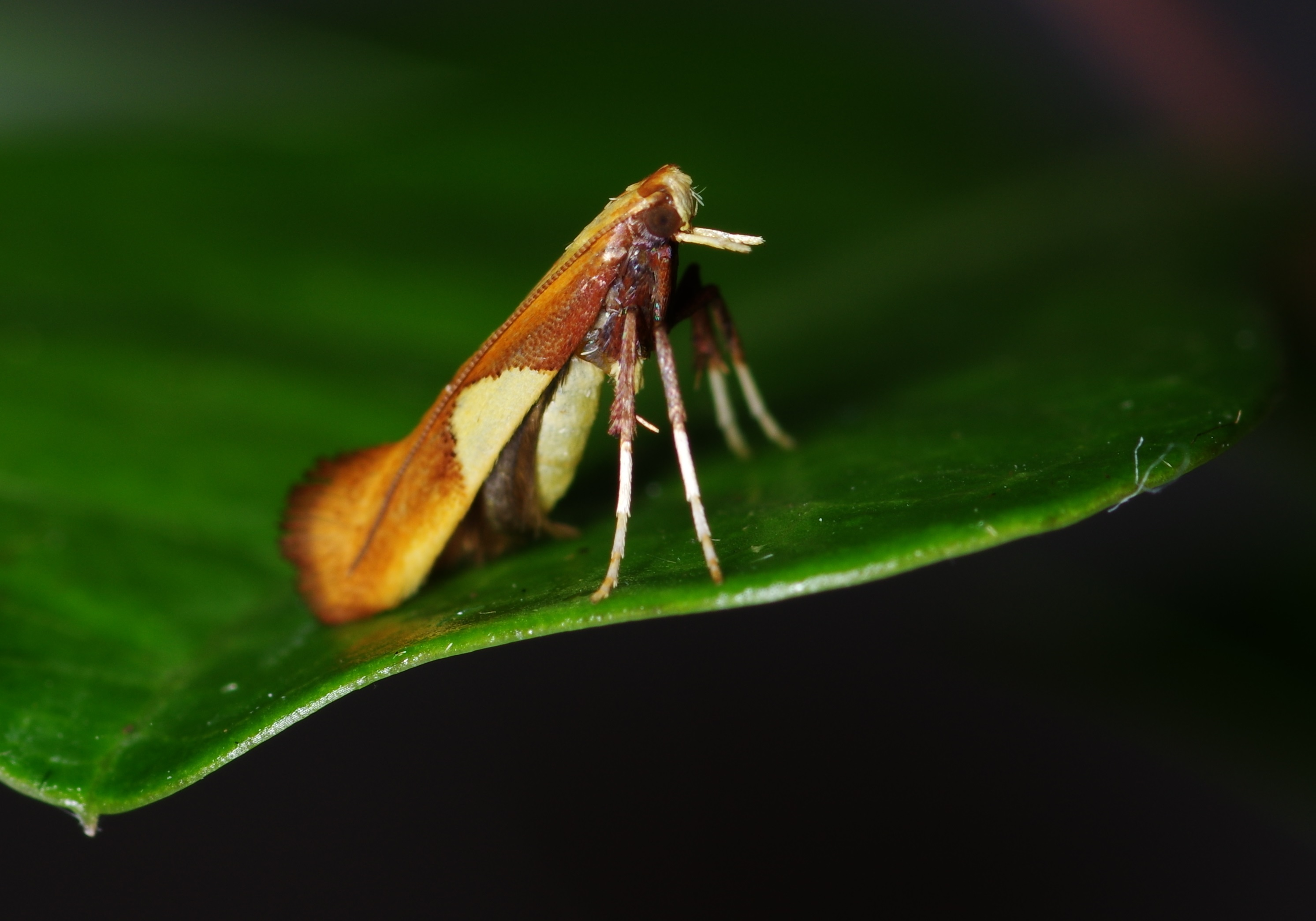

Scientific classification
- Kingdom: Animalia
- Phylum: Arthropoda
- Clade: Pancrustacea
- Class: Insecta
- Order: Lepidoptera
- Family: Gracillariidae
- Genus: Caloptilia
- Species: C. cecidophora

Binomial name
- Caloptilia cecidophora Kumata, 1966

= Caloptilia cecidophora =

Species of moth

Caloptilia cecidophora is a species of moth in the family Gracillariidae. It is known from Japan (Honshū, Kyūshū and the Ryukyu Islands) and Taiwan.

The wingspan is about 12 mm.

The larvae feed on Glochidion acuminatum, Glochidion obovatum, Glochidion rubrum. The first and second instar mine the leaves of their host plant along the vein.

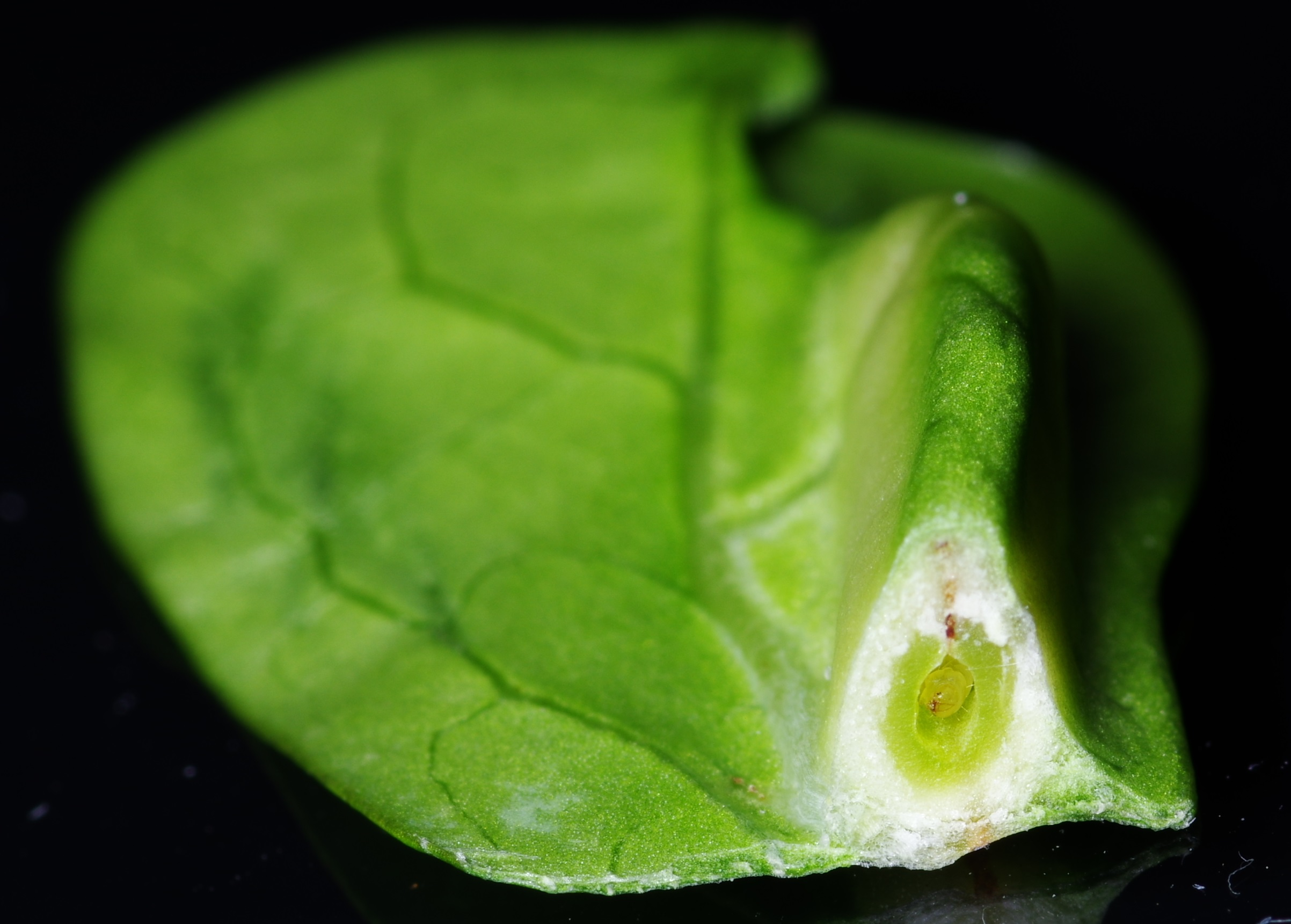
Cross section of the gall of Calotpilia cecidophora on Glochidion obovatum leaf, with the larva inside
