= Caloptilia eurycnema =

Scientific classification
- Kingdom: Animalia
- Phylum: Arthropoda
- Clade: Pancrustacea
- Class: Insecta
- Order: Lepidoptera
- Family: Gracillariidae
- Genus: Caloptilia
- Species: C. eurycnema

Binomial name
- Caloptilia eurycnema (Turner, 1894)

Synonyms
- Gracilaria eurycnema Turner, 1894

Species of moth

Caloptilia eurycnema is a moth of the family Gracillariidae. It is known from Queensland, Australia.
