= Caloptilia flavimaculella =

Scientific classification
- Domain: Eukaryota
- Kingdom: Animalia
- Phylum: Arthropoda
- Class: Insecta
- Order: Lepidoptera
- Family: Gracillariidae
- Genus: Caloptilia
- Species: C. flavimaculella

Binomial name
- Caloptilia flavimaculella (Ely, 1915)

Species of moth

Caloptilia flavimaculella is a moth of the family Gracillariidae. It is known from the United States (Connecticut and Maine).
