= Caloptilia bryonoma =

Scientific classification
- Domain: Eukaryota
- Kingdom: Animalia
- Phylum: Arthropoda
- Class: Insecta
- Order: Lepidoptera
- Family: Gracillariidae
- Genus: Caloptilia
- Species: C. bryonoma

Binomial name
- Caloptilia bryonoma (Turner, 1914)

Synonyms
- Cyphosticha bryonoma Turner, 1914

Species of moth

Caloptilia bryonoma is a moth of the family Gracillariidae. It is known from New South Wales, Australia.

The wingspan is about 10 mm.

The larvae feed on Nothofagus moorei. They probably mine the leaves of their host plant.
