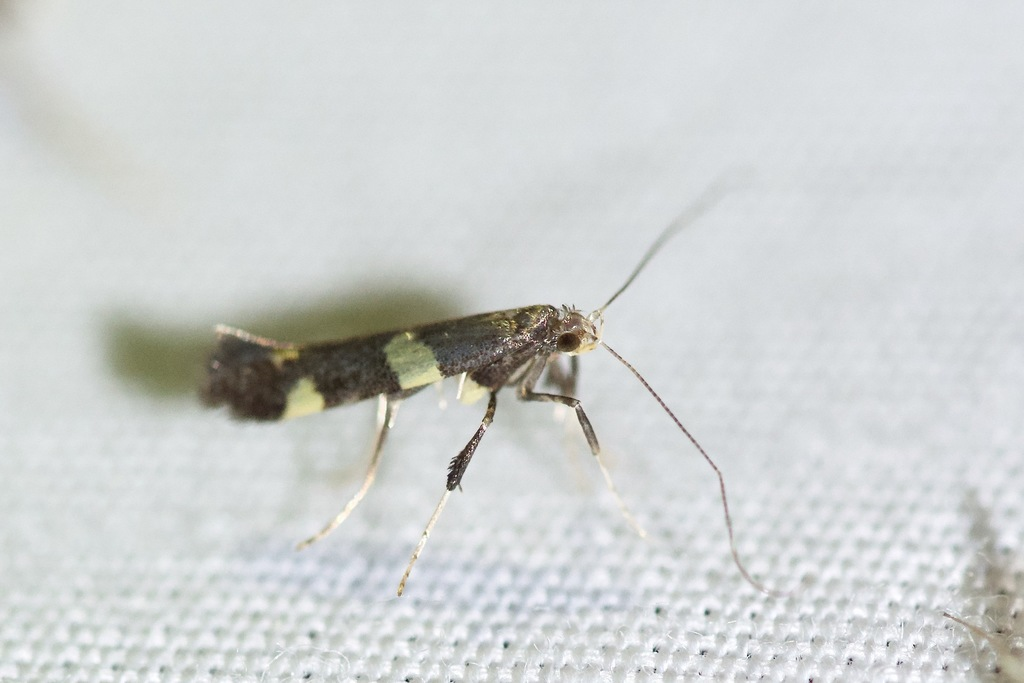

Scientific classification
- Kingdom: Animalia
- Phylum: Arthropoda
- Clade: Pancrustacea
- Class: Insecta
- Order: Lepidoptera
- Family: Gracillariidae
- Genus: Caloptilia
- Species: C. canadensisella

Binomial name
- Caloptilia canadensisella (McDunnough, 1956)

= Caloptilia canadensisella =

Species of moth

Caloptilia canadensisella is a moth of the family Gracillariidae. It is known from Canada (Nova Scotia and Québec).

The larvae feed on Cornus canadensis. They mine the leaves of their host plant.
