= Caloptilia schinusifolia =

Scientific classification
- Kingdom: Animalia
- Phylum: Arthropoda
- Clade: Pancrustacea
- Class: Insecta
- Order: Lepidoptera
- Family: Gracillariidae
- Genus: Caloptilia
- Species: C. schinusifolia

Binomial name
- Caloptilia schinusifolia Davis & Wheeler, 2011

Species of moth

Caloptilia schinusifolia is a moth of the family Gracillariidae. It is found in Rio de Janeiro, Brazil.

The larvae feed on Schinus terebinthifolius and Lithrea molleoides. They mine the leaves of their host plant.
