= Caloptilia aeolospila =

Scientific classification
- Kingdom: Animalia
- Phylum: Arthropoda
- Class: Insecta
- Order: Lepidoptera
- Family: Gracillariidae
- Genus: Caloptilia
- Species: C. aeolospila

Binomial name
- Caloptilia aeolospila (Meyrick, 1938)

Synonyms
- Gracilaria aeolospila Meyrick, 1938; Povolnya aeolospila (Meyrick, 1938); Caloptilia aeolopsila – Kumata, 1982

Species of moth

Caloptilia aeolospila or Povolnya aeolospila is a moth of the family Gracillariidae. It is known from China (Yunnan).
