= Caloptilia clastopetra =

Scientific classification
- Kingdom: Animalia
- Phylum: Arthropoda
- Class: Insecta
- Order: Lepidoptera
- Family: Gracillariidae
- Genus: Caloptilia
- Species: C. clastopetra

Binomial name
- Caloptilia clastopetra (Meyrick, 1928)

Synonyms
- Gracilaria clastopetra Meyrick, 1928

Species of moth

Caloptilia clastopetra is a moth of the family Gracillariidae. It is known from India (Karnataka and Maharashtra).

The larvae feed on Clerodendron infortunatum. They mine the leaves of their host plant.
