= Caloptilia acericolella =

Scientific classification
- Domain: Eukaryota
- Kingdom: Animalia
- Phylum: Arthropoda
- Class: Insecta
- Order: Lepidoptera
- Family: Gracillariidae
- Genus: Caloptilia
- Species: C. acericolella

Binomial name
- Caloptilia acericolella Kuznetzov, 1981

Species of moth

Caloptilia acericolella is a moth of the family Gracillariidae. It is known from Kazakhstan.

The larvae feed on Acer semenovii. They probably mine the leaves of their host plant.
