= Caloptilia corrugata =

Scientific classification
- Kingdom: Animalia
- Phylum: Arthropoda
- Class: Insecta
- Order: Lepidoptera
- Family: Gracillariidae
- Genus: Caloptilia
- Species: C. corrugata

Binomial name
- Caloptilia corrugata (Meyrick, 1918)

Synonyms
- Gracilaria corrugata Meyrick, 1918

Species of moth

Caloptilia corrugata is a moth of the family Gracillariidae. It is known from South Africa.
