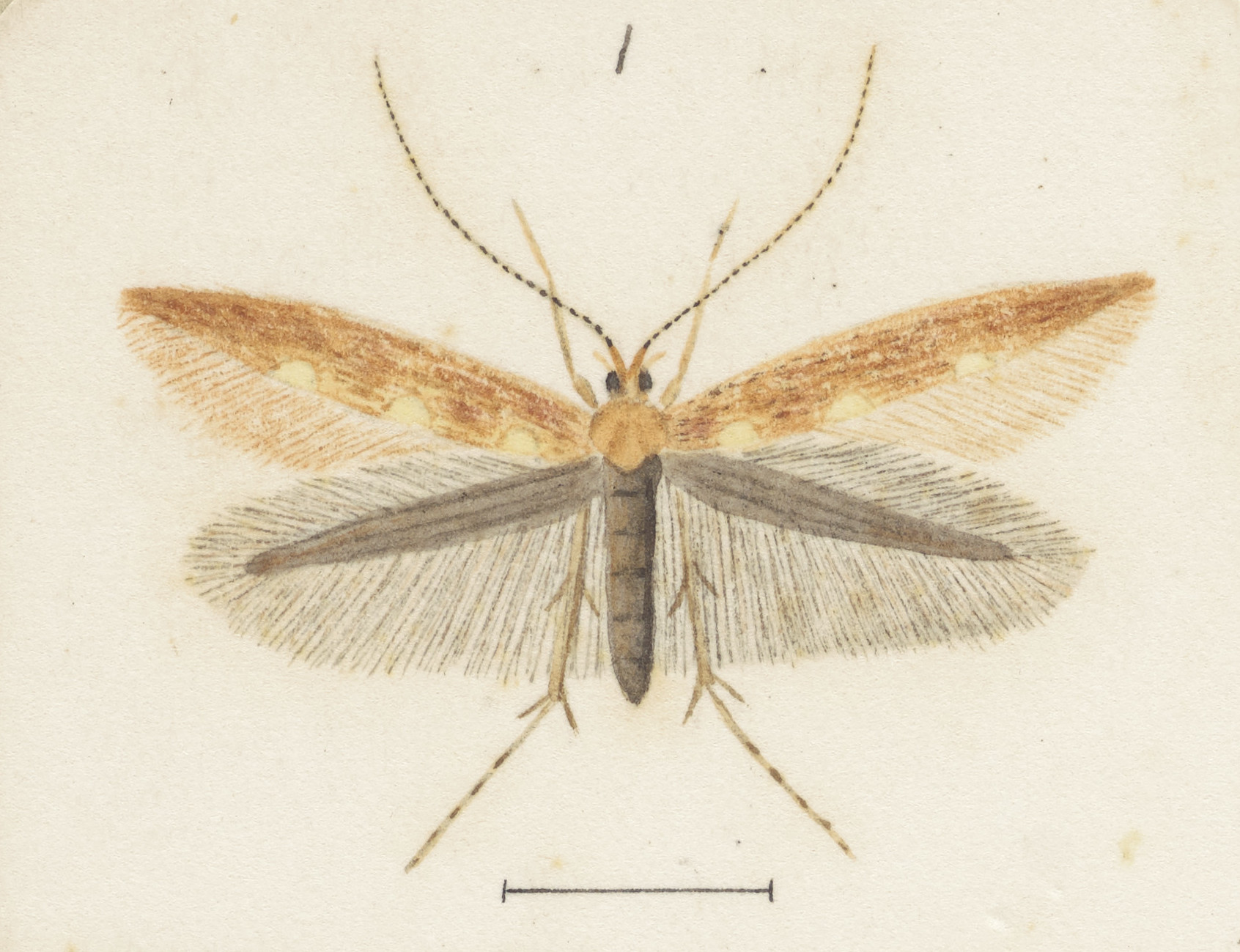
- Illustration of female

Scientific classification
- Kingdom: Animalia
- Phylum: Arthropoda
- Class: Insecta
- Order: Lepidoptera
- Family: Gracillariidae
- Genus: Caloptilia
- Species: C. selenitis

Binomial name
- Caloptilia selenitis (Meyrick, 1909)

Synonyms
- Gracilaria selenitis Meyrick, 1909

= Caloptilia selenitis =

Species of moth

Caloptilia selenitis is a moth of the family Gracillariidae. It is known from New Zealand.

The larvae mine the leaves of Lophozonia menziesii. The larvae form cocoons between the joined leaves of their host plant. The late instar larva of make a pouch of two or three terminal leaves on twigs. Pouches containing larvae are shed and fall to the ground in autumn while the larvae are still present.
