= Caloptilia albospersa =

Scientific classification
- Kingdom: Animalia
- Phylum: Arthropoda
- Clade: Pancrustacea
- Class: Insecta
- Order: Lepidoptera
- Family: Gracillariidae
- Genus: Caloptilia
- Species: C. albospersa

Binomial name
- Caloptilia albospersa (Turner, 1894)

Synonyms
- Gracilaria albospersa Turner, 1894; Gracilaria albispersa – Turner, 1896

Species of moth

Caloptilia albospersa is a moth of the family Gracillariidae. It is known from Queensland, Australia.
