= Caloptilia oriarcha =

Scientific classification
- Kingdom: Animalia
- Phylum: Arthropoda
- Class: Insecta
- Order: Lepidoptera
- Family: Gracillariidae
- Genus: Caloptilia
- Species: C. oriarcha

Binomial name
- Caloptilia oriarcha (Meyrick, 1915)

Species of moth

Caloptilia oriarcha is a moth of the family Gracillariidae. It is known from Peru.
