= Caloptilia crasiphila =

Scientific classification
- Kingdom: Animalia
- Phylum: Arthropoda
- Class: Insecta
- Order: Lepidoptera
- Family: Gracillariidae
- Genus: Caloptilia
- Species: C. crasiphila

Binomial name
- Caloptilia crasiphila (Meyrick, 1912)

Synonyms
- Gracilaria crasiphila Meyrick, 1912

Species of moth

Caloptilia crasiphila is a moth of the family Gracillariidae. It is known from the Northern Territory, Australia.
