= Caloptilia glyphidopis =

Scientific classification
- Kingdom: Animalia
- Phylum: Arthropoda
- Class: Insecta
- Order: Lepidoptera
- Family: Gracillariidae
- Genus: Caloptilia
- Species: C. glyphidopis

Binomial name
- Caloptilia glyphidopis (Meyrick, 1934)

Species of moth

Caloptilia glyphidopis is a moth of the family Gracillariidae. It is known from Fiji.
