= Caloptilia ptychospora =

Scientific classification
- Kingdom: Animalia
- Phylum: Arthropoda
- Class: Insecta
- Order: Lepidoptera
- Family: Gracillariidae
- Genus: Caloptilia
- Species: C. ptychospora

Binomial name
- Caloptilia ptychospora (Meyrick, 1938)

Synonyms
- Gracilaria ptychospora Meyrick, 1938

Species of moth

Caloptilia ptychospora is a moth of the family Gracillariidae. It is known from the Democratic Republic of Congo.
