= Caloptilia mastopis =

Scientific classification
- Kingdom: Animalia
- Phylum: Arthropoda
- Class: Insecta
- Order: Lepidoptera
- Family: Gracillariidae
- Genus: Caloptilia
- Species: C. mastopis

Binomial name
- Caloptilia mastopis (Meyrick, 1918)

Species of moth

Caloptilia mastopis is a moth of the family Gracillariidae. It is known from the states of Assam, Meghalaya and Maharashtra in India.

The larvae feed on Litsea stocksii. They mine the leaves of their host plant. The mine has the form of a narrow elongate blotch at the edge of a young leaf. It is found on the underside of the leaf.
