= Caloptilia trissochroa =

Scientific classification
- Kingdom: Animalia
- Phylum: Arthropoda
- Class: Insecta
- Order: Lepidoptera
- Family: Gracillariidae
- Genus: Caloptilia
- Species: C. trissochroa

Binomial name
- Caloptilia trissochroa (Meyrick, 1931)

Species of moth

Caloptilia trissochroa is a moth of the family Gracillariidae. It is known from Maharashtra, India.

The larvae feed on pepper-creeper.
