= Caloptilia acrotherma =

Scientific classification
- Kingdom: Animalia
- Phylum: Arthropoda
- Clade: Pancrustacea
- Class: Insecta
- Order: Lepidoptera
- Family: Gracillariidae
- Genus: Caloptilia
- Species: C. acrotherma

Binomial name
- Caloptilia acrotherma (Meyrick, 1908)

Species of moth

Caloptilia acrotherma is a moth of the family Gracillariidae. It is known from Indonesia (Java) and Sri Lanka.

The larvae feed on Atylosia candollei and Cajanus cajan. They probably mine the leaves of their host plant.
