= Caloptilia verecunda =

Scientific classification
- Kingdom: Animalia
- Phylum: Arthropoda
- Clade: Pancrustacea
- Class: Insecta
- Order: Lepidoptera
- Family: Gracillariidae
- Genus: Caloptilia
- Species: C. verecunda

Binomial name
- Caloptilia verecunda Triberti, 2004

Species of moth

Caloptilia verecunda is a moth of the family Gracillariidae. It is known from Namibia.
