= Caloptilia camphorae =

Camphor leaf miner

Scientific classification
- Kingdom: Animalia
- Phylum: Arthropoda
- Class: Insecta
- Order: Lepidoptera
- Family: Gracillariidae
- Genus: Caloptilia
- Species: C. camphorae

Binomial name
- Caloptilia camphorae Kumata, 1982

Species of moth

Caloptilia camphorae (camphor leaf miner) is a moth of the family Gracillariidae. It is known from Japan (Honshū, Kyūshū, the Ryukyu Islands).

Their wingspan is 8–10 mm.

The larvae feed on Actinodaphne lancifolia, Cinnamomum camphora, Lindera praecox, and Litsea coreana. They mine the leaves of their host plant.
