= Caloptilia leptophanes =

Scientific classification
- Kingdom: Animalia
- Phylum: Arthropoda
- Class: Insecta
- Order: Lepidoptera
- Family: Gracillariidae
- Genus: Caloptilia
- Species: C. leptophanes

Binomial name
- Caloptilia leptophanes (Meyrick, 1918)

Synonyms
- Gracilaria leptophanes Meyrick, 1918

Species of moth

Caloptilia leptophanes is a moth of the family Gracillariidae. It is known from Nigeria and South Africa.

The wingspan is about 10 mm. The forewings are dark iridescent purple with five slender shining whitish-yellow transverse fasciae, the first towards the base, irregular, the second at one-third, strongest, rather oblique, the third postmedian, direct, the fourth at three-fourths, reduced to slight irroration and the fifth towards the apex, attenuated beneath. There is a whitish-yellow apical speck. The hindwings are dark grey.
