= Caloptilia sphenocrossa =

Scientific classification
- Kingdom: Animalia
- Phylum: Arthropoda
- Class: Insecta
- Order: Lepidoptera
- Family: Gracillariidae
- Genus: Caloptilia
- Species: C. sphenocrossa

Binomial name
- Caloptilia sphenocrossa (Meyrick, 1934)

Species of moth

Caloptilia sphenocrossa is a moth of the family Gracillariidae. It is known from Java, Indonesia and Pahang, Malaysia.

The larvae feed on Cajanus cajan. They mine the leaves of their host plant.
