= Caloptilia vibrans =

Scientific classification
- Kingdom: Animalia
- Phylum: Arthropoda
- Class: Insecta
- Order: Lepidoptera
- Family: Gracillariidae
- Genus: Caloptilia
- Species: C. vibrans

Binomial name
- Caloptilia vibrans (Meyrick, 1918)

Synonyms
- Gracilaria vibrans Meyrick, 1918

Species of moth

Caloptilia vibrans is a moth of the family Gracillariidae. It is known from South Africa.

The larvae feed on Clerodendron glabrum. They mine the leaves of their host plant.
