= Caloptilia emas =

Scientific classification
- Domain: Eukaryota
- Kingdom: Animalia
- Phylum: Arthropoda
- Class: Insecta
- Order: Lepidoptera
- Family: Gracillariidae
- Genus: Caloptilia
- Species: C. emas

Binomial name
- Caloptilia emas Yuan & Robinson, 1993

Species of moth

Caloptilia emas is a moth of the family Gracillariidae. It is known from Malaysia (Pahang).
