= Caloptilia pekinensis =

Scientific classification
- Domain: Eukaryota
- Kingdom: Animalia
- Phylum: Arthropoda
- Class: Insecta
- Order: Lepidoptera
- Family: Gracillariidae
- Genus: Caloptilia
- Species: C. pekinensis

Binomial name
- Caloptilia pekinensis Liu & Yuan, 1990

Species of moth

Caloptilia pekinensis is a moth of the family Gracillariidae. It is known from Beijing, China.
