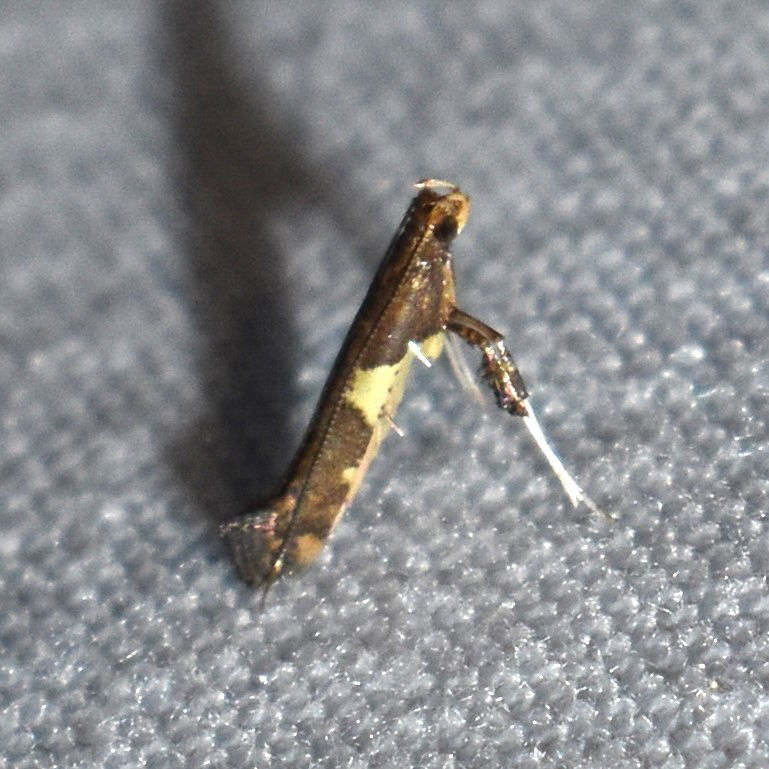

Scientific classification
- Kingdom: Animalia
- Phylum: Arthropoda
- Clade: Pancrustacea
- Class: Insecta
- Order: Lepidoptera
- Family: Gracillariidae
- Genus: Caloptilia
- Species: C. umbratella

Binomial name
- Caloptilia umbratella (Braun, 1927)

= Caloptilia umbratella =

Species of moth

Caloptilia umbratella is a moth of the family Gracillariidae. It is known from Ontario and Québec in Canada and Kentucky and Virginia in the United States.

There are probably two generations per year.

The larvae feed on Acer rubrum and Acer saccharum. They mine the leaves of their host plant.
