= Caloptilia ostracodes =

Scientific classification
- Domain: Eukaryota
- Kingdom: Animalia
- Phylum: Arthropoda
- Class: Insecta
- Order: Lepidoptera
- Family: Gracillariidae
- Genus: Caloptilia
- Species: C. ostracodes

Binomial name
- Caloptilia ostracodes (Turner, 1917)

Synonyms
- Cyphostica ostracodes Turner, 1917; Cyphostica zophonota Turner, 1927

Species of moth

Caloptilia ostracodes is a moth of the family Gracillariidae. It is known from Tasmania, Australia.

The larvae feed on Nothofagus cunninghamii.
