= Caloptilia semiclausa =

Scientific classification
- Kingdom: Animalia
- Phylum: Arthropoda
- Class: Insecta
- Order: Lepidoptera
- Family: Gracillariidae
- Genus: Caloptilia
- Species: C. semiclausa

Binomial name
- Caloptilia semiclausa (Meyrick, 1921)

Species of moth

Caloptilia semiclausa is a moth of the family Gracillariidae. It is known from Brazil.
