= Caloptilia deltosticta =

Scientific classification
- Kingdom: Animalia
- Phylum: Arthropoda
- Clade: Pancrustacea
- Class: Insecta
- Order: Lepidoptera
- Family: Gracillariidae
- Genus: Caloptilia
- Species: C. deltosticta

Binomial name
- Caloptilia deltosticta (Meyrick, 1933)

Synonyms
- Gracilaria deltosticta Meyrick, 1933

Species of moth

Caloptilia deltosticta is a moth of the family Gracillariidae. It is known from India (Jammu and Kashmir). The type series was collected at 2,700 m (8,800 ft) above sea level.

The wingspan is 11–12 mm (0.43–0.47 in).
