= Caloptilia dubatolovi =

Scientific classification
- Domain: Eukaryota
- Kingdom: Animalia
- Phylum: Arthropoda
- Class: Insecta
- Order: Lepidoptera
- Family: Gracillariidae
- Genus: Caloptilia
- Species: C. dubatolovi

Binomial name
- Caloptilia dubatolovi Baryshnikova, 2007

Species of moth

Caloptilia dubatolovi is a moth of the family Gracillariidae. It is known from the Russian Far East.
