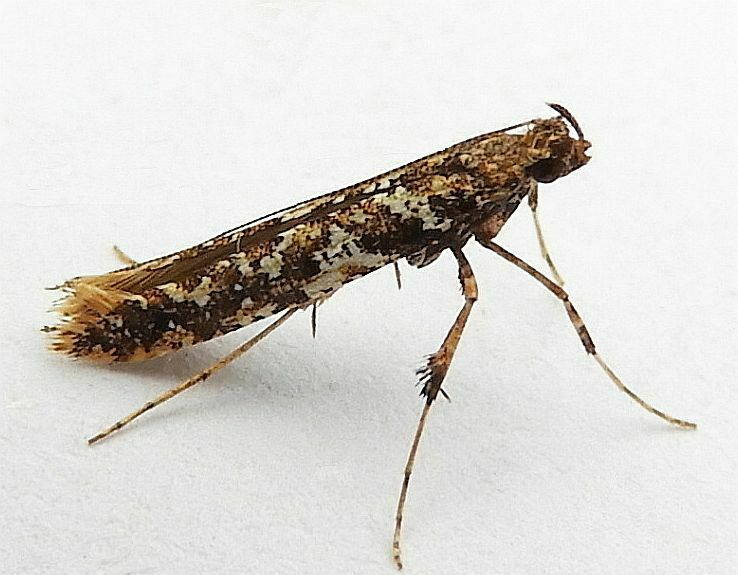

Scientific classification
- Kingdom: Animalia
- Phylum: Arthropoda
- Clade: Pancrustacea
- Class: Insecta
- Order: Lepidoptera
- Family: Gracillariidae
- Genus: Caloptilia
- Species: C. serotinella

Binomial name
- Caloptilia serotinella Ely, 1910

= Caloptilia serotinella =

Cherry leaf roller

Species of moth

Caloptilia serotinella (cherry leaf roller) is a moth of the family Gracillariidae, found in North America.

The caterpillar generates the force required to roll leaves by stretching the silk strands it fixes between opposable plant surfaces. It communicates with other cherry leaf rollers by scraping, plucking and vibrating.
