= Caloptilia chloroptila =

Scientific classification
- Kingdom: Animalia
- Phylum: Arthropoda
- Class: Insecta
- Order: Lepidoptera
- Family: Gracillariidae
- Genus: Caloptilia
- Species: C. chloroptila

Binomial name
- Caloptilia chloroptila (Meyrick, 1915)

Species of moth

Caloptilia chloroptila is a moth of the family Gracillariidae. It is known from Guyana.
