= Caloptilia phalaropa =

Scientific classification
- Kingdom: Animalia
- Phylum: Arthropoda
- Class: Insecta
- Order: Lepidoptera
- Family: Gracillariidae
- Genus: Caloptilia
- Species: C. phalaropa

Binomial name
- Caloptilia phalaropa (Meyrick, 1912)

Species of moth

Caloptilia phalaropa is a moth of the family Gracillariidae. It is known from Sri Lanka.
