= Caloptilia anthobaphes =

Scientific classification
- Kingdom: Animalia
- Phylum: Arthropoda
- Class: Insecta
- Order: Lepidoptera
- Family: Gracillariidae
- Genus: Caloptilia
- Species: C. anthobaphes

Binomial name
- Caloptilia anthobaphes (Meyrick, 1921)

Species of moth

Caloptilia anthobaphes is a moth of the family Gracillariidae. It is known from eastern Canada (Nova Scotia, Ontario, Québec) and the United States (Michigan and Vermont).

The larvae feed on Vaccinium species, including Vaccinium ovatum. They mine the leaves of their host plant.
