= Caloptilia tirantella =

Scientific classification
- Domain: Eukaryota
- Kingdom: Animalia
- Phylum: Arthropoda
- Class: Insecta
- Order: Lepidoptera
- Family: Gracillariidae
- Genus: Caloptilia
- Species: C. tirantella

Binomial name
- Caloptilia tirantella Legrand, 1965

Species of moth

Caloptilia tirantella is a moth of the family Gracillariidae. It is known from the Seychelles.
