= Caloptilia megalotis =

Scientific classification
- Kingdom: Animalia
- Phylum: Arthropoda
- Class: Insecta
- Order: Lepidoptera
- Family: Gracillariidae
- Genus: Caloptilia
- Species: C. megalotis

Binomial name
- Caloptilia megalotis (Meyrick, 1908)

Synonyms
- Gracilaria megalotis Meyrick, 1908

Species of moth

Caloptilia megalotis is a moth of the family Gracillariidae. It is known from New South Wales, Australia and Meghalaya, India.
