= Caloptilia iridophanes =

Scientific classification
- Kingdom: Animalia
- Phylum: Arthropoda
- Class: Insecta
- Order: Lepidoptera
- Family: Gracillariidae
- Genus: Caloptilia
- Species: C. iridophanes

Binomial name
- Caloptilia iridophanes (Meyrick, 1935)

Species of moth

Caloptilia iridophanes is a moth of the family Gracillariidae. It is known from Maharashtra, India.

The larvae feed on Buchanania lanzan. They mine the leaves of their host plant.
