= Caloptilia chlorella =

Scientific classification
- Kingdom: Animalia
- Phylum: Arthropoda
- Clade: Pancrustacea
- Class: Insecta
- Order: Lepidoptera
- Family: Gracillariidae
- Genus: Caloptilia
- Species: C. chlorella

Binomial name
- Caloptilia chlorella (Turner, 1894)

Synonyms
- Gracilaria chlorella Turner, 1894

Species of moth

Caloptilia chlorella is a moth of the family Gracillariidae. It is known from Queensland, Australia.
