= Caloptilia acinata =

Scientific classification
- Domain: Eukaryota
- Kingdom: Animalia
- Phylum: Arthropoda
- Class: Insecta
- Order: Lepidoptera
- Family: Gracillariidae
- Genus: Caloptilia
- Species: C. acinata

Binomial name
- Caloptilia acinata Yuan & Robinson, 1993

Species of moth

Caloptilia acinata is a moth of the family Gracillariidae. It is known from India and Thailand.
