= Caloptilia semnophanes =

Scientific classification
- Domain: Eukaryota
- Kingdom: Animalia
- Phylum: Arthropoda
- Class: Insecta
- Order: Lepidoptera
- Family: Gracillariidae
- Genus: Caloptilia
- Species: C. semnophanes

Binomial name
- Caloptilia semnophanes (Meyrick, 1918)

Synonyms
- Gracilaria semnophanes Meyrick, 1918

Species of spider

Caloptilia semnophanes is a moth of the family Gracillariidae. It is known from South Africa.
