= Caloptilia sapina =

Scientific classification
- Kingdom: Animalia
- Phylum: Arthropoda
- Class: Insecta
- Order: Lepidoptera
- Family: Gracillariidae
- Genus: Caloptilia
- Species: C. sapina

Binomial name
- Caloptilia sapina (Vári, 1961)

Synonyms
- Sphyrophora sapina Vári, 1961

Species of moth

Caloptilia sapina is a moth of the family Gracillariidae. It is known from Namibia and South Africa.

The larvae feed on Sapium ellipticum. They mine the leaves of their host plant.
