= Caloptilia dicksoni =

Scientific classification
- Kingdom: Animalia
- Phylum: Arthropoda
- Class: Insecta
- Order: Lepidoptera
- Family: Gracillariidae
- Genus: Caloptilia
- Species: C. dicksoni

Binomial name
- Caloptilia dicksoni Vári, 1961

Species of moth

Caloptilia dicksoni is a moth of the family Gracillariidae. It is known from South Africa.
