= Caloptilia acerivorella =

Scientific classification
- Domain: Eukaryota
- Kingdom: Animalia
- Phylum: Arthropoda
- Class: Insecta
- Order: Lepidoptera
- Family: Gracillariidae
- Genus: Caloptilia
- Species: C. acerivorella

Binomial name
- Caloptilia acerivorella (Kuznetzov, 1956)

Species of moth

Caloptilia acerivorella is a moth of the family Gracillariidae. It is known from Croatia, Tajikistan and Turkmenistan.

The larvae feed on Acer regeli and Acer turcomanicum. They mine the leaves of their host plant.
