= Caloptilia auchetidella =

Scientific classification
- Kingdom: Animalia
- Phylum: Arthropoda
- Class: Insecta
- Order: Lepidoptera
- Family: Gracillariidae
- Genus: Caloptilia
- Species: C. auchetidella

Binomial name
- Caloptilia auchetidella (Meyrick, 1880)

Synonyms
- Gracilaria auchetidella Meyrick, 1880

Species of moth

Caloptilia auchetidella is a moth of the family Gracillariidae. It is known from New South Wales, Australia.
