= Caloptilia cirrhopis =

Scientific classification
- Domain: Eukaryota
- Kingdom: Animalia
- Phylum: Arthropoda
- Class: Insecta
- Order: Lepidoptera
- Family: Gracillariidae
- Genus: Caloptilia
- Species: C. cirrhopis

Binomial name
- Caloptilia cirrhopis (Meyrick, 1907)

Synonyms
- Gracilaria cirrhopis Meyrick, 1907

Species of moth

Caloptilia cirrhopis is a moth of the family Gracillariidae. It is known from Tasmania, Australia.

The forewing length is 9 mm (0.35 in) in the holotype, a male.
