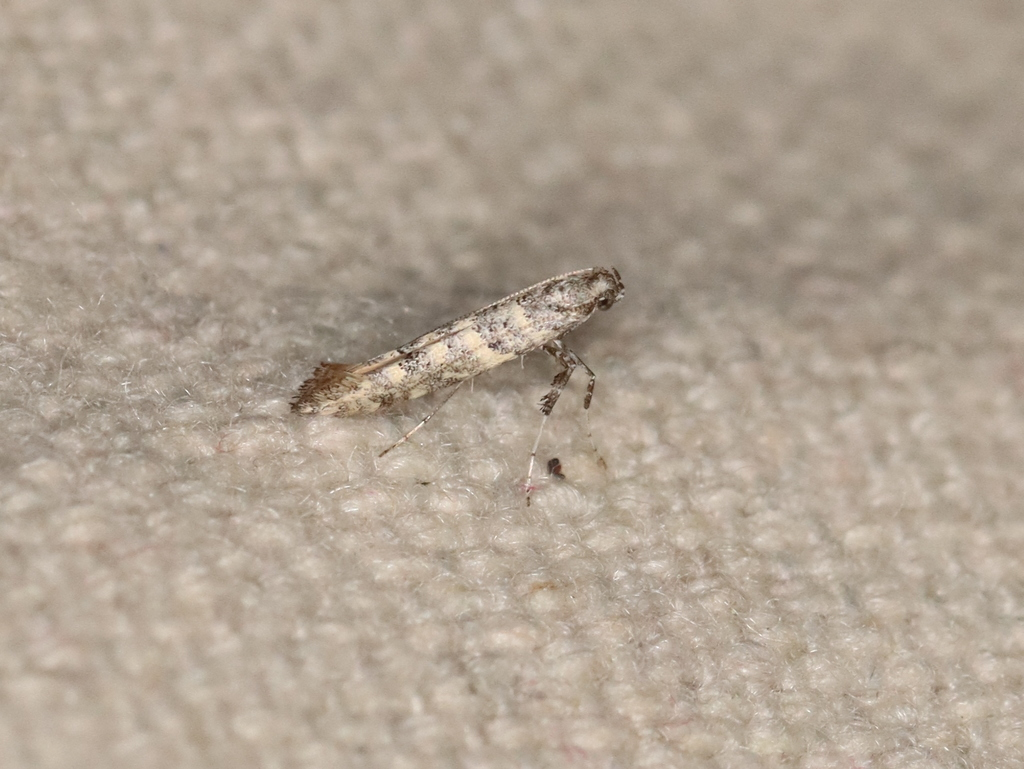

Scientific classification
- Kingdom: Animalia
- Phylum: Arthropoda
- Clade: Pancrustacea
- Class: Insecta
- Order: Lepidoptera
- Family: Gracillariidae
- Genus: Caloptilia
- Species: C. atomosella

Binomial name
- Caloptilia atomosella (Zeller, 1873)

Synonyms
- Caloptilia atmosella Ely, 1918

= Caloptilia atomosella =

Species of moth

Caloptilia atomosella is a moth of the family Gracillariidae. It is known from the United States (the Atlantic States, New Mexico, Louisiana, Alabama, and Texas).
