= Caloptilia eurythiota =

Scientific classification
- Domain: Eukaryota
- Kingdom: Animalia
- Phylum: Arthropoda
- Class: Insecta
- Order: Lepidoptera
- Family: Gracillariidae
- Genus: Caloptilia
- Species: C. eurythiota

Binomial name
- Caloptilia eurythiota (Turner, 1913)

Synonyms
- Gracilaria eurythiota Turner, 1913

Species of moth

Caloptilia eurythiota is a moth of the family Gracillariidae. It is known from Queensland, Australia.
