= Caloptilia hercoscelis =

Scientific classification
- Kingdom: Animalia
- Phylum: Arthropoda
- Class: Insecta
- Order: Lepidoptera
- Family: Gracillariidae
- Genus: Caloptilia
- Species: C. hercoscelis

Binomial name
- Caloptilia hercoscelis (Meyrick, 1939)

Species of moth

Caloptilia hercoscelis is a moth of the family Gracillariidae that is known from Fiji.
