= Caloptilia gladiatrix =

Scientific classification
- Kingdom: Animalia
- Phylum: Arthropoda
- Class: Insecta
- Order: Lepidoptera
- Family: Gracillariidae
- Genus: Caloptilia
- Species: C. gladiatrix

Binomial name
- Caloptilia gladiatrix (Meyrick, 1922)

Species of moth

Caloptilia gladiatrix is a moth of the family Gracillariidae. It is known from China (Shanghai).
