= Caloptilia oxydelta =

Scientific classification
- Kingdom: Animalia
- Phylum: Arthropoda
- Clade: Pancrustacea
- Class: Insecta
- Order: Lepidoptera
- Family: Gracillariidae
- Genus: Caloptilia
- Species: C. oxydelta

Binomial name
- Caloptilia oxydelta (Meyrick, 1908)

Synonyms
- Caloptilia oxydella (de Joannis, 1930)

Species of moth

Caloptilia oxydelta is a moth of the family Gracillariidae. It is known from Karnataka, India; Java, Indonesia; and Vietnam.

The larvae feed on Flueggia acidoton and Flueggia virosa. They mine the leaves of their host plant.
