= Caloptilia kurokoi =

Scientific classification
- Kingdom: Animalia
- Phylum: Arthropoda
- Class: Insecta
- Order: Lepidoptera
- Family: Gracillariidae
- Genus: Caloptilia
- Species: C. kurokoi

Binomial name
- Caloptilia kurokoi Kumata, 1966

Species of moth

Caloptilia kurokoi is a moth of the family Gracillariidae. It is known from China and Kyūshū, Japan.

The wingspan is about 15.5 mm.

The larvae feed on Acer rufinerve. They probably mine the leaves of their host plant.
