= Caloptilia immuricata =

Scientific classification
- Kingdom: Animalia
- Phylum: Arthropoda
- Clade: Pancrustacea
- Class: Insecta
- Order: Lepidoptera
- Family: Gracillariidae
- Genus: Caloptilia
- Species: C. immuricata

Binomial name
- Caloptilia immuricata (Meyrick, 1915)

Species of moth

Caloptilia immuricata is a moth of the family Gracillariidae. It is known from Ecuador and Peru.
