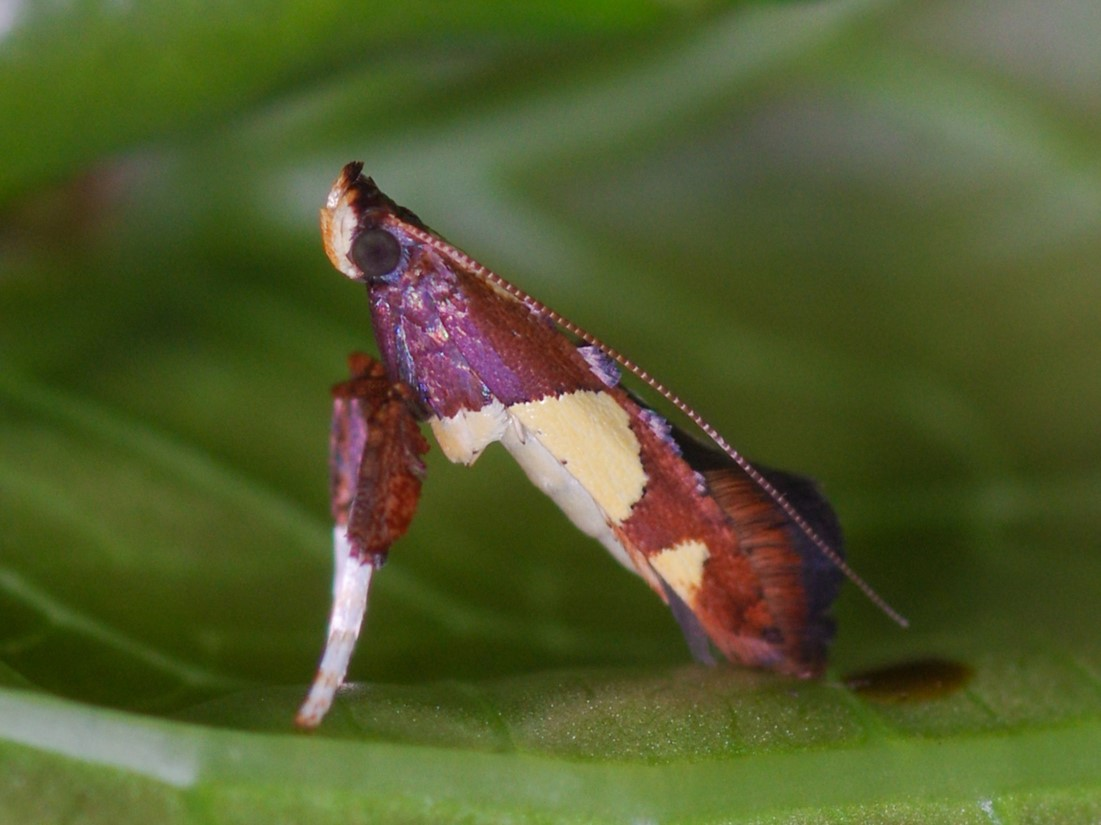

Scientific classification
- Kingdom: Animalia
- Phylum: Arthropoda
- Clade: Pancrustacea
- Class: Insecta
- Order: Lepidoptera
- Family: Gracillariidae
- Genus: Caloptilia
- Species: C. ryukyuensis

Binomial name
- Caloptilia ryukyuensis Kumata, 1966

= Caloptilia ryukyuensis =

Species of moth

Caloptilia ryukyuensis is a species of moth in the family Gracillariidae. It is known from the Ryukyu Islands of Japan.

The wingspan is about 12 mm.

The larvae feed on Phyllanthus obliquus. They probably mine the leaves of their host plant.
