= Caloptilia macranthes =

Scientific classification
- Kingdom: Animalia
- Phylum: Arthropoda
- Class: Insecta
- Order: Lepidoptera
- Family: Gracillariidae
- Genus: Caloptilia
- Species: C. macranthes

Binomial name
- Caloptilia macranthes (Meyrick, 1928)

Species of moth

Caloptilia macranthes is a moth of the family Gracillariidae. It is known from Texas, United States.
