= Caloptilia rhusina =

Scientific classification
- Kingdom: Animalia
- Phylum: Arthropoda
- Class: Insecta
- Order: Lepidoptera
- Family: Gracillariidae
- Genus: Caloptilia
- Species: C. rhusina

Binomial name
- Caloptilia rhusina Vári, 1961

Species of moth

Caloptilia rhusina is a moth of the family Gracillariidae. It is known from South Africa.

The larvae feed on Rhus lucida. They probably mine the leaves of their host plant.
