= Caloptilia ischiastris =

Scientific classification
- Kingdom: Animalia
- Phylum: Arthropoda
- Clade: Pancrustacea
- Class: Insecta
- Order: Lepidoptera
- Family: Gracillariidae
- Genus: Caloptilia
- Species: C. ischiastris

Binomial name
- Caloptilia ischiastris (Meyrick, 1907)

Synonyms
- Gracilaria ischiastris Meyrick, 1907; Caloptilia ischiatris [misspelling]

Species of moth

Caloptilia ischiastris is a moth of the family Gracillariidae. It is known from New South Wales, Australia.

The forewing length is 8 mm (0.31 in) in the holotype (male).
