= Caloptilia nobilella =

Scientific classification
- Kingdom: Animalia
- Phylum: Arthropoda
- Clade: Pancrustacea
- Class: Insecta
- Order: Lepidoptera
- Family: Gracillariidae
- Genus: Caloptilia
- Species: C. nobilella

Binomial name
- Caloptilia nobilella (Klimesch, 1942)

Synonyms
- Gracilaria nobilella Klimesch, 1942; Caloptilia nobilis

Species of moth

Caloptilia nobilella is a moth of the family Gracillariidae. It is found in Macedonia and the Istria peninsula in the Adriatic Sea.

The larvae feed on Laurus nobilis. They mine the leaves of their host plant.
