= Caloptilia thymophanes =

Scientific classification
- Kingdom: Animalia
- Phylum: Arthropoda
- Class: Insecta
- Order: Lepidoptera
- Family: Gracillariidae
- Genus: Caloptilia
- Species: C. thymophanes

Binomial name
- Caloptilia thymophanes (Meyrick, 1928)

Species of moth

Caloptilia thymophanes is a moth of the family Gracillariidae. It is known from Bihar, India.

The larvae feed on Lannea coromandelica and Odina wodier. They mine the leaves of their host plant.
