= Caloptilia peltophanes =

Scientific classification
- Kingdom: Animalia
- Phylum: Arthropoda
- Clade: Pancrustacea
- Class: Insecta
- Order: Lepidoptera
- Family: Gracillariidae
- Genus: Caloptilia
- Species: C. peltophanes

Binomial name
- Caloptilia peltophanes (Meyrick, 1907)

Synonyms
- Gracilaria peltophanes Meyrick, 1907

Species of moth

Caloptilia peltophanes is a moth of the family Gracillariidae. It is known from Queensland, Australia.

The forewing length is 8 mm (0.31 in) in the type series consisting of a male and a female.
