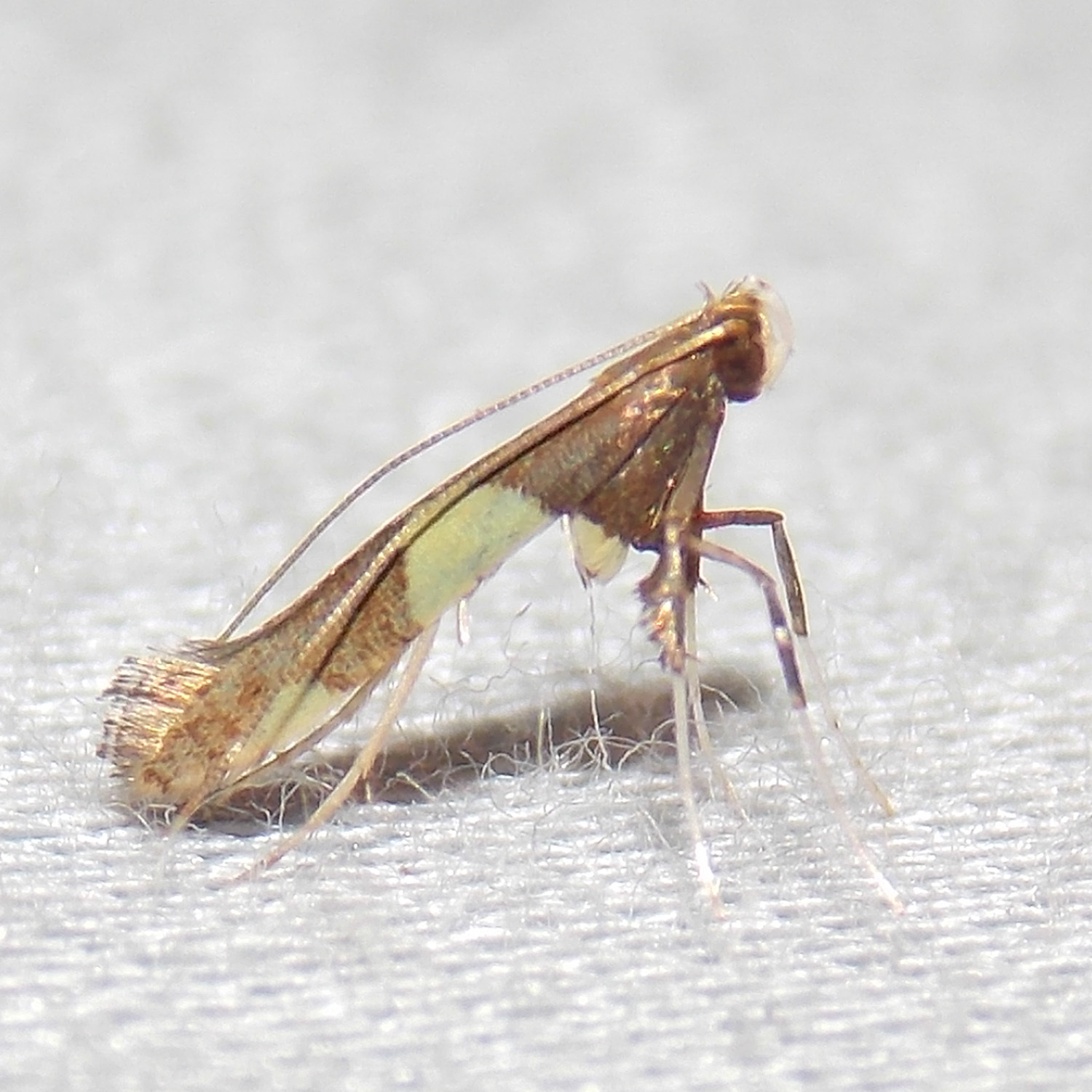

Scientific classification
- Domain: Eukaryota
- Kingdom: Animalia
- Phylum: Arthropoda
- Class: Insecta
- Order: Lepidoptera
- Family: Gracillariidae
- Genus: Caloptilia
- Species: C. bimaculatella

Binomial name
- Caloptilia bimaculatella (Ely, 1915)

= Caloptilia bimaculatella =

Species of moth

Caloptilia bimaculatella is a moth of the family Gracillariidae. It is known from Canada (Ontario and Québec) and the United States (Florida, Kentucky, Maine, Michigan, Missouri, New York, Vermont, Connecticut and West Virginia).

The wingspan is 9–10 mm.

The larvae feed on Acer rubrum. They mine the leaves of their host plant.
