= Caloptilia porphyracma =

Scientific classification
- Kingdom: Animalia
- Phylum: Arthropoda
- Class: Insecta
- Order: Lepidoptera
- Family: Gracillariidae
- Genus: Caloptilia
- Species: C. porphyracma

Binomial name
- Caloptilia porphyracma (Meyrick, 1922)

Species of moth

Caloptilia porphyracma is a moth of the family Gracillariidae. It is known from Punjab, India.
