= Caloptilia eurycryptis =

Scientific classification
- Kingdom: Animalia
- Phylum: Arthropoda
- Class: Insecta
- Order: Lepidoptera
- Family: Gracillariidae
- Genus: Caloptilia
- Species: C. eurycryptis

Binomial name
- Caloptilia eurycryptis (Meyrick, 1928)

Species of moth

Caloptilia eurycryptis is a moth of the family Gracillariidae. It is known from the Andaman Islands.
