= Caloptilia striata =

Scientific classification
- Domain: Eukaryota
- Kingdom: Animalia
- Phylum: Arthropoda
- Class: Insecta
- Order: Lepidoptera
- Family: Gracillariidae
- Genus: Caloptilia
- Species: C. striata

Binomial name
- Caloptilia striata Liu & Yuan, 1990

Species of moth

Caloptilia striata is a moth of the family Gracillariidae. It is known from Jiangxi, China.
