= Caloptilia maynei =

Scientific classification
- Kingdom: Animalia
- Phylum: Arthropoda
- Clade: Pancrustacea
- Class: Insecta
- Order: Lepidoptera
- Family: Gracillariidae
- Genus: Caloptilia
- Species: C. maynei

Binomial name
- Caloptilia maynei Ghesquière, 1940

Species of moth

Caloptilia maynei is a moth of the family Gracillariidae. It is known from the Democratic Republic of Congo and Nigeria.

The larvae feed on Pseudospondias microcarpa. They probably mine the leaves of their host plant.
