= Caloptilia callichora =

Scientific classification
- Kingdom: Animalia
- Phylum: Arthropoda
- Class: Insecta
- Order: Lepidoptera
- Family: Gracillariidae
- Genus: Caloptilia
- Species: C. callichora

Binomial name
- Caloptilia callichora (Meyrick, 1915)

Species of moth

Caloptilia callichora is a moth of the family Gracillariidae. It is found in Guyana.
