= Caloptilia euryptera =

Scientific classification
- Kingdom: Animalia
- Phylum: Arthropoda
- Class: Insecta
- Order: Lepidoptera
- Family: Gracillariidae
- Genus: Caloptilia
- Species: C. euryptera

Binomial name
- Caloptilia euryptera (Meyrick, 1908)

Species of moth

Caloptilia euryptera is a moth of the family Gracillariidae. It is known from Sri Lanka.
