= Caloptilia perixesta =

Scientific classification
- Kingdom: Animalia
- Phylum: Arthropoda
- Clade: Pancrustacea
- Class: Insecta
- Order: Lepidoptera
- Family: Gracillariidae
- Genus: Caloptilia
- Species: C. perixesta

Binomial name
- Caloptilia perixesta (Turner, 1913)

Synonyms
- Gracilaria perixesta Turner, 1913

Species of moth

Caloptilia perixesta is a moth of the family Gracillariidae. It is known from Queensland, Australia.
