= Caloptilia strictella =

Scientific classification
- Kingdom: Animalia
- Phylum: Arthropoda
- Class: Insecta
- Order: Lepidoptera
- Family: Gracillariidae
- Genus: Caloptilia
- Species: C. strictella

Binomial name
- Caloptilia strictella (Walker, 1864)

Synonyms
- Gelechia strictella Walker, 1864; Gelechia adaptella Walker, 1864; Caloptilia adaptella; Gelechia adapterella

Species of moth

Caloptilia strictella is a moth of the family Gracillariidae. It is known from Manitoba and Québec in Canada and Maine in the United States.
