= Caloptilia poecilostola =

Scientific classification
- Kingdom: Animalia
- Phylum: Arthropoda
- Class: Insecta
- Order: Lepidoptera
- Family: Gracillariidae
- Genus: Caloptilia
- Species: C. poecilostola

Binomial name
- Caloptilia poecilostola Vári, 1961

Species of moth

Caloptilia poecilostola is a moth of the family Gracillariidae. It is known from South Africa.
