= Caloptilia chrysochoa =

Scientific classification
- Kingdom: Animalia
- Phylum: Arthropoda
- Class: Insecta
- Order: Lepidoptera
- Family: Gracillariidae
- Genus: Caloptilia
- Species: C. chrysochoa

Binomial name
- Caloptilia chrysochoa (Meyrick, 1886)

Synonyms
- Caloptilia chrysochroa T. B. Fletcher, 1929

Species of moth

Caloptilia chrysochoa is a moth of the family Gracillariidae. It is known from Samoa and Tonga.
