= Caloptilia teucra =

Scientific classification
- Kingdom: Animalia
- Phylum: Arthropoda
- Class: Insecta
- Order: Lepidoptera
- Family: Gracillariidae
- Genus: Caloptilia
- Species: C. teucra

Binomial name
- Caloptilia teucra (Meyrick, 1933)

Species of moth

Caloptilia teucra is a moth of the family Gracillariidae. It is known from Hong Kong and Java, Indonesia.

The larvae feed on Bridelia species. They mine the leaves of their host plant.
