= Caloptilia pedina =

Scientific classification
- Domain: Eukaryota
- Kingdom: Animalia
- Phylum: Arthropoda
- Class: Insecta
- Order: Lepidoptera
- Family: Gracillariidae
- Genus: Caloptilia
- Species: C. pedina

Binomial name
- Caloptilia pedina (Turner, 1923)

Synonyms
- Gracilaria pedina Turner, 1923

Species of moth

Caloptilia pedina is a moth of the family Gracillariidae and is found in Queensland, Australia.
