= Caloptilia yasudai =

Scientific classification
- Kingdom: Animalia
- Phylum: Arthropoda
- Clade: Pancrustacea
- Class: Insecta
- Order: Lepidoptera
- Family: Gracillariidae
- Genus: Caloptilia
- Species: C. yasudai

Binomial name
- Caloptilia yasudai Kumata, 1982

Species of moth

Caloptilia yasudai is a moth of the family Gracillariidae. It is known from Japan (the islands of Hokkaidō and Honshū) and Korea.

The wingspan is 12-14.5 mm.
