= Caloptilia macropleura =

Scientific classification
- Kingdom: Animalia
- Phylum: Arthropoda
- Class: Insecta
- Order: Lepidoptera
- Family: Gracillariidae
- Genus: Caloptilia
- Species: C. macropleura

Binomial name
- Caloptilia macropleura (Meyrick, 1932)

Synonyms
- Gracilaria macropleura Meyrick, 1932

Species of moth

Caloptilia macropleura is a moth of the family Gracillariidae. It is known from Ethiopia and South Africa.
