= Caloptilia argalea =

Scientific classification
- Kingdom: Animalia
- Phylum: Arthropoda
- Class: Insecta
- Order: Lepidoptera
- Family: Gracillariidae
- Genus: Caloptilia
- Species: C. argalea

Binomial name
- Caloptilia argalea (Meyrick, 1908)

Species of moth

Caloptilia argalea is a moth of the family Gracillariidae. It is known from India (Meghalaya) and Sri Lanka.
