= Caloptilia euglypta =

Scientific classification
- Domain: Eukaryota
- Kingdom: Animalia
- Phylum: Arthropoda
- Class: Insecta
- Order: Lepidoptera
- Family: Gracillariidae
- Genus: Caloptilia
- Species: C. euglypta

Binomial name
- Caloptilia euglypta (Turner, 1894)

Synonyms
- Gracilaria euglypta Turner, 1894

Species of moth

Caloptilia euglypta is a moth of the family Gracillariidae. It is known from Queensland, Australia.
