= Caloptilia aeolocentra =

Scientific classification
- Kingdom: Animalia
- Phylum: Arthropoda
- Class: Insecta
- Order: Lepidoptera
- Family: Gracillariidae
- Genus: Caloptilia
- Species: C. aeolocentra

Binomial name
- Caloptilia aeolocentra (Meyrick, 1922)

Species of moth

Caloptilia aeolocentra is a moth of the family Gracillariidae. It is known from India (Assam, Meghalaya).
