= Caloptilia loxocentra =

Scientific classification
- Kingdom: Animalia
- Phylum: Arthropoda
- Clade: Pancrustacea
- Class: Insecta
- Order: Lepidoptera
- Family: Gracillariidae
- Genus: Caloptilia
- Species: C. loxocentra

Binomial name
- Caloptilia loxocentra (Turner, 1915)

Synonyms
- Gracilaria loxocentra Turner, 1915

Species of moth

Caloptilia loxocentra is a moth of the family Gracillariidae. It is known from New South Wales, Australia.
