= Caloptilia heterocosma =

Scientific classification
- Kingdom: Animalia
- Phylum: Arthropoda
- Class: Insecta
- Order: Lepidoptera
- Family: Gracillariidae
- Genus: Caloptilia
- Species: C. heterocosma

Binomial name
- Caloptilia heterocosma (Meyrick, 1931)

Species of moth

Caloptilia heterocosma is a moth of the family Gracillariidae. It is known from India (Assam).
