= Caloptilia euhelia =

Scientific classification
- Domain: Eukaryota
- Kingdom: Animalia
- Phylum: Arthropoda
- Class: Insecta
- Order: Lepidoptera
- Family: Gracillariidae
- Genus: Caloptilia
- Species: C. euhelia

Binomial name
- Caloptilia euhelia Diakonoff, 1955

Species of moth

Caloptilia euhelia is a moth of the family Gracillariidae. It is known from Papua New Guinea.
