= Caloptilia striolata =

Scientific classification
- Kingdom: Animalia
- Phylum: Arthropoda
- Class: Insecta
- Order: Lepidoptera
- Family: Gracillariidae
- Genus: Caloptilia
- Species: C. striolata

Binomial name
- Caloptilia striolata Liu & Yuan, 1990

Synonyms
- Caloptilia (Povolnya) striolata Liu & Yuan, 1990; Povolnya striolata (Liu & Yuan, 1990)

Species of moth

Caloptilia striolata or Povolnya striolata is a moth of the family Gracillariidae. It is known from Fujian, China.
