= Caloptilia aeolastis =

Scientific classification
- Kingdom: Animalia
- Phylum: Arthropoda
- Class: Insecta
- Order: Lepidoptera
- Family: Gracillariidae
- Genus: Caloptilia
- Species: C. aeolastis

Binomial name
- Caloptilia aeolastis (Meyrick, 1920)

Species of moth

Caloptilia aeolastis is a moth of the family Gracillariidae. It is known from Brazil.
