= Caloptilia similatella =

Scientific classification
- Kingdom: Animalia
- Phylum: Arthropoda
- Clade: Pancrustacea
- Class: Insecta
- Order: Lepidoptera
- Family: Gracillariidae
- Genus: Caloptilia
- Species: C. similatella

Binomial name
- Caloptilia similatella (Zeller, 1877)

Species of moth

Caloptilia similatella is a moth of the family Gracillariidae. It is known from Colombia and the United States Virgin Islands (Saint Croix and Saint Thomas).
