= Caloptilia matsumurai =

Scientific classification
- Kingdom: Animalia
- Phylum: Arthropoda
- Class: Insecta
- Order: Lepidoptera
- Family: Gracillariidae
- Genus: Caloptilia
- Species: C. matsumurai

Binomial name
- Caloptilia matsumurai Kumata, 1982

Species of moth

Caloptilia matsumurai is a moth of the family Gracillariidae. It is known from Honshū, Japan.

The wingspan is 11.7–13.2 mm.

The larvae feed on Toxicodendron sylvestre and Toxicodendron trichocarpum. They mine the leaves of their host plant.
