= Caloptilia teleodelta =

Scientific classification
- Kingdom: Animalia
- Phylum: Arthropoda
- Class: Insecta
- Order: Lepidoptera
- Family: Gracillariidae
- Genus: Caloptilia
- Species: C. teleodelta

Binomial name
- Caloptilia teleodelta (Meyrick, 1926)

Species of moth

Caloptilia teleodelta is a moth of the family Gracillariidae. It is known from Maharashtra and Uttaranchal, India.

The larvae feed on Flueggia microcarpa and Flueggia virosa. They mine the leaves of their host plant.
