= Caloptilia rjabovi =

Scientific classification
- Domain: Eukaryota
- Kingdom: Animalia
- Phylum: Arthropoda
- Class: Insecta
- Order: Lepidoptera
- Family: Gracillariidae
- Genus: Caloptilia
- Species: C. rjabovi

Binomial name
- Caloptilia rjabovi Kuznetzov & Baryshnikova, 2001

Species of moth

Caloptilia rjabovi is a moth of the family Gracillariidae. It is known from Azerbaijan.
