= Caloptilia megalaurata =

Scientific classification
- Domain: Eukaryota
- Kingdom: Animalia
- Phylum: Arthropoda
- Class: Insecta
- Order: Lepidoptera
- Family: Gracillariidae
- Genus: Caloptilia
- Species: C. megalaurata

Binomial name
- Caloptilia megalaurata Legrand, 1965

Species of moth

Caloptilia megalaurata is a moth of the family Gracillariidae. It is known from the Seychelles.
