= Caloptilia bipunctata =

Scientific classification
- Kingdom: Animalia
- Phylum: Arthropoda
- Class: Insecta
- Order: Lepidoptera
- Family: Gracillariidae
- Genus: Caloptilia
- Species: C. bipunctata

Binomial name
- Caloptilia bipunctata Kumata, 1982

Species of moth

Caloptilia bipunctata is a moth of the family Gracillariidae. It is known from Japan (Honshū).

The wingspan is 10.2-11.5 mm.

The larvae feed on Neolitsea sericea. They mine the leaves of their host plant.
