= Caloptilia crocostola =

Scientific classification
- Domain: Eukaryota
- Kingdom: Animalia
- Phylum: Arthropoda
- Class: Insecta
- Order: Lepidoptera
- Family: Gracillariidae
- Genus: Caloptilia
- Species: C. crocostola

Binomial name
- Caloptilia crocostola (Turner, 1917)

Synonyms
- Gracilaria crocostola Turner, 1917

Species of moth

Caloptilia crocostola is a moth of the family Gracillariidae. It is known from Queensland, Australia.
