= Caloptilia hamulifera =

Scientific classification
- Domain: Eukaryota
- Kingdom: Animalia
- Phylum: Arthropoda
- Class: Insecta
- Order: Lepidoptera
- Family: Gracillariidae
- Genus: Caloptilia
- Species: C. hamulifera

Binomial name
- Caloptilia hamulifera Liu & Yuan, 1990

Species of moth

Caloptilia hamulifera is a moth of the family Gracillariidae. It is known from China (Sichuan).
