= Caloptilia crinotibialis =

Scientific classification
- Kingdom: Animalia
- Phylum: Arthropoda
- Class: Insecta
- Order: Lepidoptera
- Family: Gracillariidae
- Genus: Caloptilia
- Species: C. crinotibialis

Binomial name
- Caloptilia crinotibialis Kumata, 1982

Species of moth

Caloptilia crinotibialis is a moth of the family Gracillariidae. It is known to be from Japan (Honshū, Kyūshū).

The wingspan is 16.2–16.8 mm.

The larvae feed on Persea japonica. They mine the leaves of their host plant.
