= Caloptilia selimpat =

Scientific classification
- Kingdom: Animalia
- Phylum: Arthropoda
- Class: Insecta
- Order: Lepidoptera
- Family: Gracillariidae
- Genus: Caloptilia
- Species: C. selimpat

Binomial name
- Caloptilia selimpat Yuan & Robinson, 1993

Species of moth

Caloptilia selimpat is a moth belonging to the Gracillariidae family. It is known from Pahang, Malaysia.
