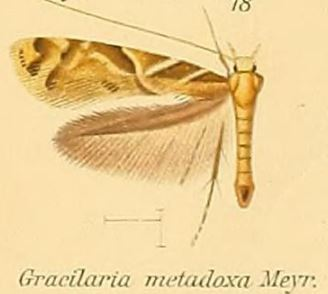

Scientific classification
- Kingdom: Animalia
- Phylum: Arthropoda
- Class: Insecta
- Order: Lepidoptera
- Family: Gracillariidae
- Genus: Caloptilia
- Species: C. metadoxa

Binomial name
- Caloptilia metadoxa (Meyrick, 1908)

Synonyms
- Gracilaria metadoxa Meyrick, 1908

= Caloptilia metadoxa =

Species of moth

Caloptilia metadoxa is a moth of the family Gracillariidae. It is known from Meghalaya, India.
