= Caloptilia alpherakiella =

Scientific classification
- Domain: Eukaryota
- Kingdom: Animalia
- Phylum: Arthropoda
- Class: Insecta
- Order: Lepidoptera
- Family: Gracillariidae
- Genus: Caloptilia
- Species: C. alpherakiella

Binomial name
- Caloptilia alpherakiella (Krulikovsky, 1909)

Species of moth

Caloptilia alpherakiella is a moth of the family Gracillariidae. It is known from the European part of Russia.
