= Caloptilia jasminicola =

Scientific classification
- Domain: Eukaryota
- Kingdom: Animalia
- Phylum: Arthropoda
- Class: Insecta
- Order: Lepidoptera
- Family: Gracillariidae
- Genus: Caloptilia
- Species: C. jasminicola

Binomial name
- Caloptilia jasminicola Liu & Yuan, 1990

Species of moth

Caloptilia jasminicola is a moth of the family Gracillariidae. It is known from Fujian and Guangdong, China.

The larvae feed on Jasminum sambac. They mine the leaves of their host plant.
