= Caloptilia pentaphylactis =

Scientific classification
- Kingdom: Animalia
- Phylum: Arthropoda
- Class: Insecta
- Order: Lepidoptera
- Family: Gracillariidae
- Genus: Caloptilia
- Species: C. pentaphylactis

Binomial name
- Caloptilia pentaphylactis (Meyrick, 1938)

Species of moth

Caloptilia pentaphylactis is a moth of the family Gracillariidae. It is known from Papua New Guinea.
