= Caloptilia zonotarsa =

Scientific classification
- Kingdom: Animalia
- Phylum: Arthropoda
- Class: Insecta
- Order: Lepidoptera
- Family: Gracillariidae
- Genus: Caloptilia
- Species: C. zonotarsa

Binomial name
- Caloptilia zonotarsa (Meyrick, 1936)

Species of moth

Caloptilia zonotarsa is a moth of the family Gracillariidae. It is known from Uttaranchal, India.

The larvae feed on Phoebe lanceolata. They probably mine the leaves of their host plant.
