= Caloptilia tmetica =

Scientific classification
- Domain: Eukaryota
- Kingdom: Animalia
- Phylum: Arthropoda
- Class: Insecta
- Order: Lepidoptera
- Family: Gracillariidae
- Genus: Caloptilia
- Species: C. tmetica

Binomial name
- Caloptilia tmetica Diakonoff, 1955

Species of moth

Caloptilia tmetica is a moth of the family Gracillariidae. It is known from Papua New Guinea.
