= Povolnya platycosma =

Scientific classification
- Kingdom: Animalia
- Phylum: Arthropoda
- Class: Insecta
- Order: Lepidoptera
- Family: Gracillariidae
- Genus: Caloptilia
- Species: C. platycosma

Binomial name
- Caloptilia platycosma (Meyrick, 1912)

Synonyms
- Caloptilia platycosma (Meyrick, 1912); Gracilaria platycosma Meyrick, 1912

Species of moth

Povolnya platycosma is a moth of the family Gracillariidae. It is known from Sri Lanka.

The larvae feed on Litsea glutinosa. They mine the leaves of their host plant.
