= Caloptilia ecphanes =

Scientific classification
- Kingdom: Animalia
- Phylum: Arthropoda
- Clade: Pancrustacea
- Class: Insecta
- Order: Lepidoptera
- Family: Gracillariidae
- Genus: Caloptilia
- Species: C. ecphanes

Binomial name
- Caloptilia ecphanes (Turner, 1940)

Synonyms
- Gracilaria ecphanes Turner, 1940

Species of moth

Caloptilia ecphanes is a moth of the family Gracillariidae. It is known from New South Wales, Australia.
