= Caloptilia titanitis =

Scientific classification
- Kingdom: Animalia
- Phylum: Arthropoda
- Class: Insecta
- Order: Lepidoptera
- Family: Gracillariidae
- Genus: Caloptilia
- Species: C. titanitis

Binomial name
- Caloptilia titanitis (Meyrick, 1921)

Synonyms
- Gracilaria titanitis Meyrick, 1921

Species of moth

Caloptilia titanitis is a moth in the family Gracillariidae. The species originates from South Africa.
