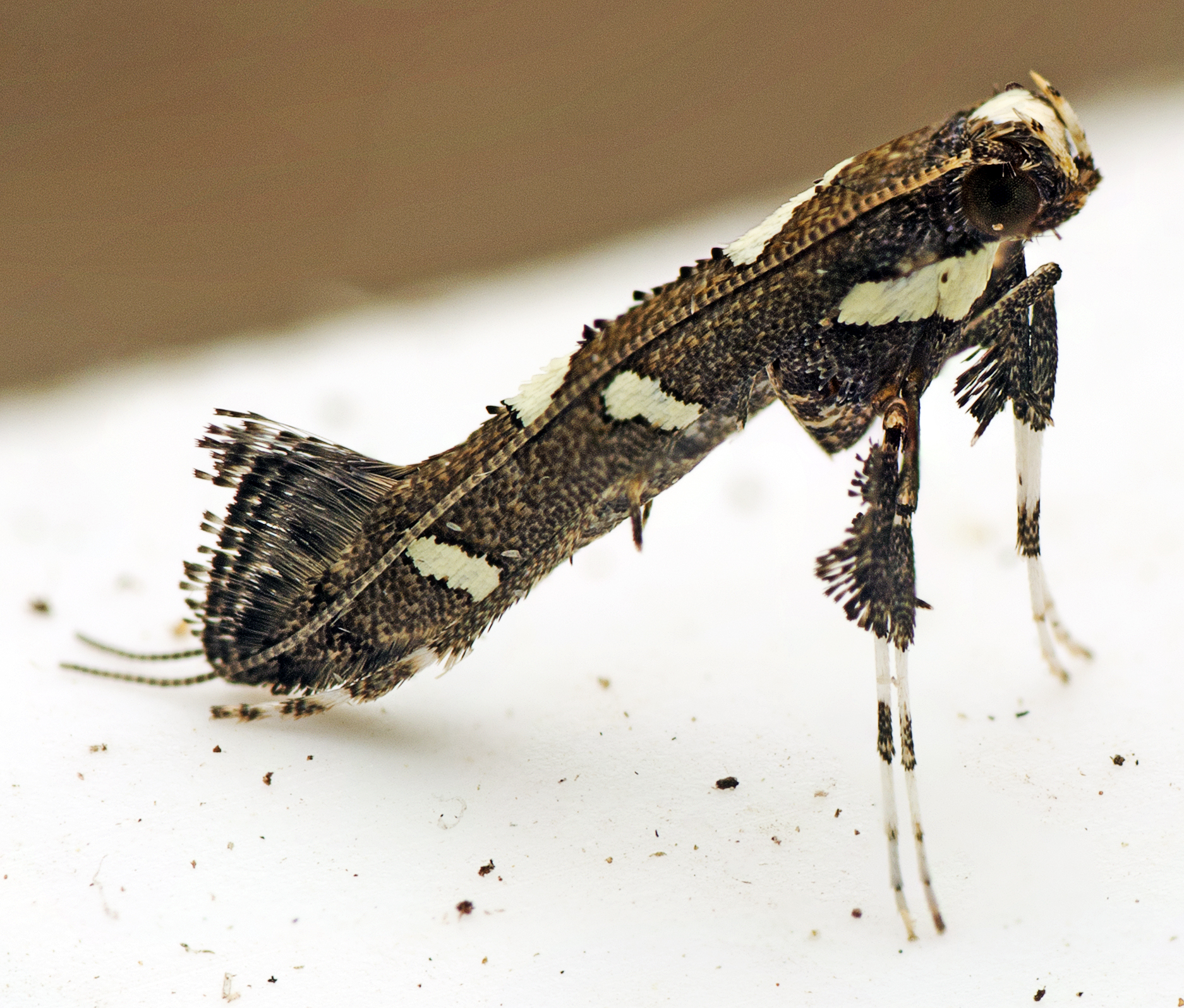

Scientific classification
- Domain: Eukaryota
- Kingdom: Animalia
- Phylum: Arthropoda
- Class: Insecta
- Order: Lepidoptera
- Family: Gracillariidae
- Genus: Caloptilia
- Species: C. adelosema

Binomial name
- Caloptilia adelosema (Turner, 1940)

Synonyms
- Gracilaria adelosema Turner, 1940

= Caloptilia adelosema =

Species of moth

Caloptilia adelosema is a moth of the family Gracillariidae. It is known from Queensland, Australia.
