= Caloptilia columbaepennella =

Scientific classification
- Domain: Eukaryota
- Kingdom: Animalia
- Phylum: Arthropoda
- Class: Insecta
- Order: Lepidoptera
- Family: Gracillariidae
- Genus: Caloptilia
- Species: C. columbaepennella

Binomial name
- Caloptilia columbaepennella (A. Costa, 1839)

Species of moth

Caloptilia columbaepennella is a moth of the family Gracillariidae. It is known from Italy.
