= Caloptilia dactylifera =

Scientific classification
- Kingdom: Animalia
- Phylum: Arthropoda
- Clade: Pancrustacea
- Class: Insecta
- Order: Lepidoptera
- Family: Gracillariidae
- Genus: Caloptilia
- Species: C. dactylifera

Binomial name
- Caloptilia dactylifera Liu & Yuan, 1990

Species of moth

Caloptilia dactylifera is a moth of the family Gracillariidae. It is known from China (Jiangxi).
