= Caloptilia cyanoxantha =

Scientific classification
- Kingdom: Animalia
- Phylum: Arthropoda
- Class: Insecta
- Order: Lepidoptera
- Family: Gracillariidae
- Genus: Caloptilia
- Species: C. cyanoxantha

Binomial name
- Caloptilia cyanoxantha (Meyrick, 1920)

Synonyms
- Timodora cyanoxantha Meyrick, 1920

Species of moth

Caloptilia cyanoxantha is a moth of the family Gracillariidae. It is known from Queensland.
