= Caloptilia parasticta =

Scientific classification
- Kingdom: Animalia
- Phylum: Arthropoda
- Class: Insecta
- Order: Lepidoptera
- Family: Gracillariidae
- Genus: Caloptilia
- Species: C. parasticta

Binomial name
- Caloptilia parasticta (Meyrick, 1908)

Species of moth

Caloptilia parasticta is a moth of the family Gracillariidae. It is known from Meghalaya, India.
