= Caloptilia garcinicola =

Scientific classification
- Kingdom: Animalia
- Phylum: Arthropoda
- Clade: Pancrustacea
- Class: Insecta
- Order: Lepidoptera
- Family: Gracillariidae
- Genus: Caloptilia
- Species: C. garcinicola

Binomial name
- Caloptilia garcinicola Liu & Yuan, 1990

Species of moth

Caloptilia garcinicola is a moth of the family Gracillariidae. It is known from China (Guangxi).

The larvae feed on Garcinia tinctoria. They mine the leaves of their host plant.
