= Caloptilia wakayamensis =

Scientific classification
- Kingdom: Animalia
- Phylum: Arthropoda
- Class: Insecta
- Order: Lepidoptera
- Family: Gracillariidae
- Genus: Caloptilia
- Species: C. wakayamensis

Binomial name
- Caloptilia wakayamensis Kumata, 1966

Species of moth

Caloptilia wakayamensis is a moth of the family Gracillariidae. It is known from Honshū island, Japan.

The wingspan is 10–11 mm.

The larvae feed on Acer palmatum. They probably mine the leaves of their host plant.
