= Caloptilia vicinola =

Scientific classification
- Kingdom: Animalia
- Phylum: Arthropoda
- Class: Insecta
- Order: Lepidoptera
- Family: Gracillariidae
- Genus: Caloptilia
- Species: C. vicinola

Binomial name
- Caloptilia vicinola Vári, 1961

Synonyms
- Caloptilia vicinicola

Species of moth

Caloptilia vicinola is a moth of the family Gracillariidae. It is known from South Africa and Zimbabwe.
