= Caloptilia aeneocapitella =

Scientific classification
- Domain: Eukaryota
- Kingdom: Animalia
- Phylum: Arthropoda
- Class: Insecta
- Order: Lepidoptera
- Family: Gracillariidae
- Genus: Caloptilia
- Species: C. aeneocapitella

Binomial name
- Caloptilia aeneocapitella (Walsingham, 1891)

Species of insect

Caloptilia aeneocapitella is a moth of the family Gracillariidae. It is known from Puerto Rico and Saint Vincent and the Grenadines.
