= Caloptilia palaearcha =

Scientific classification
- Kingdom: Animalia
- Phylum: Arthropoda
- Class: Insecta
- Order: Lepidoptera
- Family: Gracillariidae
- Genus: Caloptilia
- Species: C. palaearcha

Binomial name
- Caloptilia palaearcha (Meyrick, 1930)

Species of moth

Caloptilia palaearcha is a moth of the family Gracillariidae. It is known from Fiji.

The larvae feed on Euphorbiaceae species. They probably mine the leaves of their host plant.
