= Caloptilia citrochrysa =

Scientific classification
- Kingdom: Animalia
- Phylum: Arthropoda
- Class: Insecta
- Order: Lepidoptera
- Family: Gracillariidae
- Genus: Caloptilia
- Species: C. citrochrysa

Binomial name
- Caloptilia citrochrysa (Meyrick, 1930)

Species of moth

Caloptilia citrochrysa is a moth of the family Gracillariidae. It is known from India (Bihar).

The larvae feed on Drypetes roxburghii. They mine the leaves of their host plant.
