= Caloptilia scansoria =

Scientific classification
- Kingdom: Animalia
- Phylum: Arthropoda
- Class: Insecta
- Order: Lepidoptera
- Family: Gracillariidae
- Genus: Caloptilia
- Species: C. scansoria

Binomial name
- Caloptilia scansoria (Meyrick, 1910)

Species of moth

Caloptilia scansoria is a moth of the family Gracillariidae. It is known from Himachal Pradesh, India.
