= Caloptilia hemiconis =

Scientific classification
- Kingdom: Animalia
- Phylum: Arthropoda
- Class: Insecta
- Order: Lepidoptera
- Family: Gracillariidae
- Genus: Caloptilia
- Species: C. hemiconis

Binomial name
- Caloptilia hemiconis (Meyrick, 1894)

Synonyms
- Caloptilia rhaptocrossa (Meyrick, 1932)

Species of moth

Caloptilia hemiconis is a moth of the family Gracillariidae. It is known from India, Indonesia (Bali and Java), Myanmar and Thailand.
