= Caloptilia stictocrossa =

Scientific classification
- Domain: Eukaryota
- Kingdom: Animalia
- Phylum: Arthropoda
- Class: Insecta
- Order: Lepidoptera
- Family: Gracillariidae
- Genus: Caloptilia
- Species: C. stictocrossa

Binomial name
- Caloptilia stictocrossa (Turner, 1947)

Synonyms
- Parectopa stictocrossa Turner, 1947

Species of moth

Caloptilia stictocrossa is a moth of the family Gracillariidae. It is known from Queensland, Australia.
