= Caloptilia porphyranthes =

Scientific classification
- Kingdom: Animalia
- Phylum: Arthropoda
- Class: Insecta
- Order: Lepidoptera
- Family: Gracillariidae
- Genus: Caloptilia
- Species: C. porphyranthes

Binomial name
- Caloptilia porphyranthes (Meyrick, 1921)

Synonyms
- Gracilaria porphyranthes Meyrick, 1921

Species of moth

Caloptilia porphyranthes is a moth of the family Gracillariidae. It is known from Namibia and South Africa.
