= Caloptilia scutigera =

Scientific classification
- Kingdom: Animalia
- Phylum: Arthropoda
- Clade: Pancrustacea
- Class: Insecta
- Order: Lepidoptera
- Family: Gracillariidae
- Genus: Caloptilia
- Species: C. scutigera

Binomial name
- Caloptilia scutigera (Meyrick, 1921)

Synonyms
- Gracilaria scutigera Meyrick, 1921

Species of moth

Caloptilia scutigera is a moth of the family Gracillariidae. It is known from Queensland, Australia.
