= Caloptilia populiella =

Scientific classification
- Kingdom: Animalia
- Phylum: Arthropoda
- Clade: Pancrustacea
- Class: Insecta
- Order: Lepidoptera
- Family: Gracillariidae
- Genus: Caloptilia
- Species: C. populiella

Binomial name
- Caloptilia populiella (Chambers, 1875)

Species of moth

Caloptilia populiella is a moth of the family Gracillariidae. It is known from British Columbia, Canada, and Colorado, United States.

The larvae feed on Populus species, including Populus tremuloides. They mine the leaves of their host plant.
