= Caloptilia amphidelta =

Scientific classification
- Kingdom: Animalia
- Phylum: Arthropoda
- Class: Insecta
- Order: Lepidoptera
- Family: Gracillariidae
- Genus: Caloptilia
- Species: C. amphidelta

Binomial name
- Caloptilia amphidelta (Meyrick, 1918)

Species of moth

Caloptilia amphidelta is a moth of the family Gracillariidae. It is known from Canada (Ontario and Québec).
