= Caloptilia aurora =

Scientific classification
- Kingdom: Animalia
- Phylum: Arthropoda
- Clade: Pancrustacea
- Class: Insecta
- Order: Lepidoptera
- Family: Gracillariidae
- Genus: Caloptilia
- Species: C. aurora

Binomial name
- Caloptilia aurora (Turner, 1894)

Synonyms
- Gracilaria aurora Turner, 1894

Species of moth

Caloptilia aurora is a moth of the family Gracillariidae. It is known from Queensland, Australia.
