= Caloptilia prismatica =

Scientific classification
- Kingdom: Animalia
- Phylum: Arthropoda
- Class: Insecta
- Order: Lepidoptera
- Family: Gracillariidae
- Genus: Caloptilia
- Species: C. prismatica

Binomial name
- Caloptilia prismatica (Meyrick, 1907)

Synonyms
- Gracilaria prismatica Meyrick, 1907

Species of moth

Caloptilia prismatica is a moth of the family Gracillariidae. It is known from Sri Lanka.

This species has a wingspan of 13–15 mm, head and thorax are greyish-ochreous, mixed with dark grey. Forewings are dark greyish-ochreous, with prismatic violet or blue reflections, strewn with numerous small blackish dots in longitudinal series.
