= Caloptilia infaceta =

Scientific classification
- Kingdom: Animalia
- Phylum: Arthropoda
- Clade: Pancrustacea
- Class: Insecta
- Order: Lepidoptera
- Family: Gracillariidae
- Genus: Caloptilia
- Species: C. infaceta

Binomial name
- Caloptilia infaceta Triberti, 1987

Species of moth

Caloptilia infaceta is a moth of the family Gracillariidae. It is known from Madagascar.
