= Caloptilia rhodorella =

Scientific classification
- Domain: Eukaryota
- Kingdom: Animalia
- Phylum: Arthropoda
- Class: Insecta
- Order: Lepidoptera
- Family: Gracillariidae
- Genus: Caloptilia
- Species: C. rhodorella

Binomial name
- Caloptilia rhodorella (McDunnough, 1954)

Species of moth

Caloptilia rhodorella is a moth of the family Gracillariidae. It is known from Nova Scotia, Canada.

The larvae feed on Rhododendron canadense and Rhodora species. They mine the leaves of their host plant.
