= Caloptilia iorphna =

Scientific classification
- Kingdom: Animalia
- Phylum: Arthropoda
- Class: Insecta
- Order: Lepidoptera
- Family: Gracillariidae
- Genus: Caloptilia
- Species: C. iorphna

Binomial name
- Caloptilia iorphna (Meyrick, 1939)

Species of moth

Caloptilia iorphna is a moth of the family Gracillariidae. It is known from Java, Indonesia.

The larvae feed on Mucuna species. They mine the leaves of their host plant.
