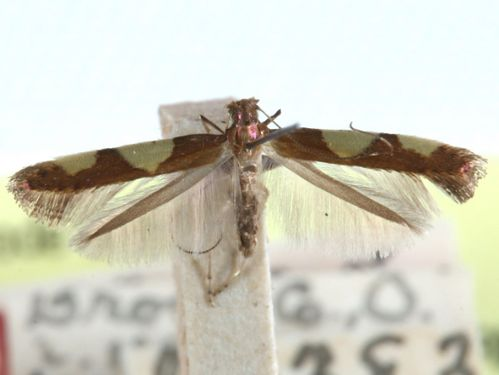

Scientific classification
- Kingdom: Animalia
- Phylum: Arthropoda
- Clade: Pancrustacea
- Class: Insecta
- Order: Lepidoptera
- Family: Gracillariidae
- Genus: Caloptilia
- Species: C. speciosella

Binomial name
- Caloptilia speciosella (Braun, 1939)

= Caloptilia speciosella =

Species of moth

Caloptilia speciosella is a moth of the family Gracillariidae. It is known from Ohio and Kentucky in the United States.

The larvae feed on Acer rubrum. They mine the leaves of their host plant.
