= Caloptilia sachalinella =

Scientific classification
- Domain: Eukaryota
- Kingdom: Animalia
- Phylum: Arthropoda
- Class: Insecta
- Order: Lepidoptera
- Family: Gracillariidae
- Genus: Caloptilia
- Species: C. sachalinella

Binomial name
- Caloptilia sachalinella Ermolaev, 1984

Species of moth

Caloptilia sachalinella is a moth of the family Gracillariidae. It is known from the Russian Far East.

The larvae feed on Alnus hirsuta. They mine the leaves of their host plant.
