= Caloptilia fera =

Scientific classification
- Kingdom: Animalia
- Phylum: Arthropoda
- Clade: Pancrustacea
- Class: Insecta
- Order: Lepidoptera
- Family: Gracillariidae
- Genus: Caloptilia
- Species: C. fera

Binomial name
- Caloptilia fera Triberti, 1989

Species of moth

Caloptilia fera is a moth of the family Gracillariidae. It is known from Kenya and Nigeria.

The larvae feed on Vigna unguiculata. They probably mine the leaves of their host plant.
