= Caloptilia viridula =

Scientific classification
- Kingdom: Animalia
- Phylum: Arthropoda
- Clade: Pancrustacea
- Class: Insecta
- Order: Lepidoptera
- Family: Gracillariidae
- Genus: Caloptilia
- Species: C. viridula

Binomial name
- Caloptilia viridula (Zeller, 1877)

Species of moth

Caloptilia viridula is a moth of the family Gracillariidae. It is known from Colombia.
