= Caloptilia chalcoptera =

Scientific classification
- Kingdom: Animalia
- Phylum: Arthropoda
- Clade: Pancrustacea
- Class: Insecta
- Order: Lepidoptera
- Family: Gracillariidae
- Genus: Caloptilia
- Species: C. chalcoptera

Binomial name
- Caloptilia chalcoptera (Meyrick, 1880)

Synonyms
- Gracilaria chalcoptera Meyrick, 1880

Species of moth

Caloptilia chalcoptera is a moth of the family Gracillariidae. It is known from New South Wales and Queensland, Australia.
