= Caloptilia gloriosa =

Scientific classification
- Kingdom: Animalia
- Phylum: Arthropoda
- Class: Insecta
- Order: Lepidoptera
- Family: Gracillariidae
- Genus: Caloptilia
- Species: C. gloriosa

Binomial name
- Caloptilia gloriosa Kumata, 1966

Species of moth

Caloptilia gloriosa is a moth belonging to the Gracillariidae family. It is known from Japan (Hokkaidō, Honshū) and the Russian Far East.

The wingspan is 8.5–10 mm.

The larvae feed on Acer japonicum, Acer mono, Acer palmatum and Acer sieboldianum. They probably mine the leaves of their host plant.
