= Fullmoon maple =

Fullmoon maple is a name that has been used for two different but closely related maples from Japan:

- Acer japonicum (also called downy Japanese maple)
- Acer shirasawanum (also called Shirasawa's maple)
