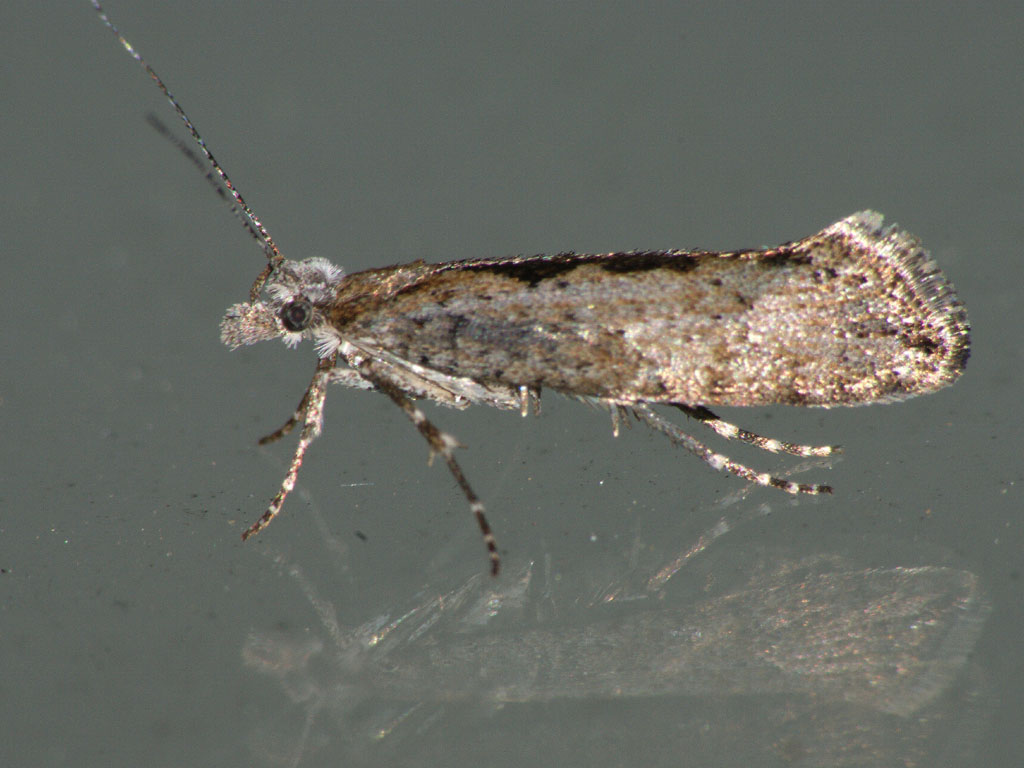
- Ypsolopha vittella Russia, Moscow, Mozhaysky District,

Scientific classification
- Kingdom: Animalia
- Phylum: Arthropoda
- Class: Insecta
- Order: Lepidoptera
- Family: Ypsolophidae
- Genus: Ypsolopha
- Species: Y. vittella

Binomial name
- Ypsolopha vittella (Linnaeus, 1758)

Synonyms
- Phalaena vittella Linnaeus, 1758

= Ypsolopha vittella =

Elm autumn moth

Species of moth

Ypsolopha vittella, the elm autumn moth, is a moth of the family Ypsolophidae. It is found from Europe through Siberia to Japan, including China, Asia Minor and mideast Asia. The habitat consists of woodlands and copses.

The wingspan is 16–20 mm. The head is light grey. Forewings pale grey or whitish-grey, sometimes brownish-mixed, sprinkled or strigulated with dark grey, sometimes more or less wholly suffused with blackish; a blackish or dark fuscous streak along dorsum, forming triangular projections upwards before and beyond middle. Hindwings are grey. The larva is brown- blackish; dorsal stripe broadly whitish.

Adults are on wing from July to August. There is one generation per year.

The larvae feed on the leaves and flowers of Ulmus and Fagus species. Other recorded food plants include Quercus, Lonicera and Acer pseudosieboldianum.
