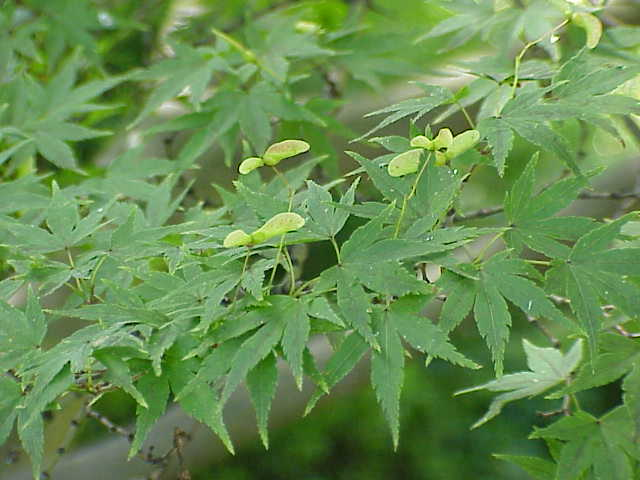

Conservation status
- Least Concern (IUCN 3.1)

Scientific classification
- Kingdom: Plantae
- Clade: Tracheophytes
- Clade: Angiosperms
- Clade: Eudicots
- Clade: Rosids
- Order: Sapindales
- Family: Sapindaceae
- Genus: Acer
- Section: Acer sect. Palmata
- Series: Acer ser. Palmata
- Species: A. palmatum

Binomial name
- Acer palmatum Thunb. 1784 not Raf. 1836

Synonyms
- List: Acer amoenum Carrière; Acer decompositum Dippel; Acer dissectum Thunb.; Acer formosum Carrière; Acer friederici-guillelmii Carr; Acer incisum Dippel; Acer jucundum Carrière; Acer ornatum Carrière; Acer pinnatifidum Dippel; Acer polymorphum Siebold & Zucc. 1845 not Spach 1834; Acer pulverulentum Dippel; Acer ribesifolium Dippel; Acer roseomarginatum (Van Houtte) Koidz.; Acer sanguineum Carrière 1867 not Spach 1834; Acer septemlobum Thunb.; Acer sessilifolium Siebold & Zucc.; Negundo sessilifolium Miq.; Acer matsumurae (Koidz.) Koidz.

= Acer palmatum =

Species of maple

Acer palmatum, commonly known as Japanese maple, palmate maple, or smooth Japanese maple (Korean: danpungnamu [단풍나무]; Japanese: irohamomiji [イロハモミジ] or momiji [紅葉]), is a species of woody plant native to Korea, Japan, China, eastern Mongolia, and far eastern Russia. Many different cultivars of this maple have been selected and they are grown worldwide for their large variety of attractive forms, leaf shapes, and spectacular colors.

== Description ==
Acer palmatum is deciduous, with the growth habit of a shrub or small tree reaching heights of 6 to 10 m (20 to 33 ft), rarely 16 m (52 ft), reaching a mature width of 4.5 to 10 m (15 to 33 ft), often growing as an understory plant in shady woodlands in its native habitat. It may have multiple trunks joining close to the ground. In habit, its canopy often takes on a dome-like form, especially when mature. The leaves are 4–12 cm (1 1/2–4 3/4 in) long and wide, palmately lobed with five, seven, or nine acutely pointed lobes. The flowers are produced in small cymes, the individual flowers with five red or purple sepals and five whitish petals. The fruit is a pair of winged samaras, each samara 2–3 cm (3/4–1 1/4 in) long with a 6–8 mm (1/4–5/16 in) seed. The seeds of Acer palmatum and similar species require stratification in order to germinate.

Even in nature, Acer palmatum displays considerable genetic variation, with seedlings from the same parent tree typically showing differences in such traits as leaf size, shape, and color. The overall form of the tree can vary from upright to weeping.

Three subspecies are recognised:

- Acer palmatum subsp. palmatum. Leaves small, 4–7 cm (1 1/2–2 3/4 in) wide, with five or seven lobes and double-serrate margins; seed wings 10–15 mm (3/8–5/8 in). Lower altitudes throughout central and southern Japan (not Hokkaido).
- Acer palmatum subsp. amoenum (Carrière) H.Hara. Leaves larger, 6–12 cm (2 1/4–4 3/4 in) wide, with seven or nine lobes and single-serrate margins; seed wings 20–25 mm (3/4–1 in). Higher altitudes throughout Japan and South Korea.
- Acer palmatum subsp. matsumurae Koidz. Leaves larger, 6–12 cm (2 1/4–4 3/4 in) wide, with seven (rarely five or nine) lobes and double-serrate margins; seed wings 15–25 mm (5/8–1 in). Higher altitudes throughout Japan.

== Cultivation and uses ==
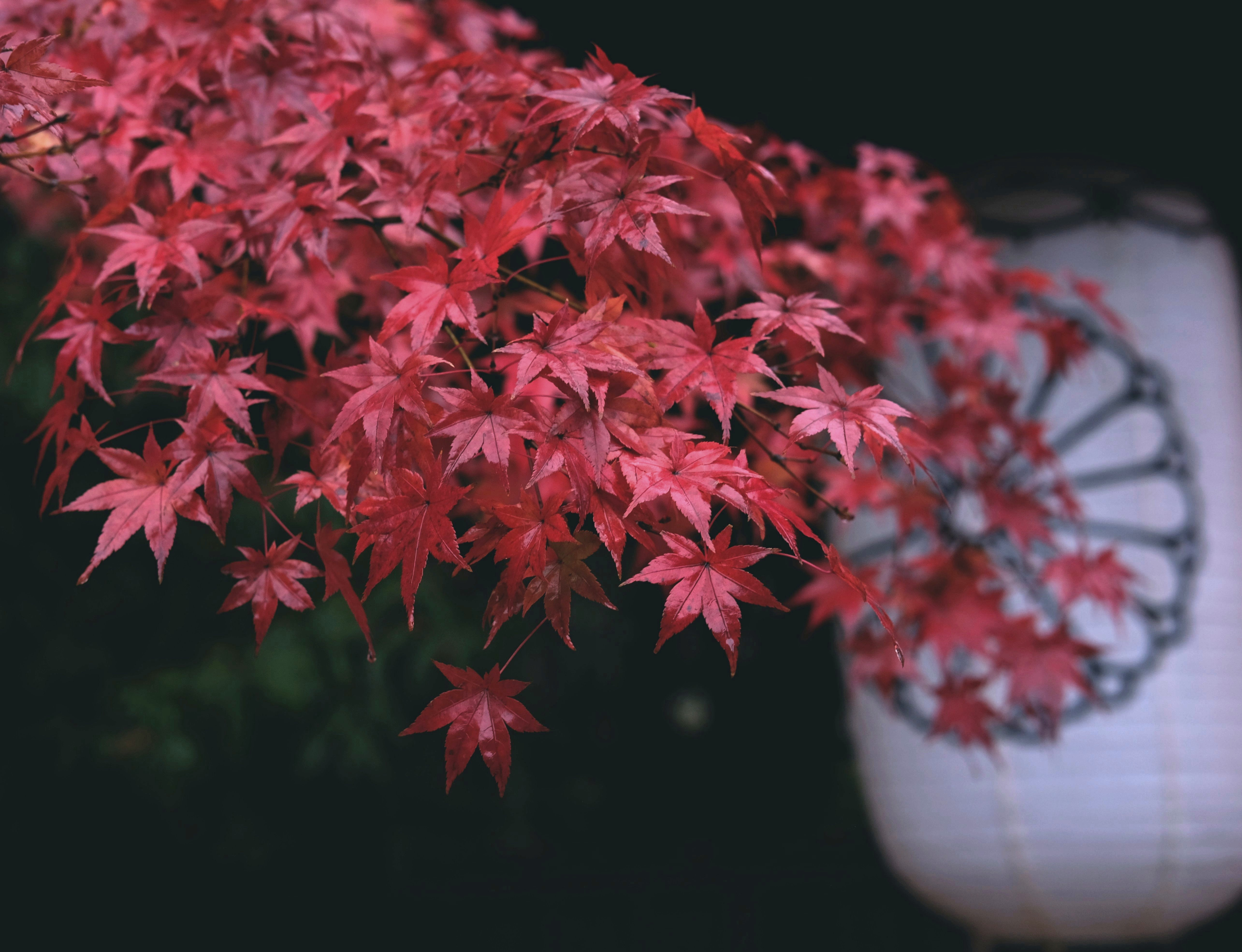
Shimogamo-jinja

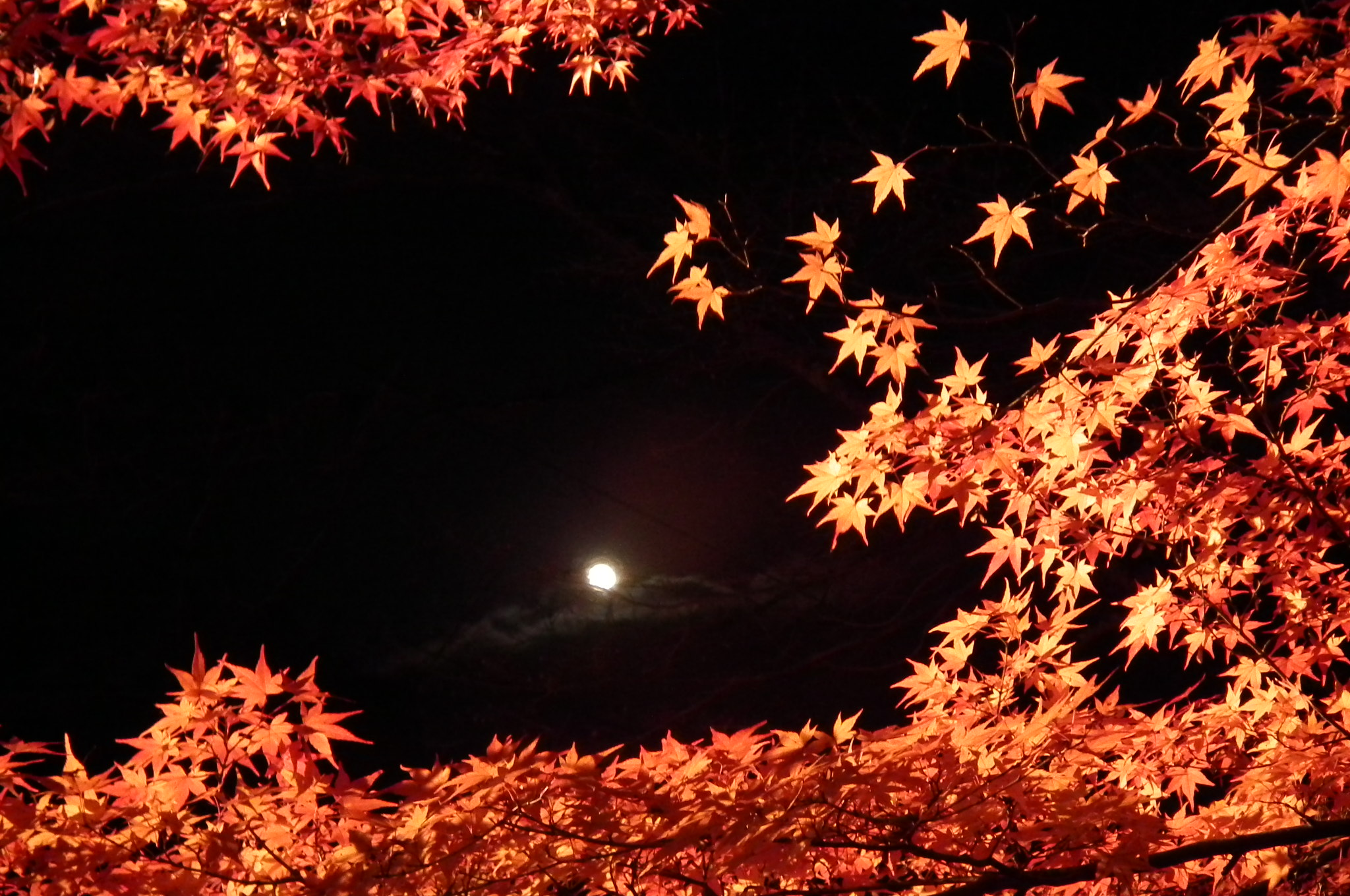
Nison-in

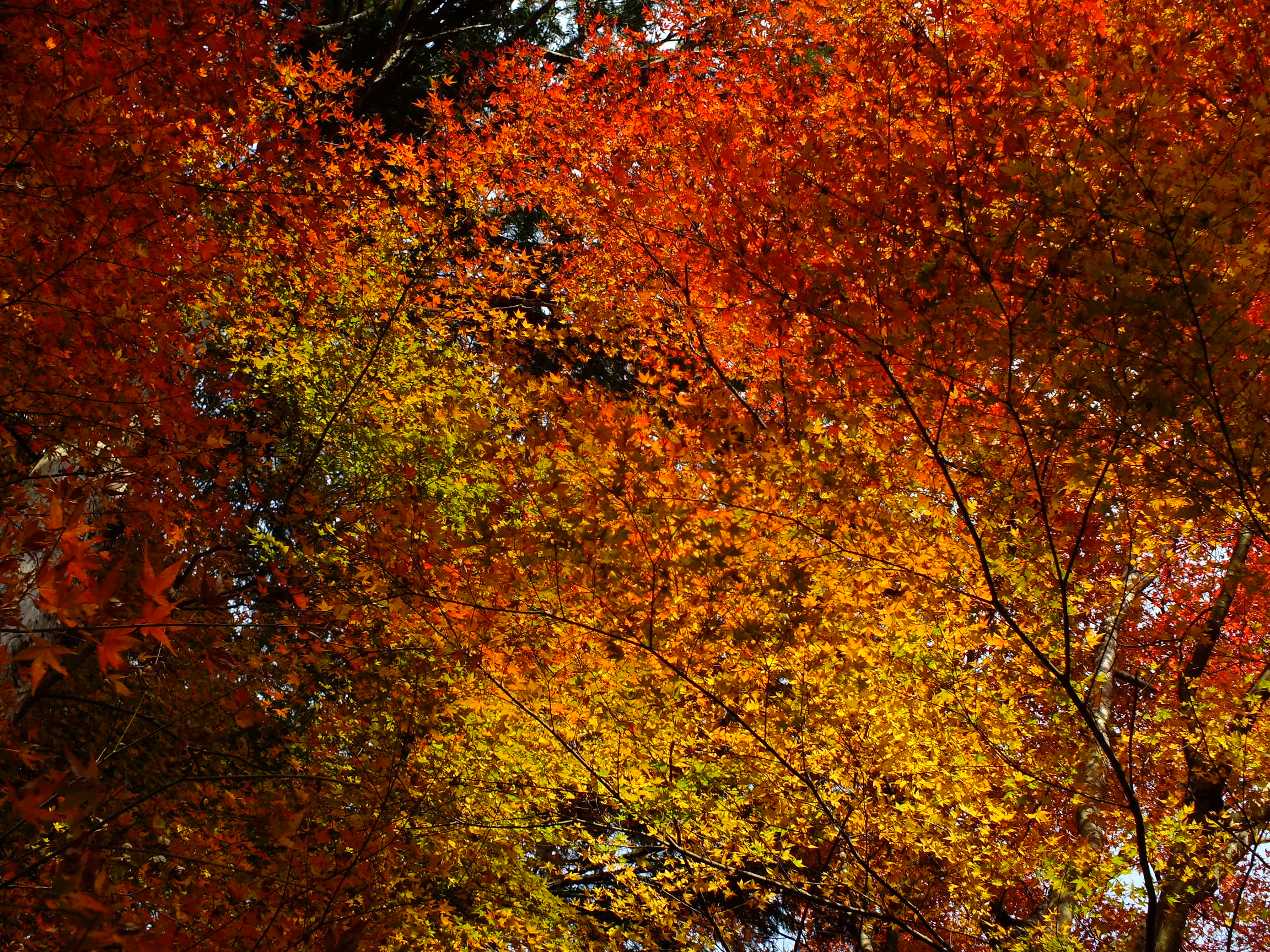
In Japan, people have long admired the gradation of colors of the leaves during the autumn foliage season.

Acer palmatum has been cultivated in Japan for centuries and in temperate areas around the world since the 1800s. The first specimen of the tree reached Britain in 1821.

When Swedish doctor-botanist Carl Peter Thunberg traveled in Japan late in the eighteenth century, he produced drawings of a small tree that would eventually become synonymous with the high art of oriental gardens. He gave it the species name palmatum after the hand-like shape of its leaves, similar to the centuries-old Japanese names kaede and momiji, references to the 'hands' of frogs and babies, respectively.

Japanese horticulturalists have long developed cultivars from maples found in Japan and nearby Korea and China. They are a popular choice for bonsai enthusiasts and have long been a subject in art.

Numerous cultivars are popular in Europe and North America, with red-leafed favored, followed by cascading green shrubs with deeply dissected leaves.

Acer palmatum includes thousands of named cultivars with a variety of forms, colors, leaf types, sizes, and preferred growing conditions. Heights of mature specimens range from 0.5 to 25 m (1 ^{1}/_{2} to 82 ft), depending on type.

Preparations from the branches and leaves are used as a treatment in traditional Chinese medicine. The leaves are edible; a local dish originating from Minoh, momiji tempura, involves pickling the leaves for a year before coating them in flour, sesame seeds and sugar, then deep frying them.

=== Growing conditions ===
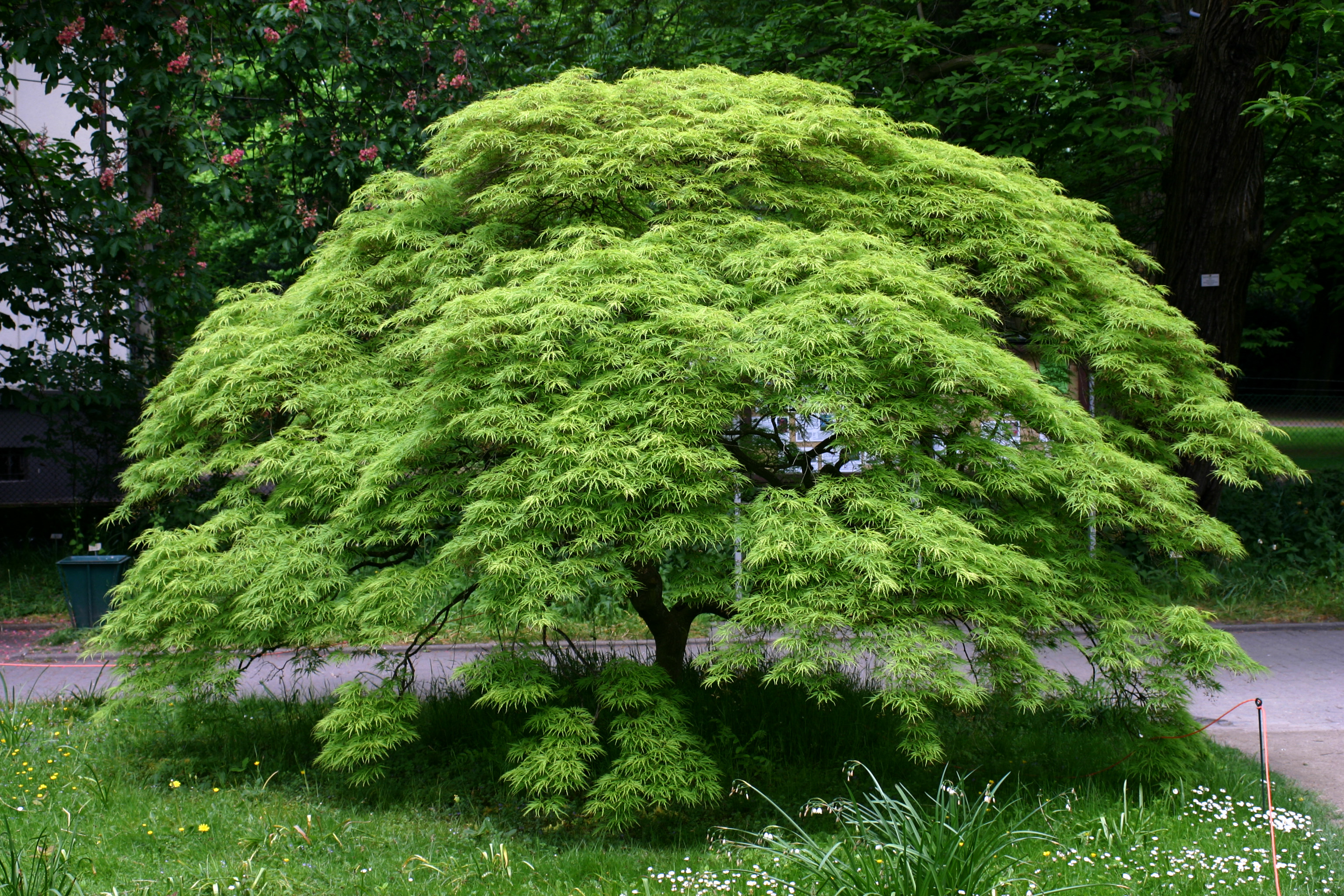
This mature specimen displays the characteristic dome-like canopy.

In their natural habitat, they grow in the understory; most cultivars prefer part shade, especially in hotter climates, but they will also grow in heavy shade. Some cultivars will tolerate full sun, more so at higher latitudes and less at lower latitudes; red, purple-red, black-red, bronze, and some dark green cultivars are generally more full sun tolerant. Variegated white, cream, yellow, yellow-orange, or light green cultivars mostly require shade protection. Almost all are adaptable and blend well with companion plants. The trees are particularly suitable for borders and ornamental paths because the root systems are compact and not invasive. Many varieties of Acer palmatum are successfully grown in containers. Trees are prone to die during periods of drought and prefer consistent water conditions; more established trees are less prone to drought. Moderate to well-drained soil is essential as they will not survive in poorly drained waterlogged soil. Trees do not require heavy fertilization and should only be very lightly fertilized.

Japanese maples are best to grow in hardiness zones 5–8.

=== Pruning ===
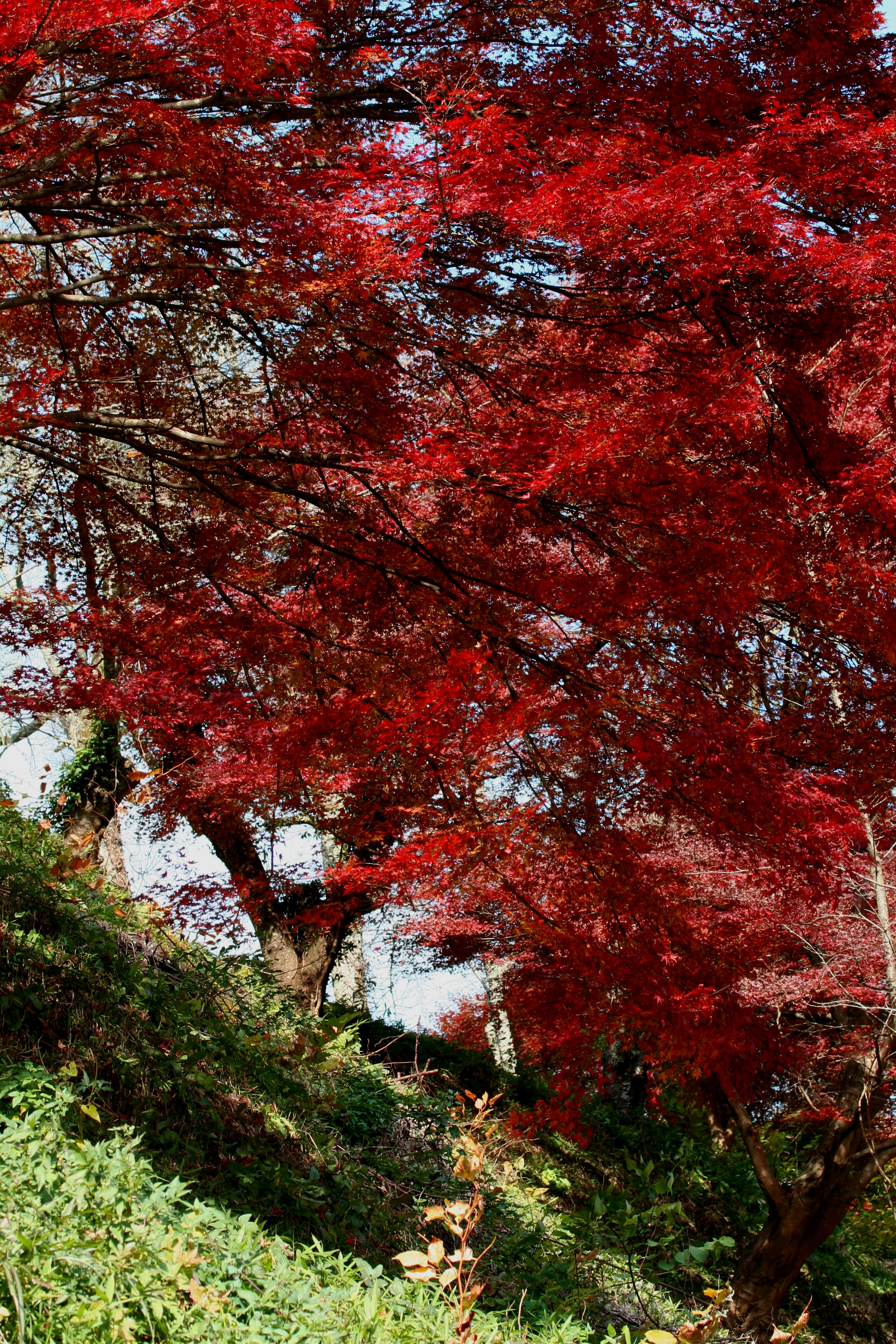
Fall, Nara

If space is not a constraint, no pruning is necessary except to remove any dead branches. Trees naturally self-prune foliage that doesn't receive enough light, such as internal branches which are overly shaded by its own canopy. Some growers prefer to shape their trees artistically or to thin out interior branches to better expose the graceful main branches. The form of the tree, especially without leaves in winter, can be of great interest and can be pruned to highlight this feature. Trees heal readily after pruning without needing aftercare. This species should not be pruned like a hedge, but instead methodically shaped by carefully choosing individual branches to remove. They can also be pruned just to maintain a smaller size to suit a particular location. Acer palmatum can also be used as espalier.

=== Cultivars ===
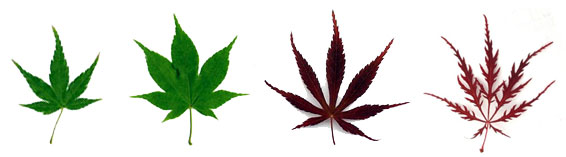
Various cultivars

Over 1,000 cultivars have been chosen for particular characteristics, which are propagated by asexual reproduction most often by grafting, but some cultivars can also be propagated by budding, cuttings, tissue culture, or layering. Some cultivars are not in cultivation in the Western world or have been lost over the generations, but many new cultivars are developed each decade. Cultivars are chosen for phenotypical aspects such as leaf shape and size (shallowly to deeply lobed, some also palmately compound), leaf color (ranging from chartreuse through dark green or from orange to red, to dark purple, others variegated with various patterns of white and pink), bark texture and color, and growth pattern. Most cultivars are less vigorous and smaller than is typical for the species, but are more interesting than the relatively mundane species. Cultivars come in a large variety of forms including upright, broom, vase, umbrella, weeping, cascading, dwarf, shrub, and ground cover. Most cultivars are artificially selected from seedlings of open-pollinated plants, purposeful breeding is not common, and less often from grafts of witch's brooms.

In Japan, iromomiji is used as an accent tree in Japanese gardens, providing gentle shade next to the house in the summer and beautiful colors in autumn. Many cultivars have characteristics that come into prominence during different seasons, including the color of new or mature leaves, extraordinary autumn color, color and shape of samaras, or even bark that becomes more brightly colored during the winter. Some cultivars can scarcely be distinguished from others unless labeled. In some cases, identical cultivars go by different names, while in other cases, different cultivars may be given the same name.

==== Popular cultivars ====
A selection of notable or popular cultivars, with brief notes about characteristics that apply during at least one season, includes the following. agm indicates the cultivar has gained the Royal Horticultural Society's Award of Garden Merit.

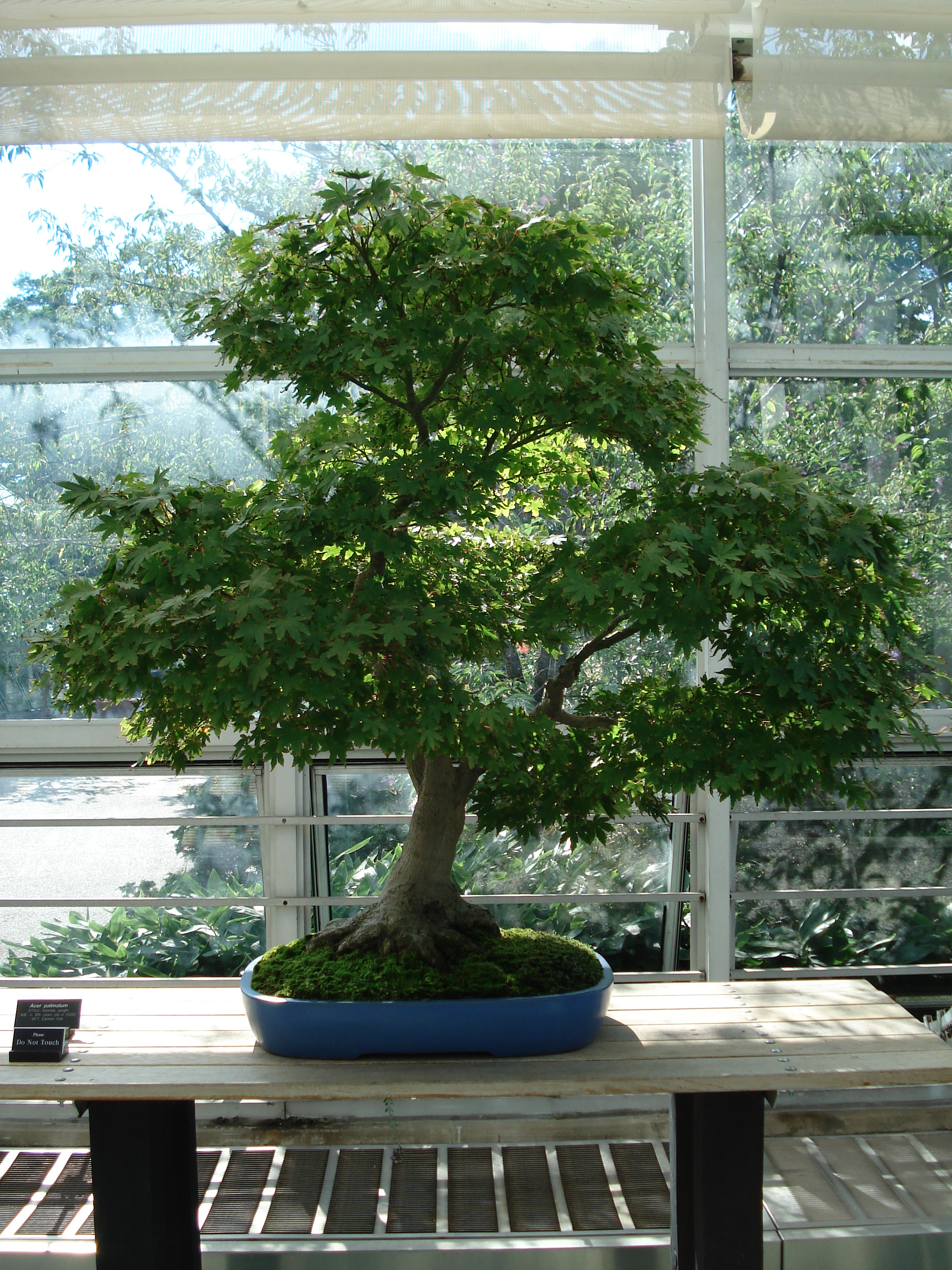
A 112+ year-old bonsai at the Brooklyn Botanic Garden

- 'Aka shigitatsu sawa'; pinkish-white leaves with green veins
- 'Ao ba jo'; a dwarf with bronze-green summer foliage
- 'Arakawa'; Upright vigorous growth with an exceptional rough bark that makes it very sought after for bonsai.

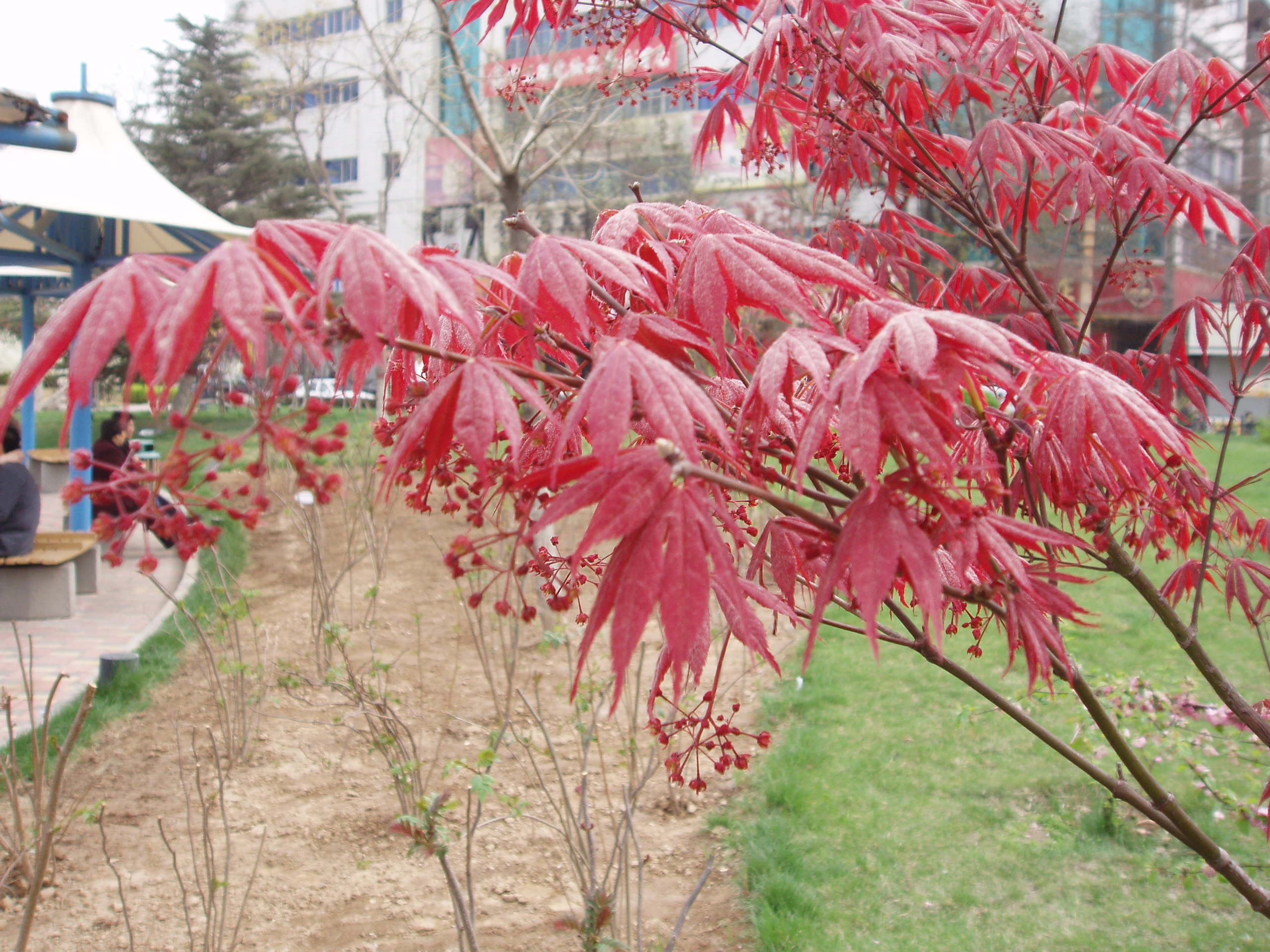
Popular red-foliaged cultivars include 'Atropurpureum' and 'Bloodgood'.

- 'Atropurpureum'; wine-red, including new branches (see 'Dissectum Atropurpureum'); original cultivar lost and diluted by use of the name to market seedlings of a similar look.
- 'Beni-malko'; agm
- 'Beni-tsukasa'; agm
- 'Bloodgood'; agm; a cultivar of 'Atropurpureum', vigorous growth, large size, a classic cultivar, but supplanted by improved similar selections like 'Emperor I' and 'Fireglow'.
- 'Burgundy Lace'; agm
- 'Butterfly'; Small upright tree form for shade, slow growing, small palmate leaves variegated with white borders and a bluish-green tint, pink hues show up during spring and fall.
- 'Bodhi Pink'; pink tint, Green hues show up during spring and fall.
- 'Chitose-Yama'; agm
- 'Crimson Queen'; (see var. dissectum 'Crimson Queen')
- 'Deshojo'; Its brilliant red foliage colors in the spring and fall, as well as its cold hardiness make it very desirable. The 'Shin-deshojo' variety improved its appealing aspects even further.
- 'Dissectum'; lace-like leaves, drooping habit
- 'Dissectum Atropurpureum';
- var. dissectum 'Crimson Queen'; agm
- var. dissectum 'Garnet'; agm
- var. dissectum 'Inaba-shidare'; agm
- var. dissectum 'Seiryu'; agm a green, tree-like shrub with finely dissected leaves
- 'Elegans'; agm
- 'Emperor 1'; One of the best red amoenums, similar to 'Bloodgood', but slightly smaller size, holds a deep red color even in shade and summer heat.
- 'Garnet'; (see var. dissectum 'Garnet')
- 'Golden Pond'; greenish-yellow summer foliage
- 'Goshiki koto hime'; a delicate, variegated dwarf
- 'Higasa yama'; crinkled leaves variegated with yellow
- 'Hogyuko'; rich green leaves, turning orange in autumn
- 'Hupp's Dwarf'; a small, dense shrub with miniature leaves
- 'Inaba-shidare'; (see var. dissectum 'Inaba-shidare')
- 'Issai nishiki kawazu'; very rough, rigid bark
- 'Jerre Schwartz'; dwarf variety, toothed, deeply lobed, mid-dark green leaves, flushed pink and then bronze-green in spring, turning red in autumn.
- 'Kagiri nishiki'; similar to 'Butterfly' but more pinkish tones
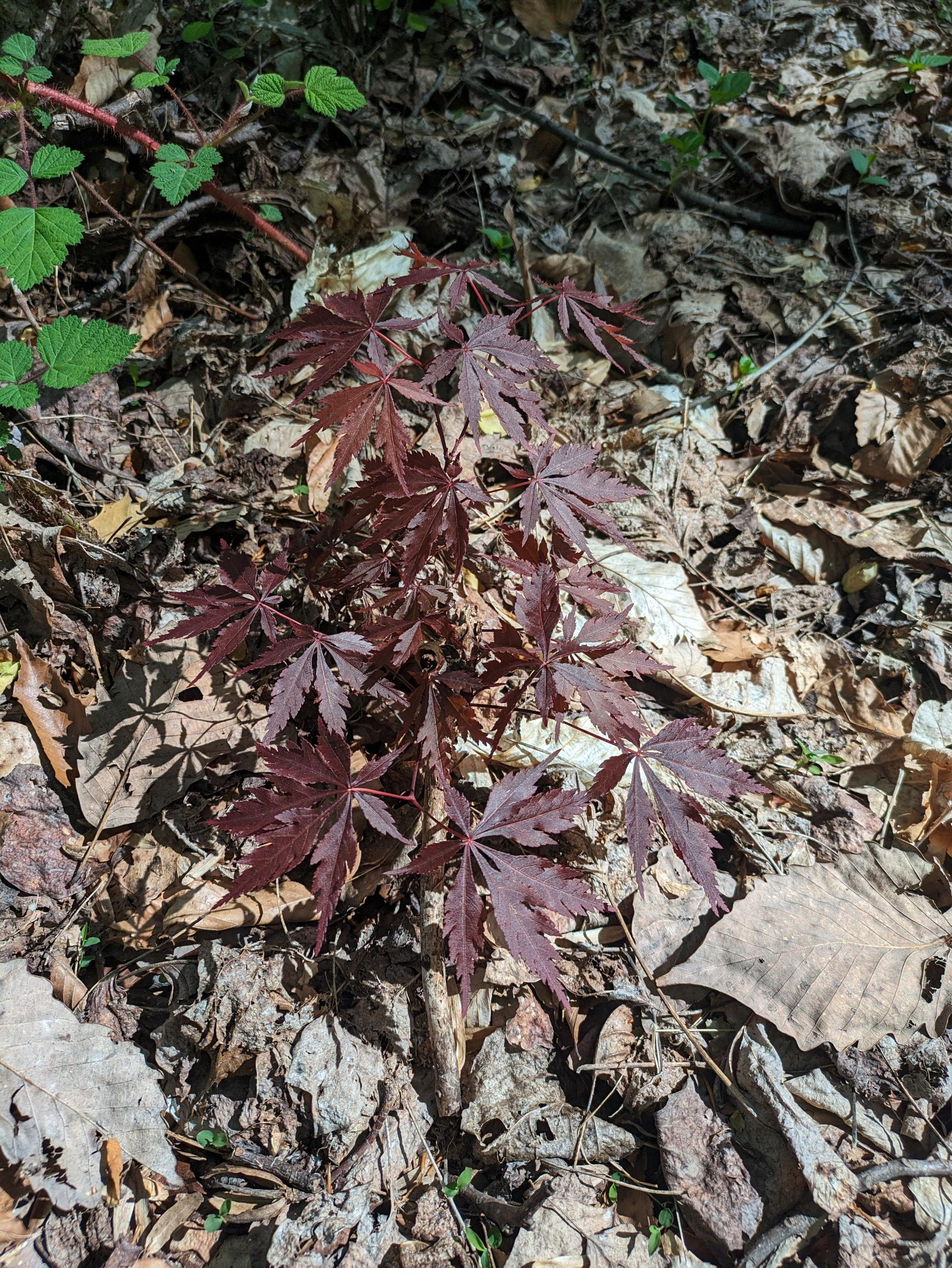
- Feral red cultivar of Japanese maple in Cromwell Valley Park, MD.
  'Karasu gawa'; slow-growing variegate with brilliant pink and white
- 'Katsura'; agm yellow-green leaves tipped with orange
- 'Koto no ito'; light green, thread-like leaves
- 'Little Princess'; a sparsely branched dwarf with irregular habit
- 'Mama'; a bushy dwarf with extremely variable foliage
- 'Masu murasaki'; a shrubby tree with purple leaves
- 'Mikawa Yatsubusa'; slow growing, with leaves imbricated and dense, giving a unique distinctive look that reminds topiary.
- 'Mizu kuguri'; orange-tinted new growth and very wide habit
- 'Nigrum'; deep purple leaves turning to crimson
- 'Nishiki gawa'; pinetree-like bark desirable for bonsai
- 'Nomura nishiki'; dark purple, lace-like leaves
- 'Ojishi'; tiny dwarf, grows only a few centimetres per year
- 'Orange Dream'; agm an ssp. palmatum cultivar, with small leaves yellow with orange in spring, green in summer, orange-yellow in autumn. Bark bright green
- 'Orangeola'; An excellent cultivar of the weeping shrub form, prized for its dynamic color which changes constantly throughout the season. agm
- 'Ornatum'; agm
- 'Osakazuki'; agm tree-like shrub with spectacular autumn colour, 4 metres (13 ft) tall, green leaves.
- 'Peaches and Cream'; similar to 'Aka shigitatsu sawa'
- 'Pink Filigree'; finely dissected, brownish-pink leaves
- 'Pung kil'; Improved selection of the 'linearlobum' types; thin-lobed purple-red leaves, good color retention. Even the new growth displays the linearlobum type leaf form.
- 'Red Dragon'; One of the finest of the lace-leaf weeping umbrella-shaped forms. Similar to 'Crimson Queen', but smaller overall size and with better red color retention into the summer heat.
- 'Red Filigree Lace'; Dwarf sized umbrella-shaped weeping form, extra finely dissected delicate dark purple leaves, slow growth rate.
- 'Red Pygmy'; agm
- 'Sango kaku'; agm Coral-bark maple (formerly 'Senkaki'); with pinkish-red bark
- 'Seiryu'; (see var. dissectum 'Seiryu')
- 'Shaina'; a dwarf sport from 'Bloodgood'
- 'Shin-deshojo'; Translates to "New-Deshojo" is an improved, more vigorous selection of the 'coralinum' type ssp. palmatum cultivars. It retains its more vibrant spring color longer even in summer months. It is also more sun tolerant and has a more compact habit. One of the best cultivars for bonsai.agm
- 'Shikage ori nishiki'; vase-shaped shrub with dull purple foliage
- 'Shishigashira'; a unique cultivar, notable for its growth habit similar to a puffy cloud or lion's mane, and its crinkled thick leaves. agm
- 'Skeeter's Broom'; derived from a 'Bloodgood' witch's broom
- 'Tamukeyama'; finely dissected, dark purple, cascading habit
- 'Trompenburg'; agm slender, upright grower, convex lobes, purple leaves
- 'Tsuma gaki'; yellow leaves with reddish-purple borders
- 'Villa Taranto'; agm
- 'Yuba e'; upright tree with scarlet variegation

In addition to the cultivars described above, a number of cultivar groups have been naturally selected over time to such an extent that seedlings often resemble the parent. Many of these are sold under the same name as the cultivars, or even propagated by grafting, so there is often much ambiguity in distinguishing them. In particular, a number of dark-red Acer palmatum are sold with the names 'Atropurpureum' and 'Bloodgood'. Many different cultivars with delicate lace-like foliage are sold under names such as 'Dissectum', 'Filigree' and 'Laceleaf'.

=== Similar species ===
The term "Japanese maple" is also sometimes used to describe other species, usually within the series Palmata, that are similar to A. palmatum and native to China, Korea or Japan, including:

- Acer duplicatoserratum (syn. A. palmatum var. pubescens Li)
- Acer japonicum—downy Japanese maple
- Acer pseudosieboldianum—Korean maple
- Acer shirasawanum—fullmoon maple
- Acer sieboldianum—Siebold's maple
- Acer buergerianum—trident maple
- Acer circinatum—vine maple

Given that these maples are phenotypically variable within each species, and may hybridise with one another, distinguishing between them may be a matter of gradient speciation. In commercial propagation, A. palmatum is often used as rootstock for many of these other species.
