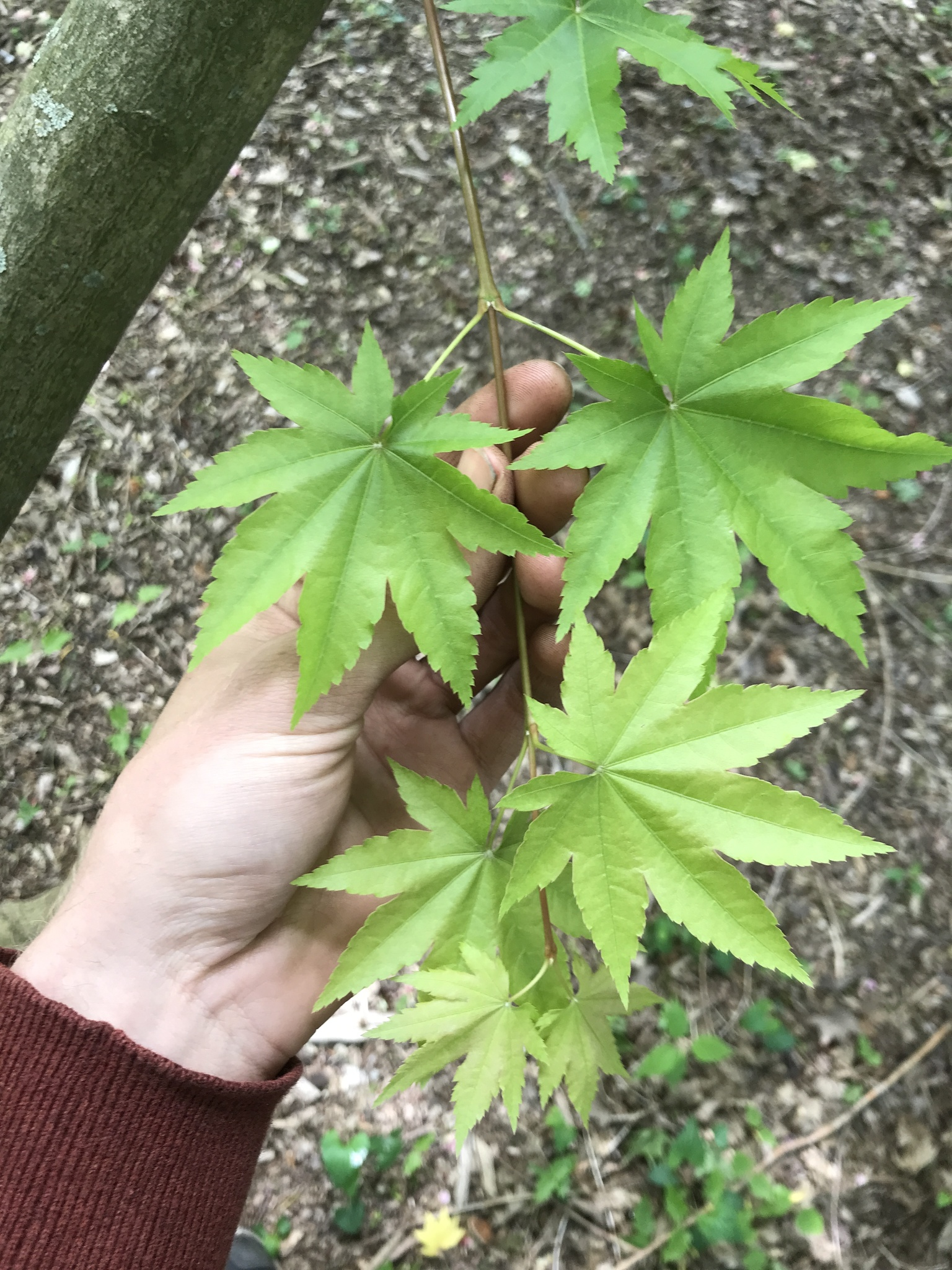

Conservation status
- Least Concern (IUCN 3.1)

Scientific classification
- Kingdom: Plantae
- Clade: Tracheophytes
- Clade: Angiosperms
- Clade: Eudicots
- Clade: Rosids
- Order: Sapindales
- Family: Sapindaceae
- Genus: Acer
- Section: Acer sect. Palmata
- Series: Acer ser. Palmata
- Species: A. duplicatoserratum

Binomial name
- Acer duplicatoserratum Hayata 1911

Synonyms
- Acer duplicato-serratum Hayata; Acer ceriferum Rehder; Acer duplicatoserratum var. chinense C.S.Chang; Acer linganense W.P.Fang & P.L.Chiu; Acer palmatum subsp. pubescens (H.L.Li) A.E.Murray

= Acer duplicatoserratum =

Species of maple

Acer duplicatoserratum is a species of maple, native to southern and eastern mainland China (Anhui, Fujian, Guizhou, Henan, Hubei, Hunan, Jiangsu, Jiangxi, Shandong, Zhejiang) and Taiwan.

Acer duplicatoserratum is a small tree, in the same group of maples as Acer palmatum. The leaves are palmately lobed with seven to nine lobes, 2.3–10 centimetres (0.91–3.94 in) long and 3–10 centimetres (1.2–3.9 in) broad.

There are two varieties:

- Acer duplicatoserratum var. duplicatoserratum. Taiwan, endemic; listed as Vulnerable. It occurs in submontane broadleaved forest scattered in central to northern parts of the island. Its altitudinal range is 1,000–2,000 m (3,300–6,600 ft). Leaf petioles always pubescent.
- Acer duplicatoserratum var. chinense C.S.Chang. Mainland China, in deciduous forests at elevations of 200–1,500 metres (660–4,920 ft) asl. Leaf petioles pubescent only when young, becoming hairless as they grow.
