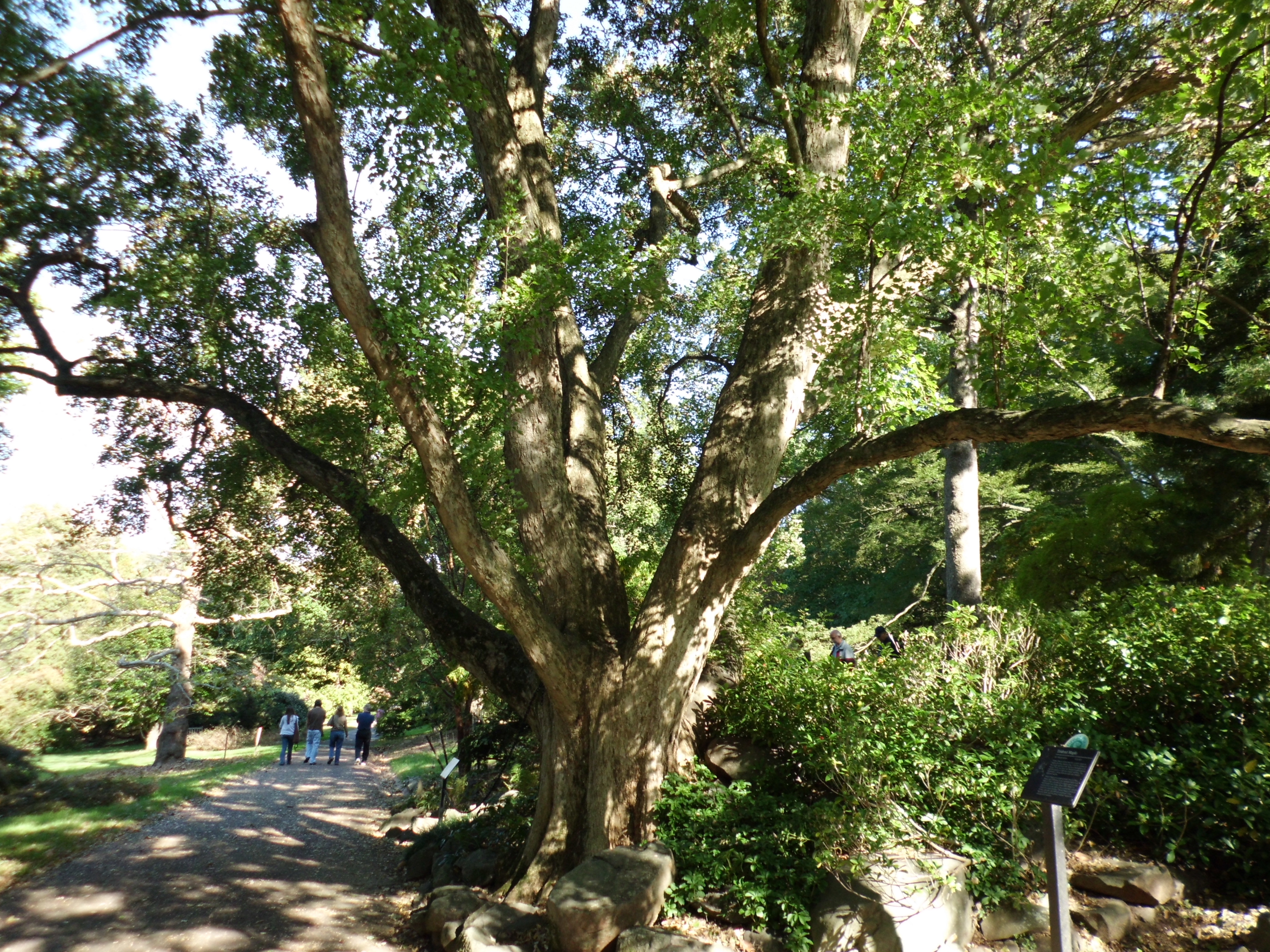

Scientific classification
- Kingdom: Plantae
- Clade: Embryophytes
- Clade: Tracheophytes
- Clade: Spermatophytes
- Clade: Angiosperms
- Clade: Eudicots
- Clade: Rosids
- Order: Sapindales
- Family: Sapindaceae
- Genus: Acer
- Section: Acer sect. Pentaphylla
- Series: Acer ser. Trifida
- Species: A. buergerianum

Binomial name
- Acer buergerianum Miq. 1865

Synonyms
- Acer lingii W.P.Fang; Acer subtrilobum (K.Koch) Koidz.; Acer trifidum Hook. & Arn. 1833 not Thunb. 1784; Acer trinerve Siesmayer; Acer ningpoense (Hance) W.P.Fang

= Acer buergerianum =

Trident maple

Species of plant

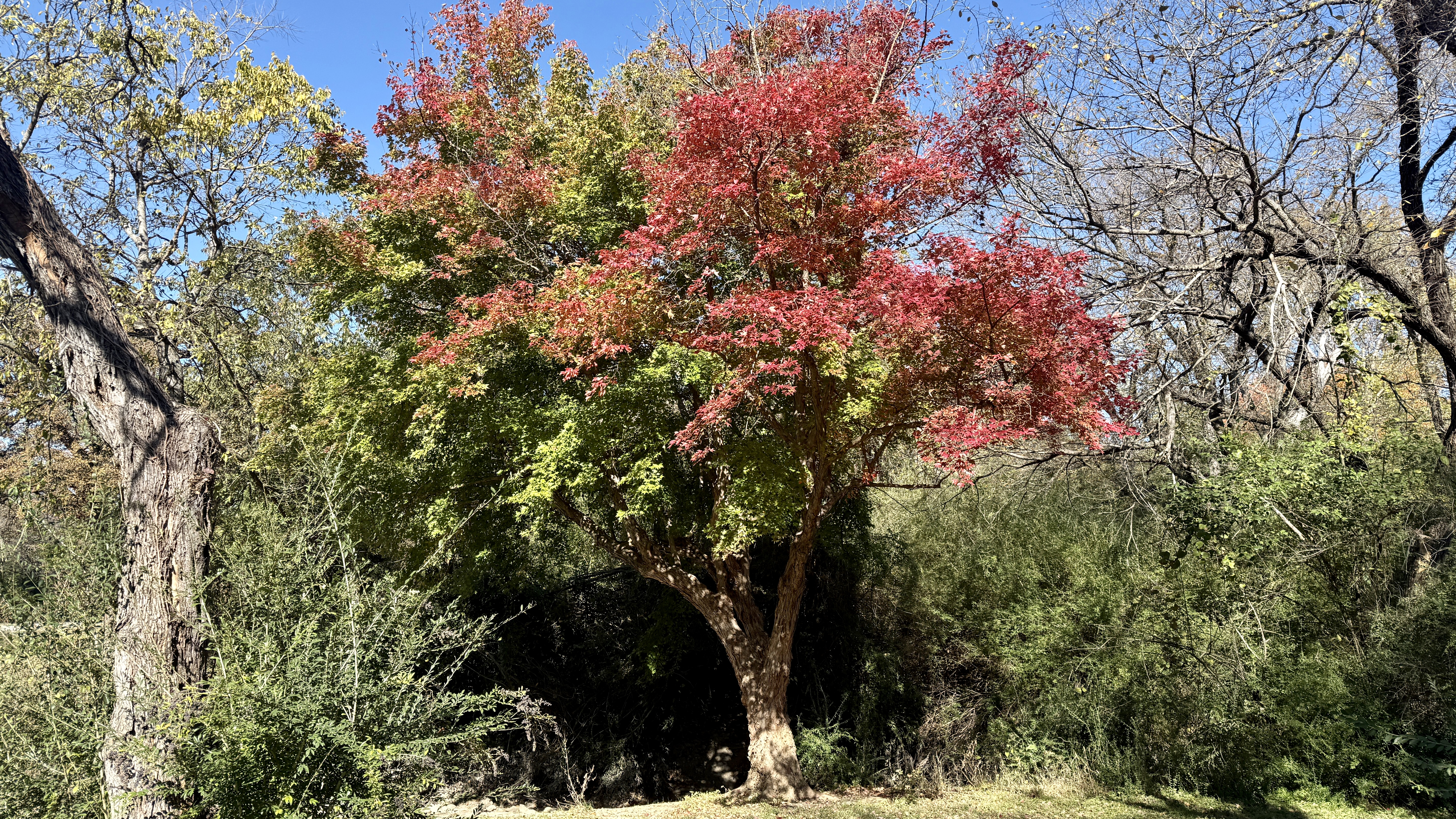
Trident Maple in Fort Worth, Texas

Acer buergerianum (trident maple; simplified Chinese: 三角枫; traditional Chinese: 三角楓; pinyin: sānjiǎofēng) is a species of maple native to eastern China (from Shandong west to southeastern Gansu, south to Guangdong, and southwest to Sichuan), Taiwan and Japan. The specific epithet is a patronym honoring Dutch plant hunter J. Buerger (1804-1858).

== Description ==
It is a small to medium-sized deciduous tree reaching a height of 5–20 m with a trunk up to 50 cm diameter. The leaves are in opposite pairs, 2.5–8 cm long (excluding the 2–5 cm petiole) and 3.5–6.5 cm broad, hard, glossy dark green above, paler below, usually with three lobes; on mature trees the lobes forward-pointing and with smooth margins, on young trees with more spreading lobes and serrated margins. The flowers are produced in spring, yellow-green, in pendulous corymbs; they are small, with five greenish sepals and five yellow-white petals about 2 mm long, and eight stamens. The fruit is a samara with two winged seeds, each seed 4–7 mm diameter, with a 15 mm wing; the wings are forward-pointing and often overlapping each other.

The species is variable, and a number of varieties have been described:

- Acer buergerianum var. buergerianum. Hubei, Hunan, Jiangsu, Jiangxi, Shandong, Zhejiang.
- Acer buergerianum var. jiujiangense Z.X.Yu. Jiangxi.
- Acer buergerianum var. horizontale F.P.Metcalf. Southern Zhejiang.
- Acer buergerianum var. formosanum (Hayata ex Koidzumi) Sasaki. Taiwan (endemic).
- Acer buergerianum var. kaiscianense (Pampanini) W.P.Fang. Gansu, Hubei, Shaanxi.
- Acer buergerianum var. yentangense W.P.Fang & M.Y.Fang. Zhejiang.

A few trees have consistently unlobed leaves; these were first described as a variety A. trifidum var. integrifolium Makino (A. trifidum is an old synonym of A. buergerianum), but are now not distinguished from the species. Occasional unlobed leaves also occur on most trees with otherwise normal three-lobed leaves.

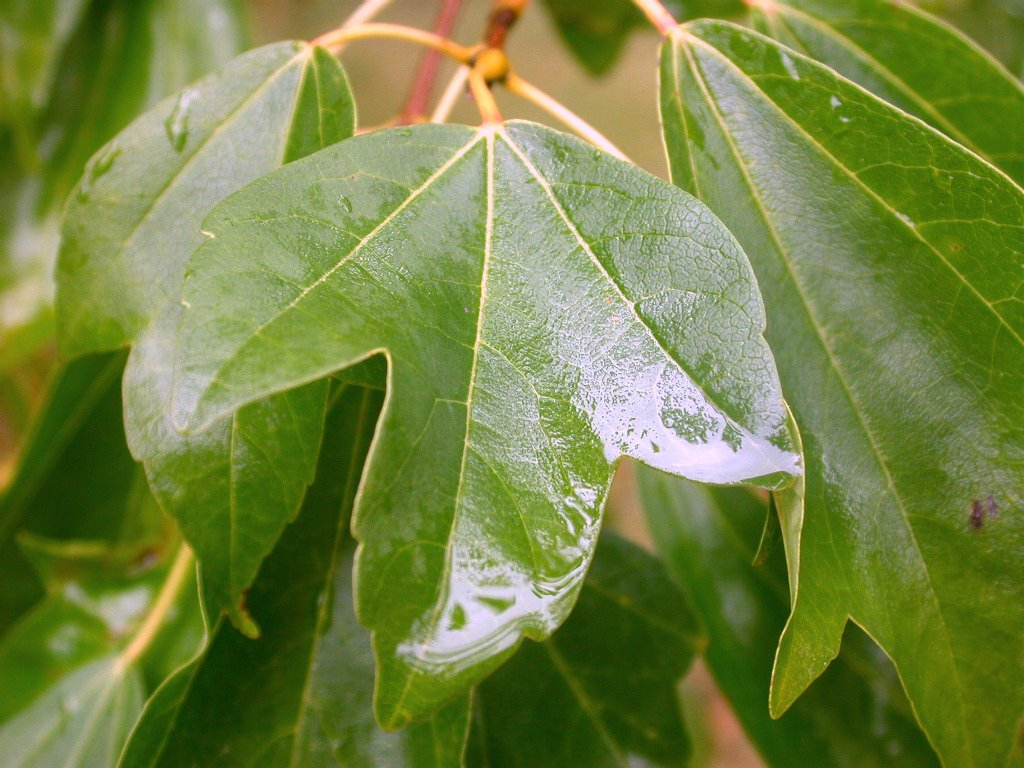
Leaf

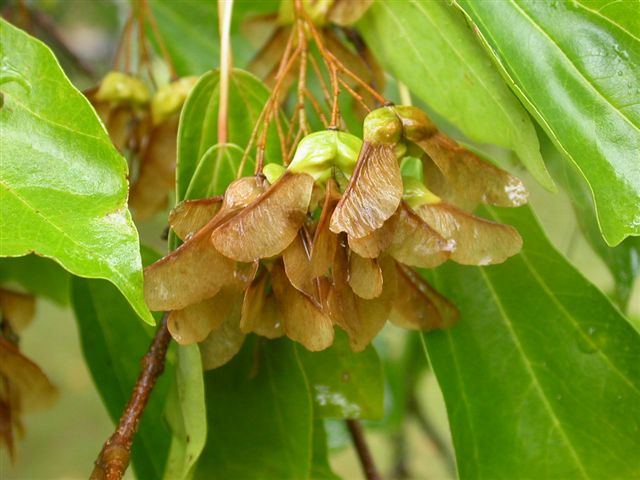
Seeds

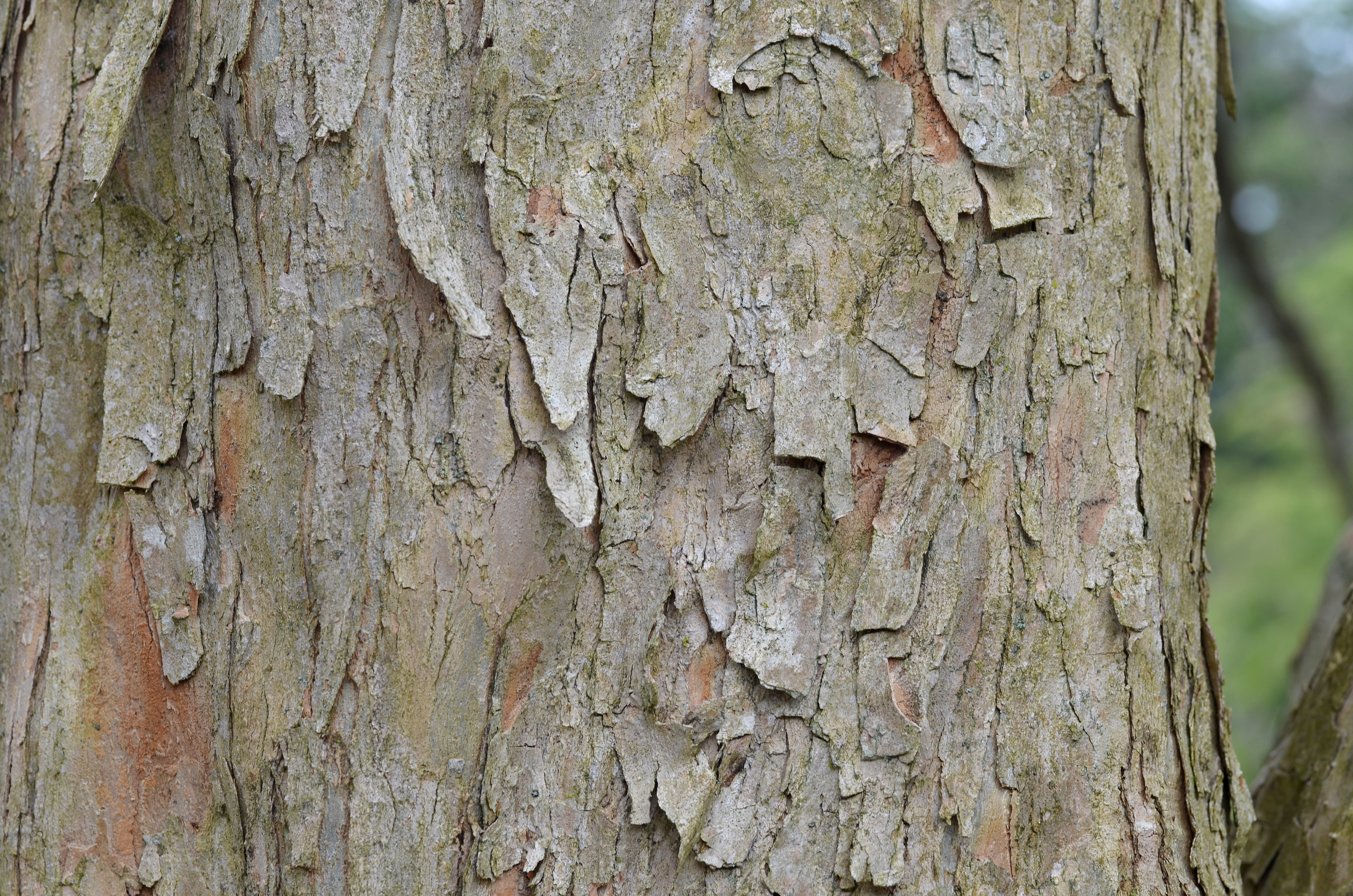
Bark

== Cultivation ==
It is widely grown in temperate regions as an ornamental tree. It was introduced very early to Japan, where its name translates as "China maple". More recently, it was introduced to Europe and North America in 1896, and is now occasionally grown in parks and large gardens there. Mature examples may be seen at Westonbirt Arboretum in England, the Esveld Aceretum in Boskoop, Netherlands, Arnold Arboretum in Boston, Massachusetts and many other locations.

=== Bonsai ===
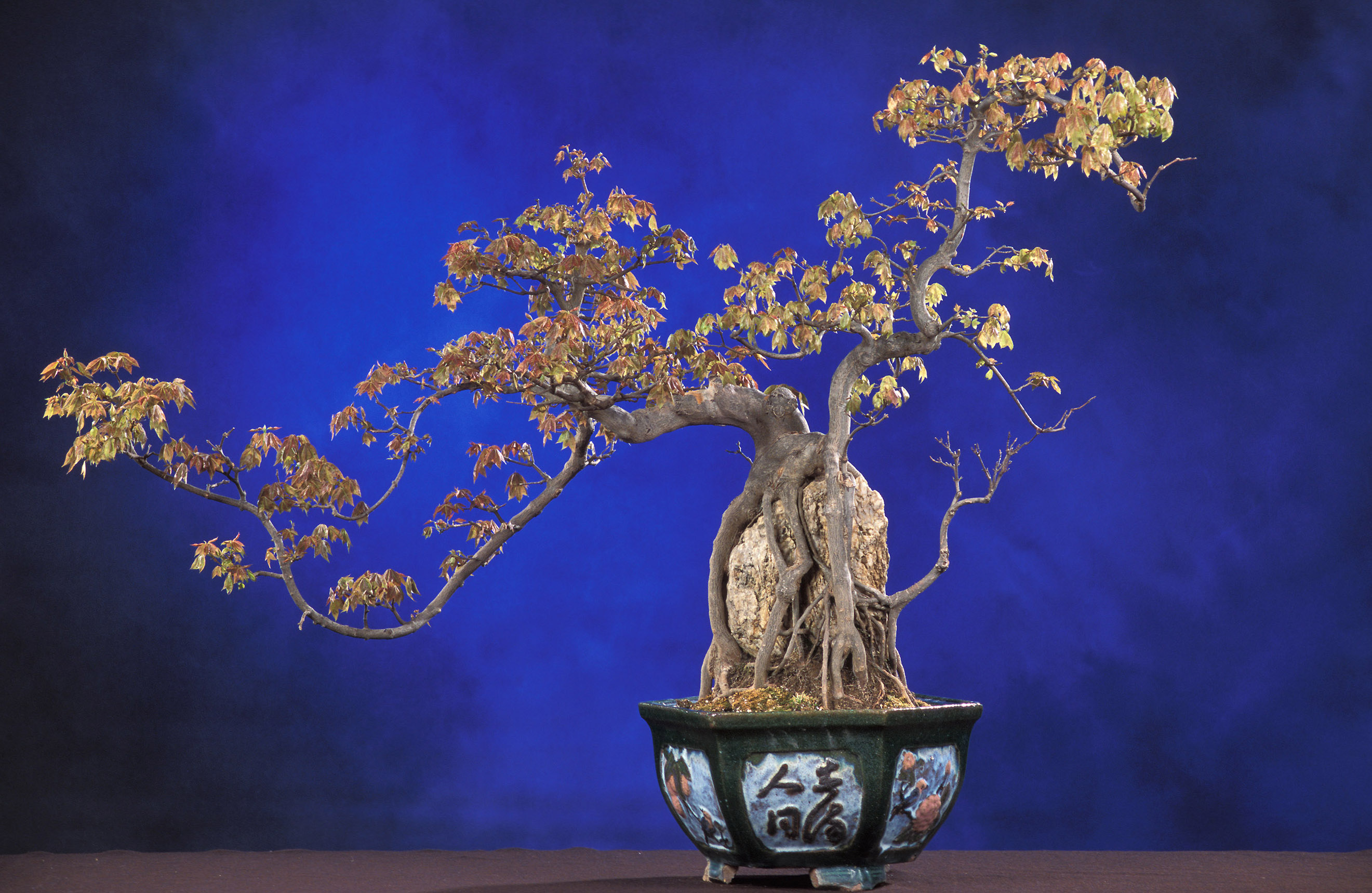
Trident maple bonsai

Trident maple is a popular choice for the art of bonsai and responds well to techniques that create leaf reduction and ramification. It is suitable for many style and sizes of bonsai.

=== Cultivars ===
Several interesting cultivars have been developed, many of these bear Japanese names. Notable cultivars include 'Goshiki Kaede' (striking pink and green variegation), 'Kifu Nishiki' (roundish, almost un-lobed leaves), 'Mino Yatsubusa' (dwarf with long, narrow leaves) 'Mitsubato Kaede' (distinctive cork-like trunk) and 'Naruto' (strongly incurved leaf surface).
