= Esveld Aceretum =

Arboretum in Boskoop, Netherlands

Coordinates: 52°05′09″N 04°40′32″E

Esveld Aceretum is (in the number of species and cultivars under cultivation at the site) the largest collection of maples in the world. The aceretum is part of PlantenTuin Esveld, a family-owned commercial nursery in Boskoop, Netherlands, that was founded in 1865.

The term "aceretum" describes an arboretum devoted to maple trees and shrubs, i.e. plants belonging to the genus Acer. The aceretum was founded in the early 1970s, anchored by a giant specimen of Acer shirasawanum that was already about one century old.

The aceretum now holds over 600 varieties of maples and is the holder of the Dutch Plant Collections of Acer. PlantenTuin Esveld is the holder of the national collections of several other Genus of plants as well.
