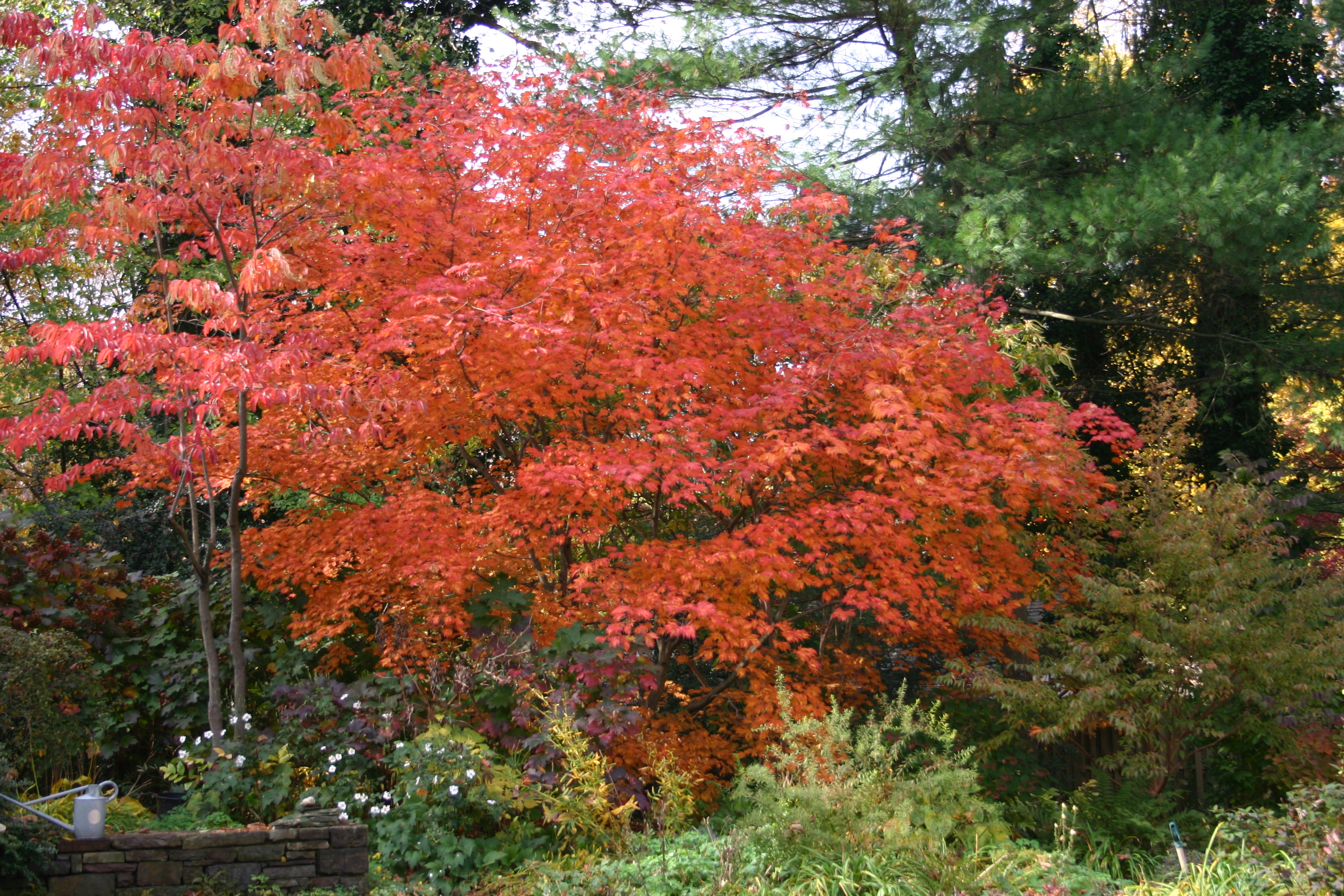
- Autumn foliage of A. japonicum 'Aconitifolium'
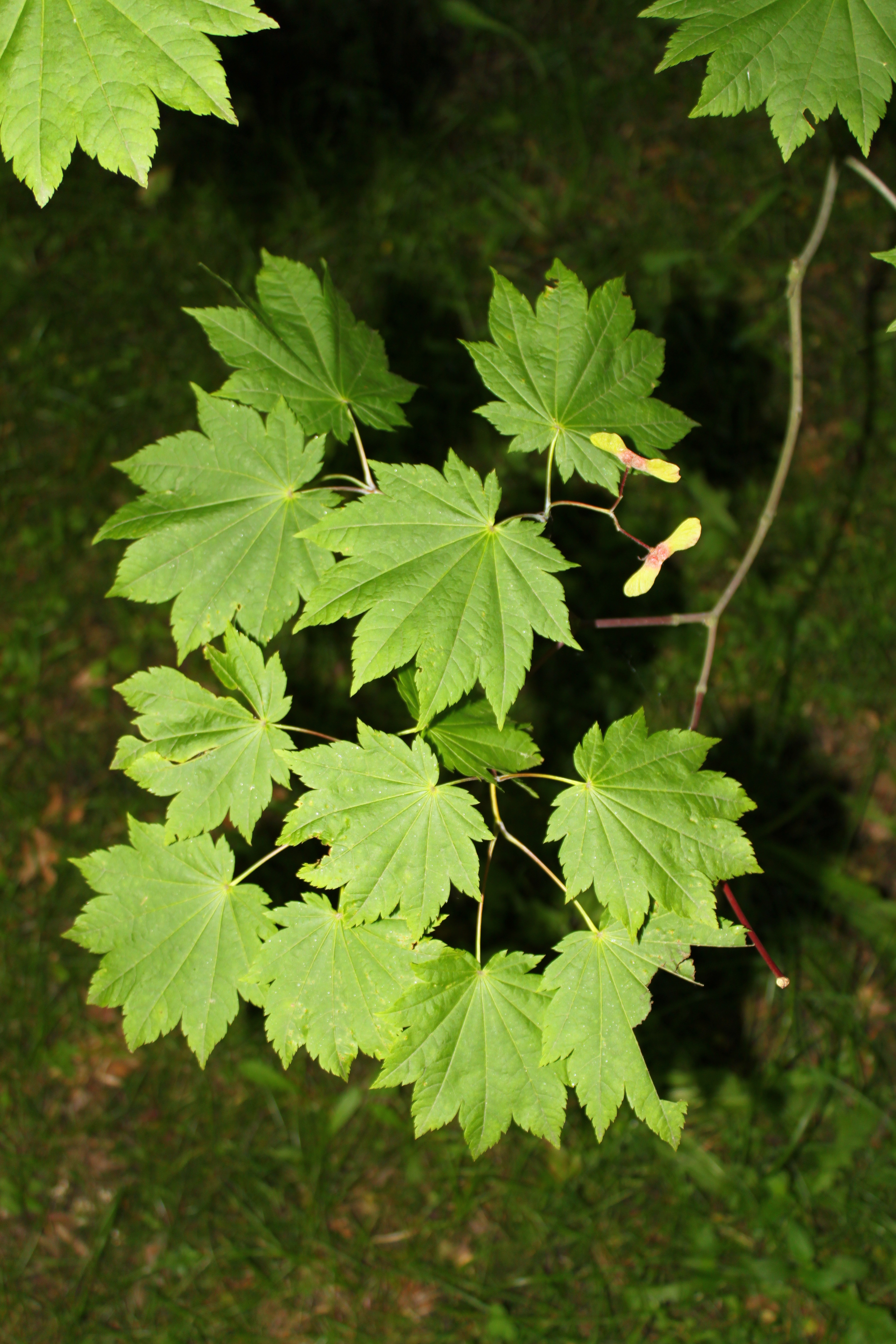

Scientific classification
- Kingdom: Plantae
- Clade: Tracheophytes
- Clade: Angiosperms
- Clade: Eudicots
- Clade: Rosids
- Order: Sapindales
- Family: Sapindaceae
- Genus: Acer
- Section: Acer sect. Palmata
- Series: Acer ser. Palmata
- Species: A. japonicum

Binomial name
- Acer japonicum Thunb. 1784

Synonyms
- List: Acer circumlobatum Maxim.; Acer heyhachii Matsum. ex Makino; Acer heyhachii Matsum.; Acer kobakoense Nakai; Acer monocarpon Nakai; Acer nudicarpum (Nakai) Nakai; Acer pseudosieboldianum var. nudicarpum (Nakai) Nakai

= Acer japonicum =

Species of maple

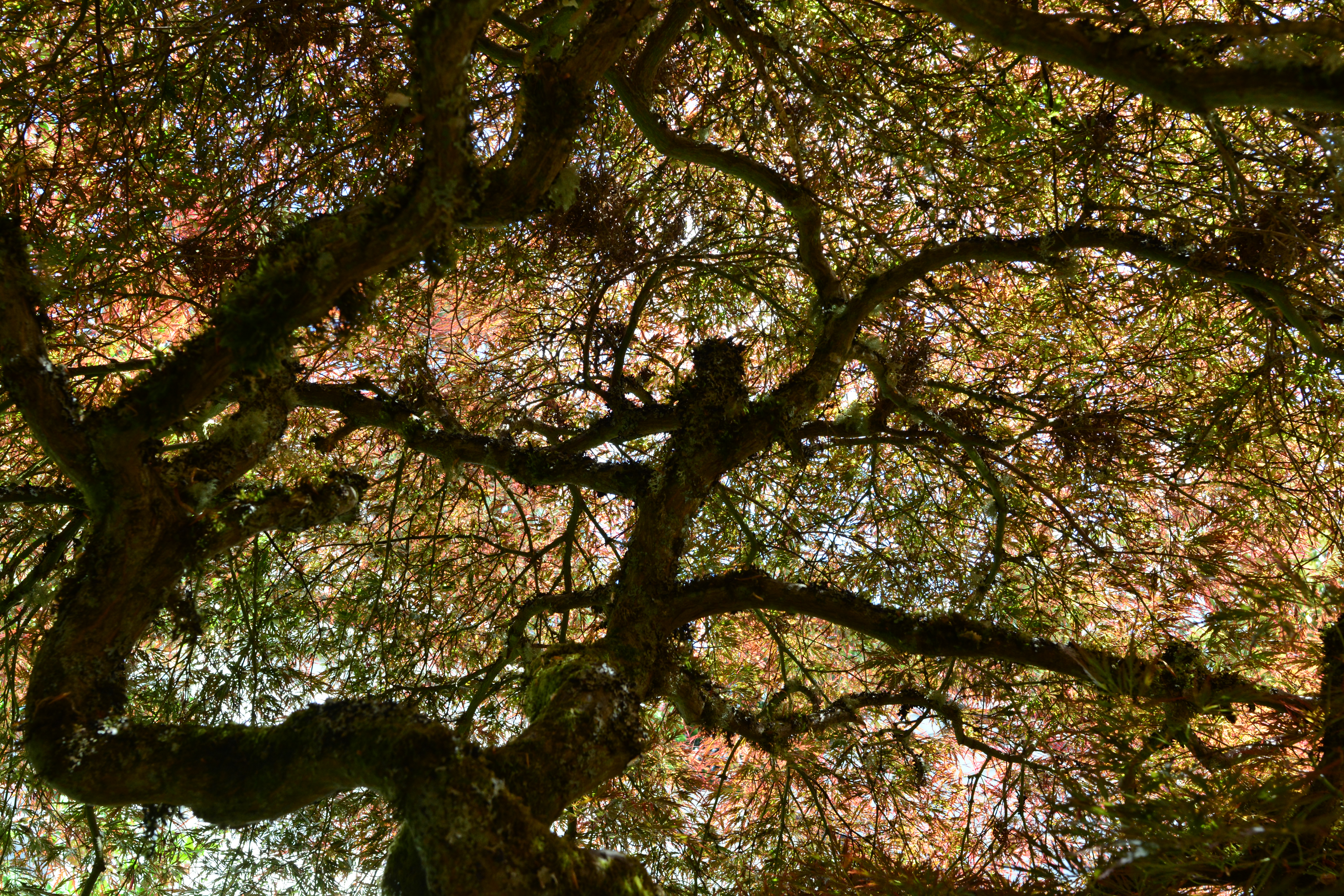
This roughly 50-year-old Acer japonicum cultivar is only about 2 metres (6.6 ft) tall, but has the branching structure of a large tree.

Acer japonicum, fullmoon maple, or downy Japanese-maple (Japanese: はうちは楓, romanized: hauchiwakaede), is a species of maple native to Japan, on Honshū, Hokkaidō, Kyūshū (Nagasaki Prefecture), and also southern Korea.

== Description ==
Acer japonicum is a small deciduous tree growing to 5–10 m (rarely 15 m) tall, with a trunk up to 40 cm in diameter. The bark is smooth on young trees, becoming rough and scaly on old trees. The shoots are slender, and thinly downy with whitish hairs. The leaves are rounded, 7–15 cm in diameter with 9–13 (rarely 7) serrate lobes incised to half or less of the diameter of the leaf; they are downy at first with white hairs, the hairs mostly lost by late summer except on the veins and the underside of the leaf; the petiole is 2–4 cm long and hairy. In autumn, the leaves turn bright orange to dark red. The flowers are 1 cm in diameter, dark purplish-red with five sepals and petals; they are produced 10–15 together in drooping corymbs in early spring as the leaves start to open. The fruit is a paired samara with the nutlets 7 mm in diameter with a 20–25 mm wing, hanging under the leaves.

== Cultivation ==
Acer japonicum is frequently cultivated as an ornamental plant in temperate regions of Europe, North America, and elsewhere, though much less commonly than Acer palmatum. In cultivation, it is often only a shrubby tree with multiple trunks joining at ground-level.

Its preferred growing conditions are similar to those of Acer palmatum, but it is sometimes considered more tolerant of cold, especially compared to the more delicate cultivars of the latter.

Numerous cultivars have been selected, some of which have their own common names (e.g. "grape-leaf maple" for Acer japonicum 'Vitifolium'). Other popular cultivars are 'Aconitifolium' ("downy Japanese maple") which has deeply incised leaves; and 'Green Cascade', with drooping to pendulous branches. All three cultivars have gained the Royal Horticultural Society's Award of Garden Merit. Because of their variation from the wild species, some cultivars are difficult to assign to species, and they have often been mis-labeled as cultivars of the other related species; notably 'Aureum' has commonly been cited as a cultivar of Acer japonicum, but is actually derived from Acer shirasawanum.

Cultivars of this maple are found in almost every maple collection including Esveld Aceretum (Boskoop, Netherlands) and the large Acer section of Arnold Arboretum (Boston, Massachusetts, USA). They are also common in more general collections of horticulture, such as Valley Gardens (Surrey, England).

== Similar species ==
The closely related species Acer shirasawanum (Japanese, オオイタヤメイゲツ ooitayameigetsu) from southern Japan is sometimes included as a subspecies of Acer japonicum. It is distinct in its hairless shoots, and usually smaller leaves. Another related species, Acer sieboldianum (Japanese: コハウチワカエデ kohauchiwakaede), is best distinguished by its yellow (not red) flowers, and smooth bark even on old trees. It is more easily distinguished from Acer palmatum, as that species rarely has leaves with more than seven lobes.
