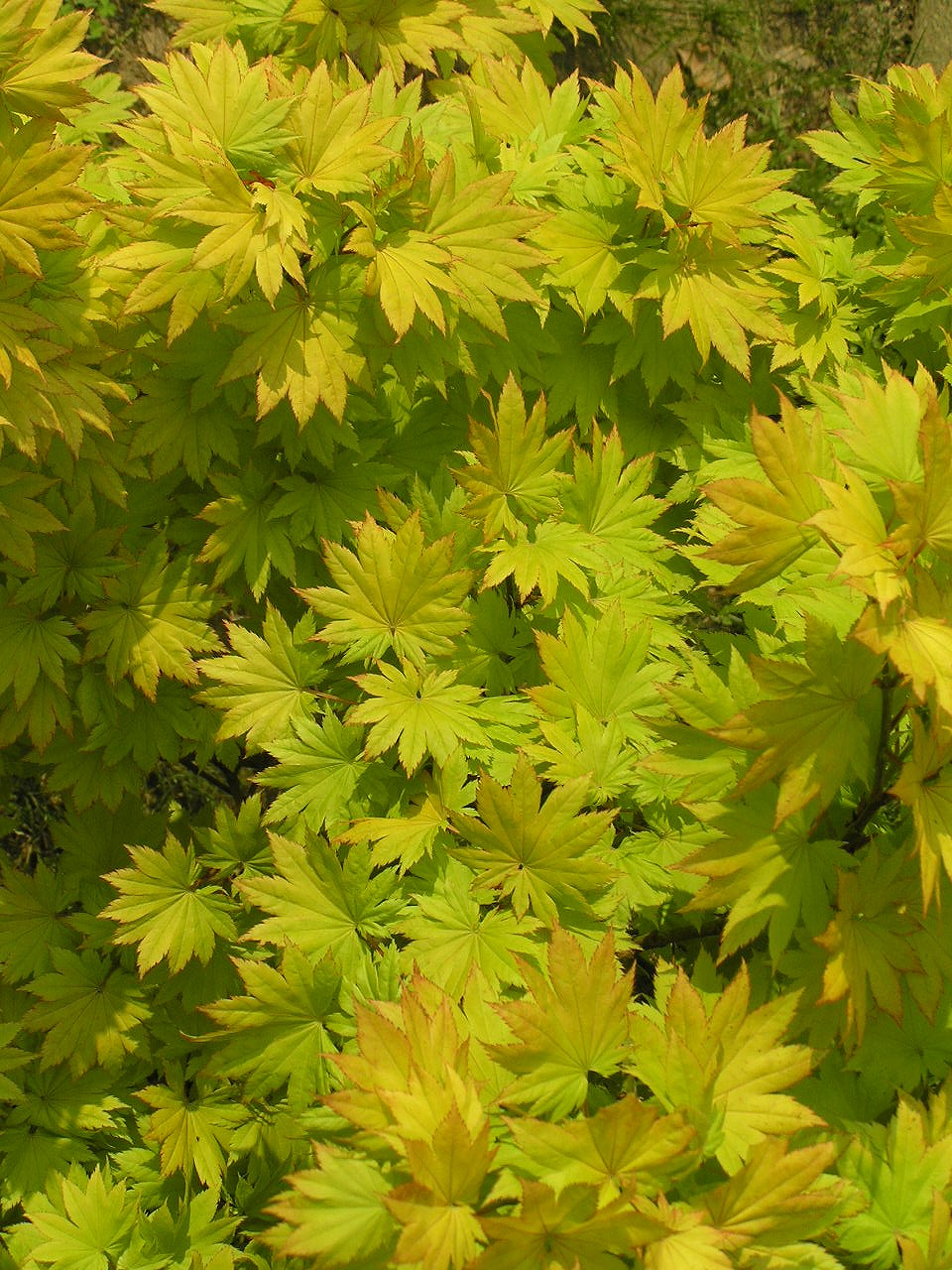

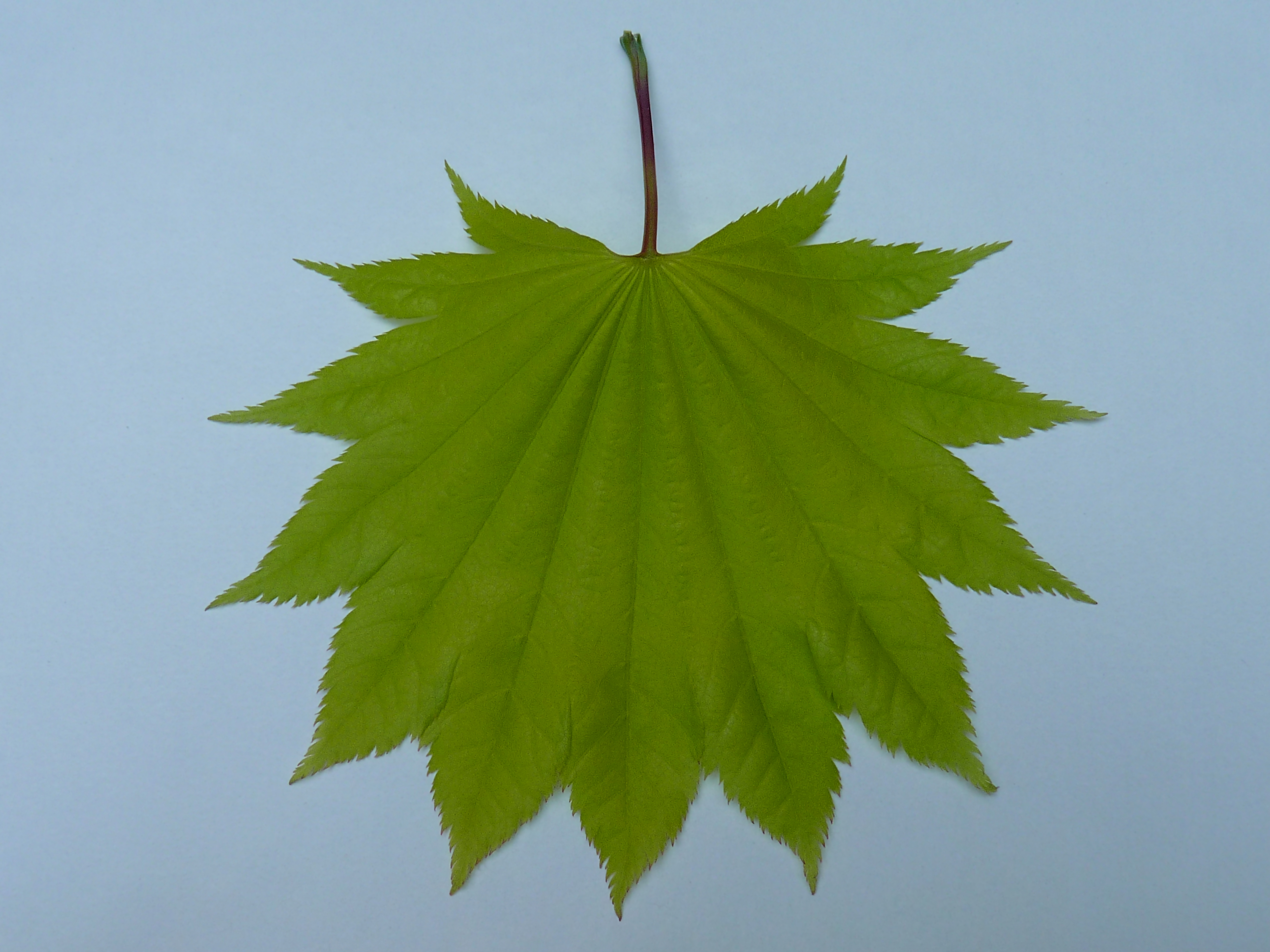

Scientific classification
- Kingdom: Plantae
- Clade: Tracheophytes
- Clade: Angiosperms
- Clade: Eudicots
- Clade: Rosids
- Order: Sapindales
- Family: Sapindaceae
- Genus: Acer
- Section: Acer sect. Palmata
- Series: Acer ser. Palmata
- Species: A. shirasawanum

Binomial name
- Acer shirasawanum Koidz. 1911

Synonyms
- List: Acer dissectum var. tenuifolium (Koidz.) Koidz.; Acer japonicum var. aureum Siesmayer; Acer japonicum f. aureum (Siesmayer) Schwer.; Acer japonicum var. microphyllum Siesmayer; Acer shirasawanum f. aureum (Siesmayer) Delendick; Acer shirasawanum var. tenuifolium Koidz.; Acer tenuifolium (Koidz.) Koidz.

= Acer shirasawanum =

Species of maple

Acer shirasawanum, the Shirasawa maple or fullmoon maple (Japanese: オオイタヤメイゲツ, romanized: ooitayameigetsu), is a species of maple native to Japan, on central and southern Honshū (Fukushima Prefecture southwards), Shikoku, and Kyūshū.

== Description ==
This species grows as a deciduous large shrub or small tree growing to 8–15 m tall with a trunk up to 50 cm diameter. The bark is smooth on both young and old trees. The shoots are slender, and hairless. The leaves are rounded, 4.5–8 cm long and 6–12 cm broad, palmately veined and lobed, with 9–13 (rarely 7) serrate shallowly incised lobes; they are hairless, or thinly hairy at first with white hairs; the petiole is 3–7 cm long and hairless. In autumn, the leaves turn bright gold or orange to dark red. The flowers are 1 cm diameter, with five dark purplish-red sepals, five small whitish petals (soon lost), and red stamens; they are andromonoecious, with inflorescences containing flowers with either both sexes, or just male, and are produced 10–20 together in erect terminal corymbs in early spring soon after the leaves appear. The fruit is a paired samara with the nutlets 5–10 mm diameter with a 20–25 mm wing, erect above the leaves, bright red maturing brown.

== Taxonomy ==
Acer shirasawanum is named after Japanese botanist Homi Shirasawa.

It can be distinguished from its close relatives Acer japonicum and Acer sieboldianum by its hairless shoots; from A. sieboldianum also by its red, not yellow, flowers.

Some authorities, especially in horticulture, still use the older classification including the species in A. japonicum; many specimens in cultivation also remain mislabelled as A. japonicum.

Two subspecies are accepted:

- Acer shirasawanum subsp. shirasawanum
- Acer shirasawanum subsp. tenuifolium

== Cultivation and uses ==
It is grown as an ornamental tree in gardens for its foliage and autumn colour, but is seen far less commonly than Acer palmatum (Japanese maple). A number of cultivars have been selected; the lighter-coloured A. shirasawanum cultivar 'Aureum' is very widely grown, much more common in cultivation than the main species, and has gained the Royal Horticultural Society's Award of Garden Merit.

It is propagated by grafting onto more hardy and fast-growing Acer species, in particular A. palmatum and A. japonicum.

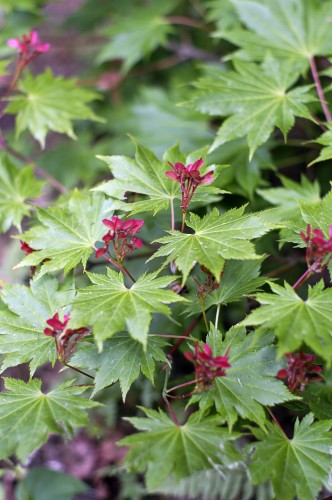
Leaves and immature fruit

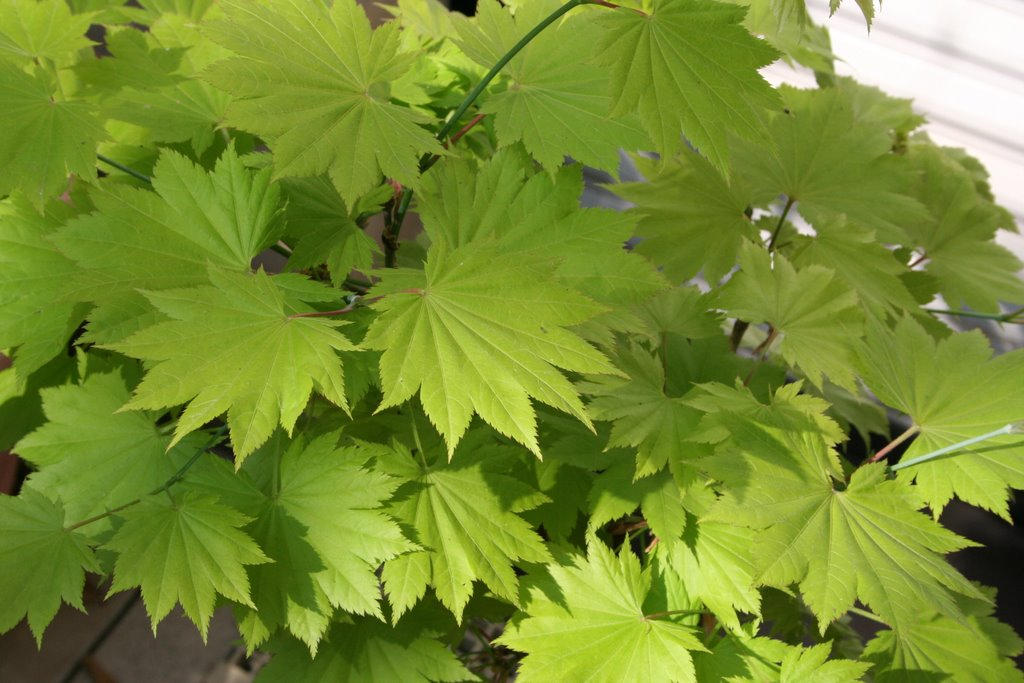
Cultivar 'Aureum', foliage

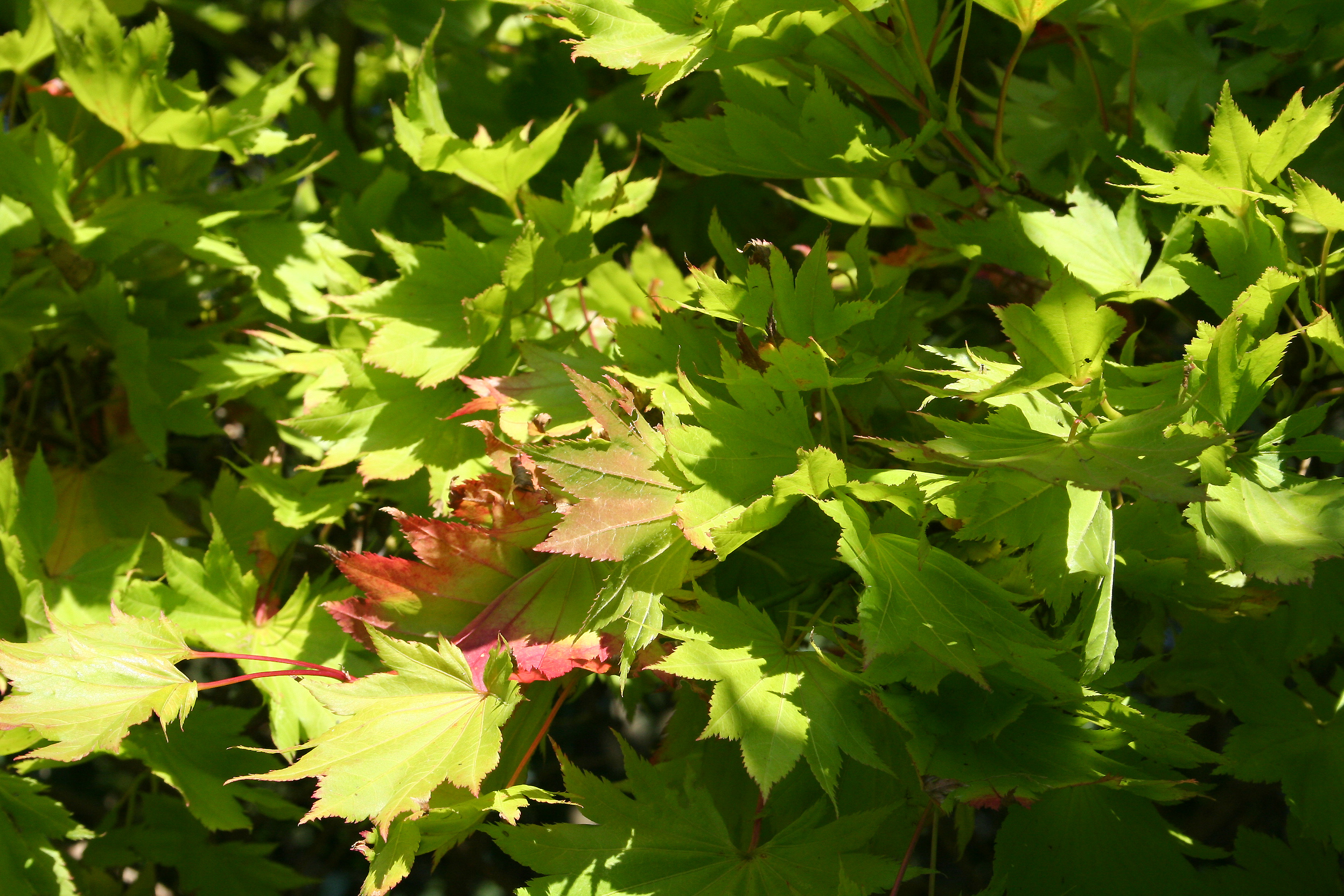
Cultivar 'Aureum', foliage in autumn

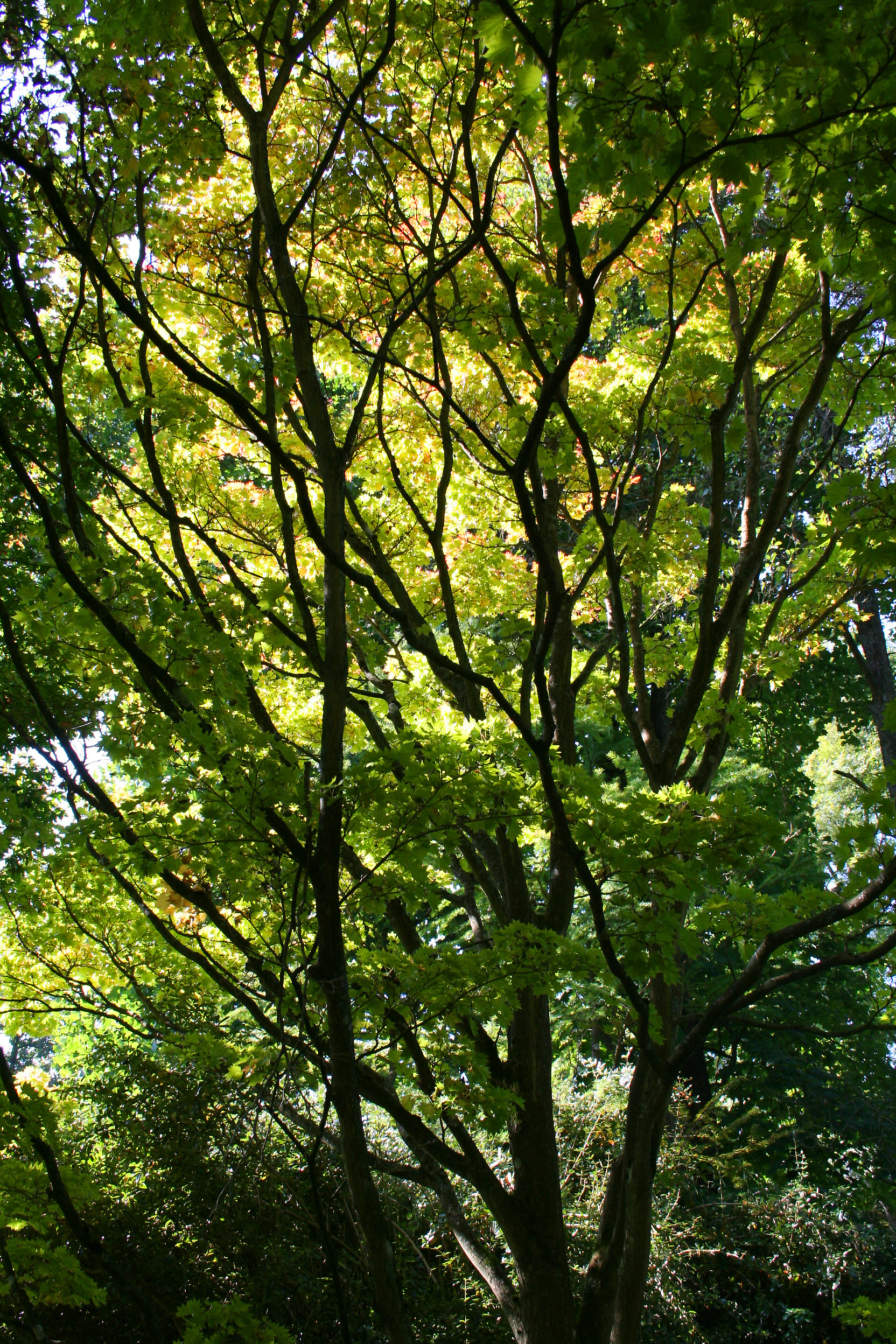
Cultivar 'Aureum', in Arboretum Robert Lenoir Rendeux (Belgium)

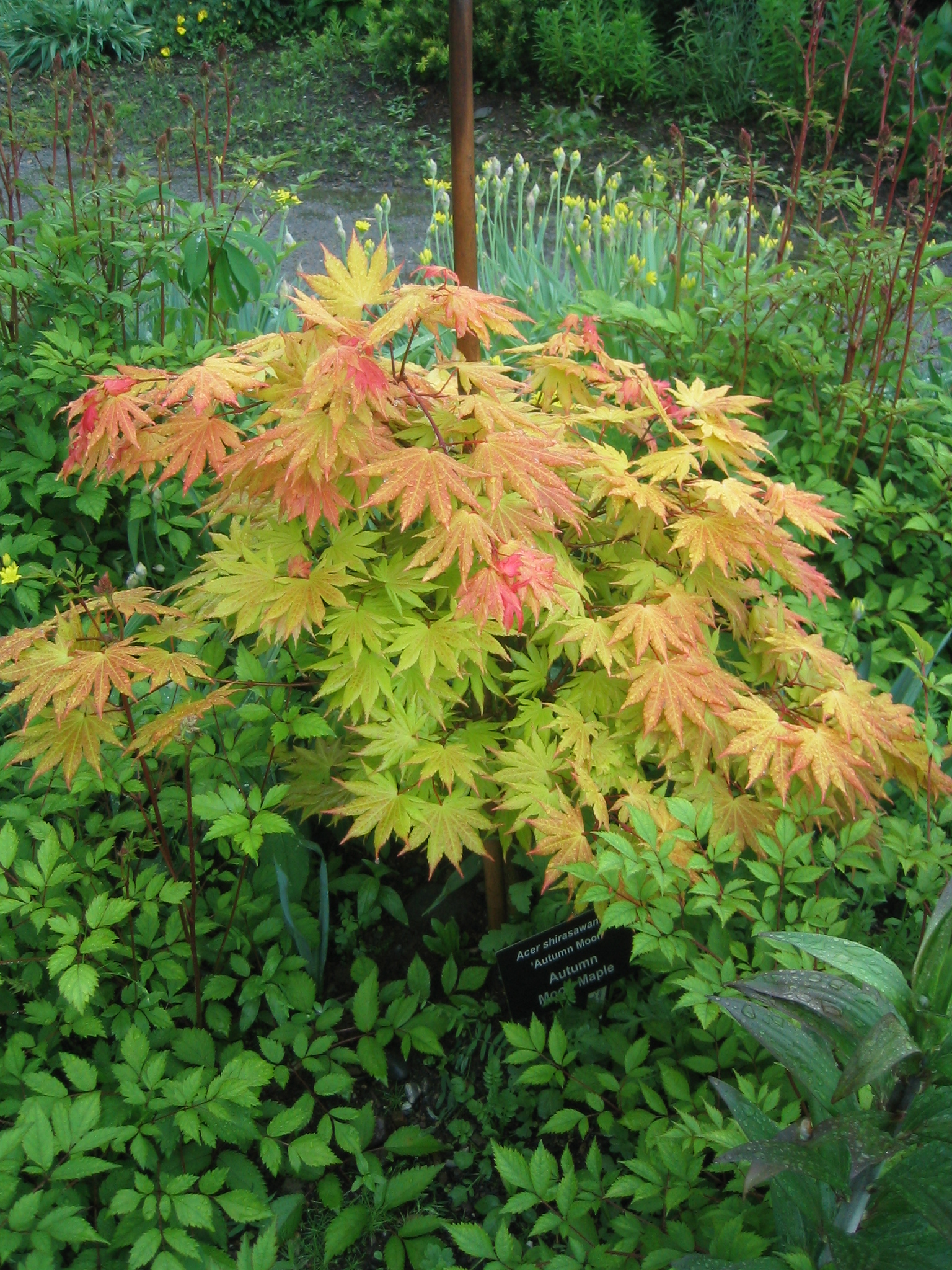
Cultivar 'Autumn Moon', in Kingsbrae Garden (St. Andrews, New Brunswick, Canada)

== Related links ==
Media related to Acer shirasawanum at Wikimedia Commons
