= Hog plum =

Hog plum is a common name for several plants that produce edible fruit, and may refer to:

- Species of the genus Spondias
  - Spondias dulcis (June plum, golden apple, pommecythere, cythere)
  - Spondias mombin (yellow mombin, amra, cajazeira)
  - Spondias pinnata
- Species of the genus Colubrina
- Prunus rivularis (creek plum, wild-goose plum)
- Prunus umbellata (flatwoods plum, sloe plum)
- Ximenia americana (tallow wood, yellow plum, sea lemon)
- Elaeocarpus hygrophilus (makok nam, water olive)
