= Prunus × palmeri =

Scientific classification
- Kingdom: Plantae
- Clade: Tracheophytes
- Clade: Angiosperms
- Clade: Eudicots
- Clade: Rosids
- Order: Rosales
- Family: Rosaceae
- Genus: Prunus
- Subgenus: Prunus subg. Prunus
- Section: Prunus sect. Prunocerasus
- Species: P. × palmeri

Binomial name
- Prunus × palmeri Sarg.

Hybrid species of tree

Prunus × palmeri is a nothospecies of plum tree. It is a hybrid of Prunus hortulana and Prunus mexicana and it typically grows up to about 30 feet tall.
