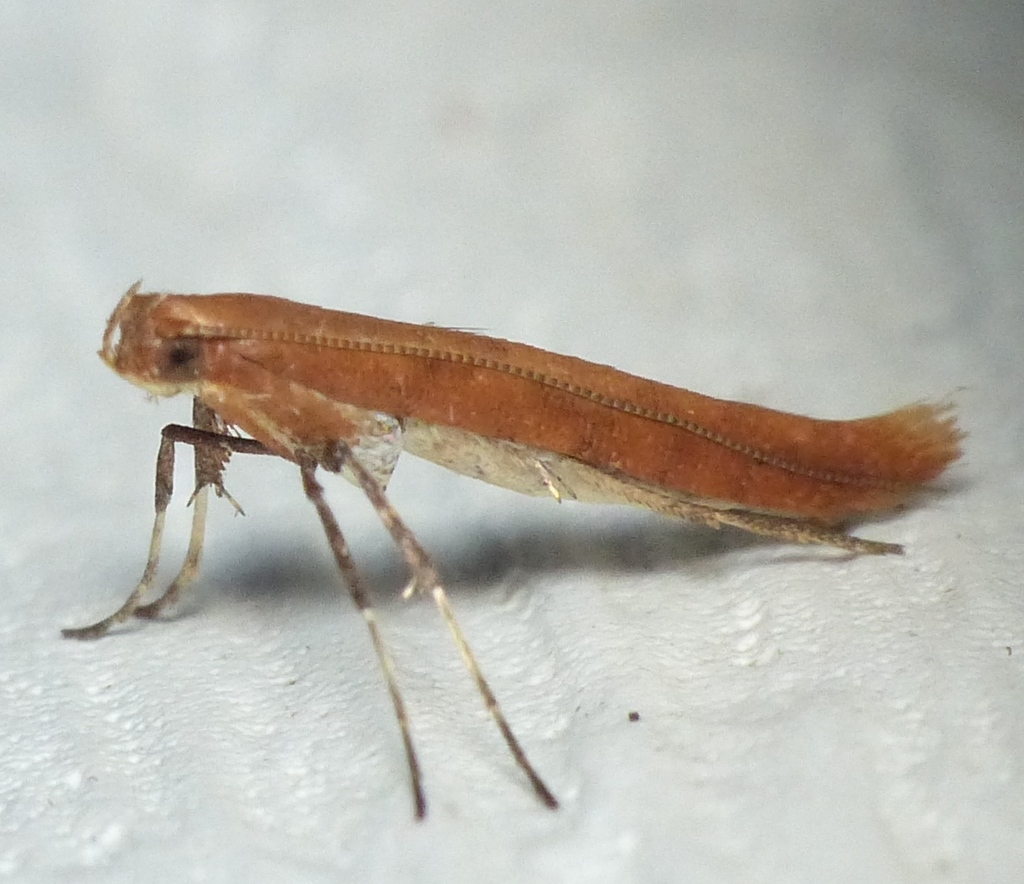

Scientific classification
- Kingdom: Animalia
- Phylum: Arthropoda
- Clade: Pancrustacea
- Class: Insecta
- Order: Lepidoptera
- Family: Gracillariidae
- Genus: Caloptilia
- Species: C. invariabilis

Binomial name
- Caloptilia invariabilis (Braun, 1927)

= Caloptilia invariabilis =

Cherry leaf-cone caterpillar moth

Species of moth

Caloptilia invariabilis (cherry leaf-cone caterpillar moth) is a moth of the family Gracillariidae. It is known from Canada (Nova Scotia, Ontario and Québec) and the United States (California, Vermont and Tennessee).

The wingspan is about 15 mm.

The larvae feed on Prunus angustifolia, Prunus pennsylvanica, Prunus serotina and Prunus virginiana. They mine the leaves of their host plant. The mine has the form of a very indistinct whitish linear mine ending in a small underside blotch. The parenchyma is consumed and the epidermis somewhat wrinkled. When the mine is at the margin of the leaf, the edge is folded under.
