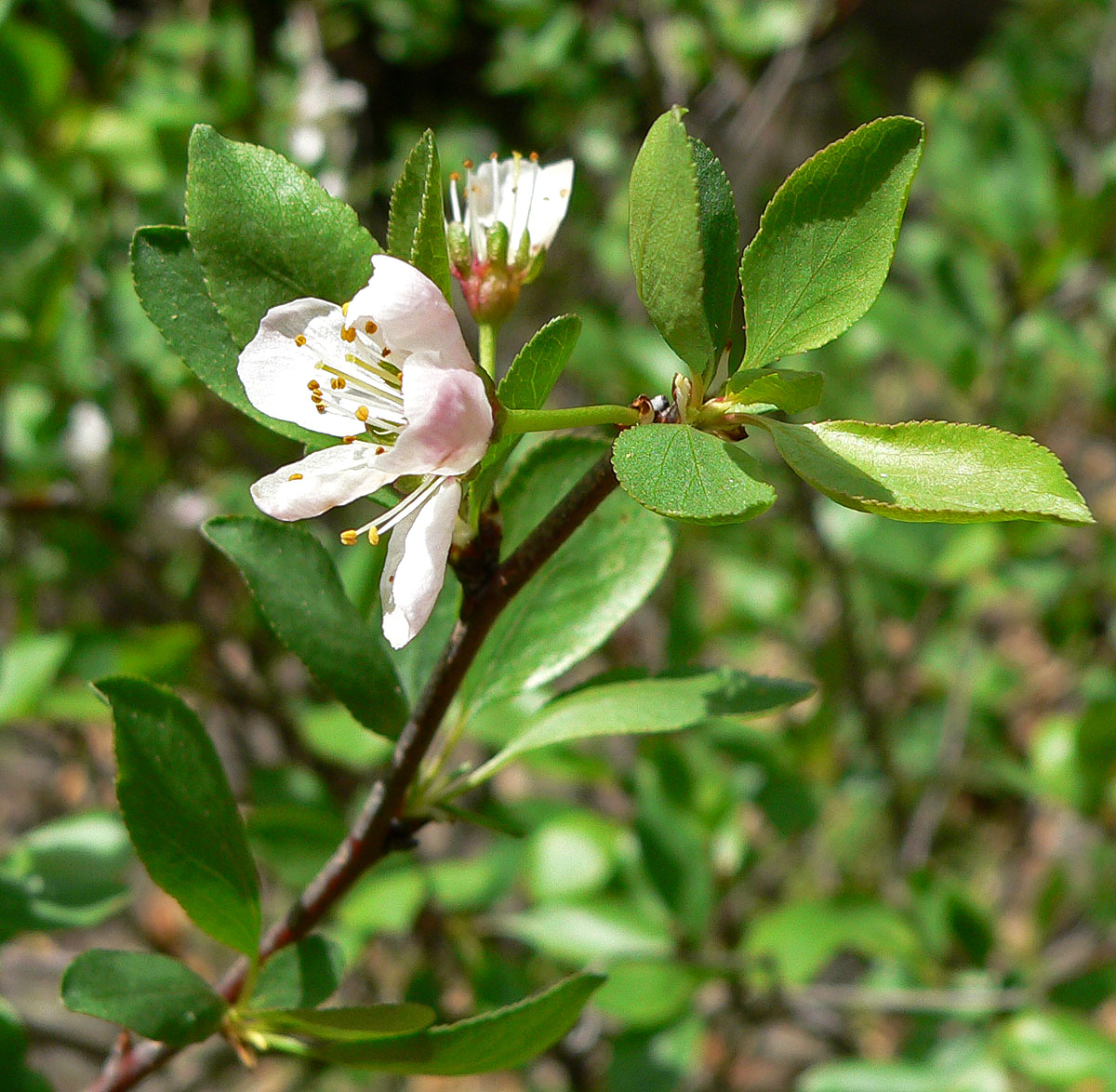
- Leaves and flowers (detail)

Conservation status
- Least Concern (IUCN 3.1)

Scientific classification
- Kingdom: Plantae
- Clade: Tracheophytes
- Clade: Angiosperms
- Clade: Eudicots
- Clade: Rosids
- Order: Rosales
- Family: Rosaceae
- Genus: Prunus
- Subgenus: Prunus subg. Prunus
- Section: Prunus sect. Prunocerasus
- Species: P. subcordata

Binomial name
- Prunus subcordata Benth.
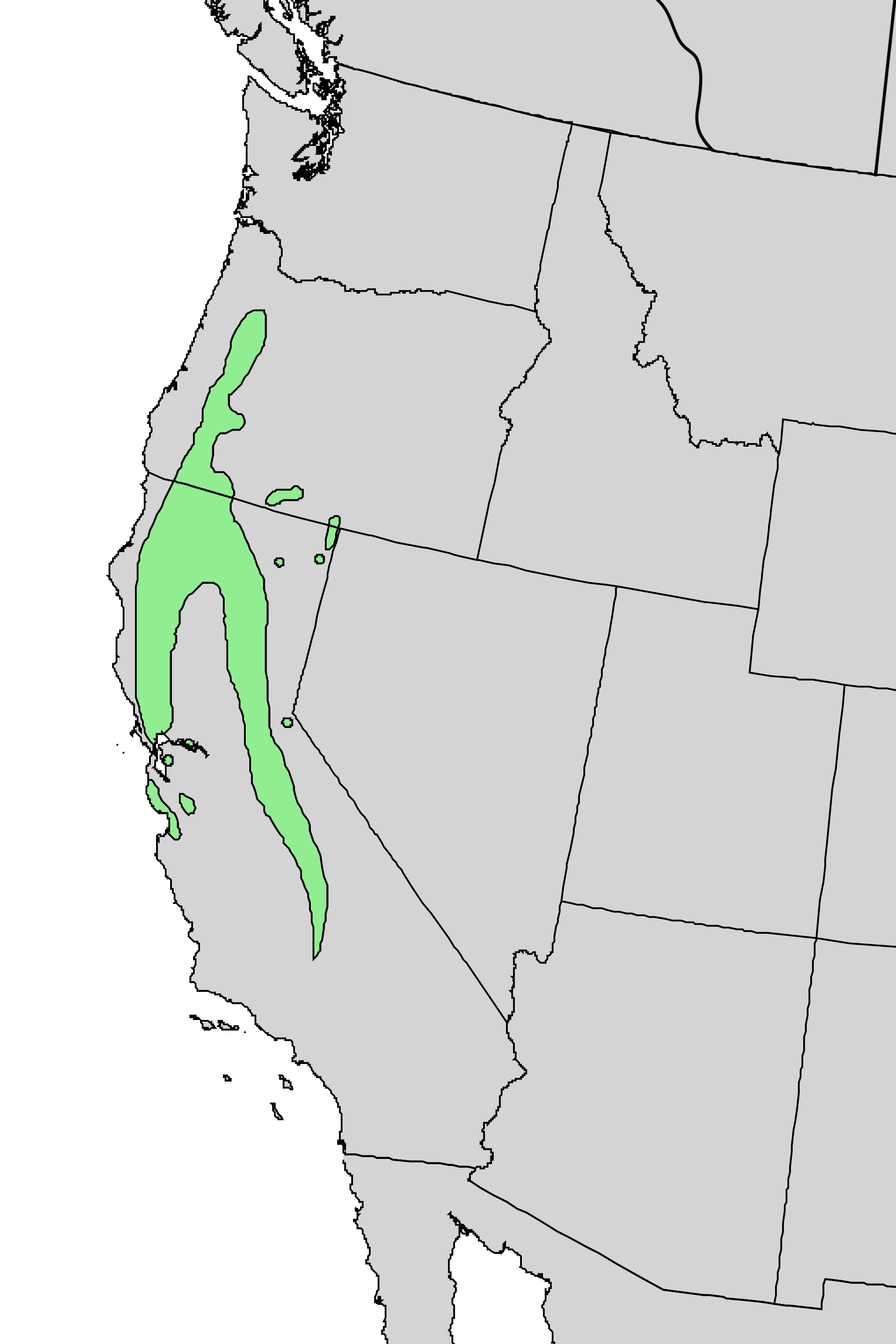
- Natural range of Prunus subcordata in 1976

Synonyms
- Prunus subcordata var. kelloggii Lemmon; Prunus oregana Greene; Prunus subcordata var. oregana (Greene) M. Peck; Prunus subcordata var. rubicunda Jeps.; Prunus subcordata var. subcordata Benth.

= Prunus subcordata =

Species of tree

Prunus subcordata, known by the common names Klamath plum, Oregon plum, Pacific plum and Sierra plum, is a member of the genus Prunus, native to the western United States, especially California and Oregon.

== Description ==
Prunus subcordata is an erect deciduous shrub or small tree growing to 8 meters (26 feet) in height with a trunk diameter of up to 15 centimeters (6 inches). It sprouts from its roots and can form dense, spiny thickets. The bark is gray with horizontal brown lenticels, similar in appearance to that of the cultivated cherry tree. The leaves are 2.5–6 cm (1–2 1/2 in) long with a 4–15 millimeters (1/8–5/8 in) petiole, dark green, turning red before falling, and faintly toothed.

The flowers are white or pinkish, 2 cm across, appearing in the spring in clusters of one to seven together. The fruit is a small, plum-like drupe, variable in appearance, 15–25 mm (5/8–1 in) in length, and may be red or yellow; they mature in late summer. The plums are small and tart.

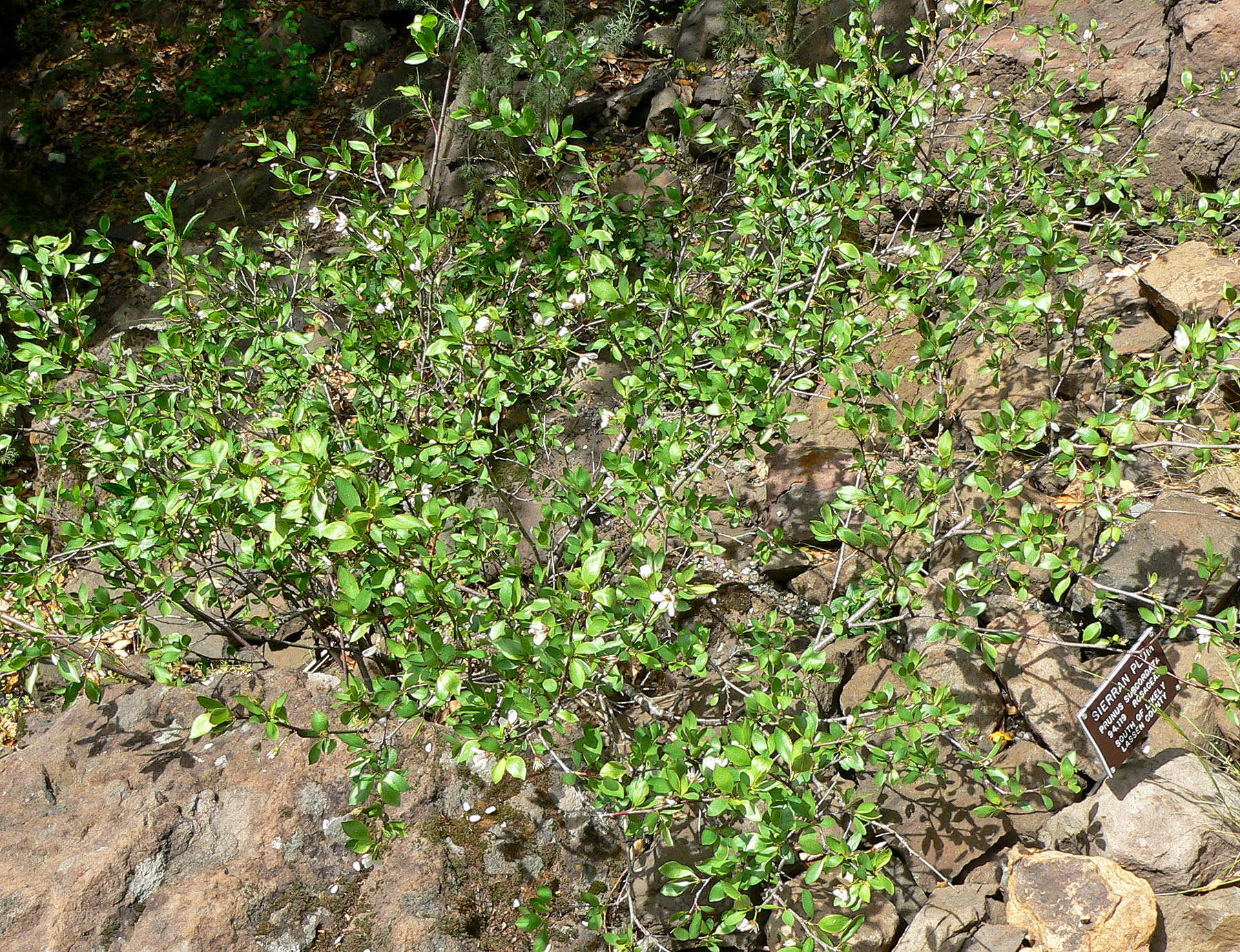
Thicket

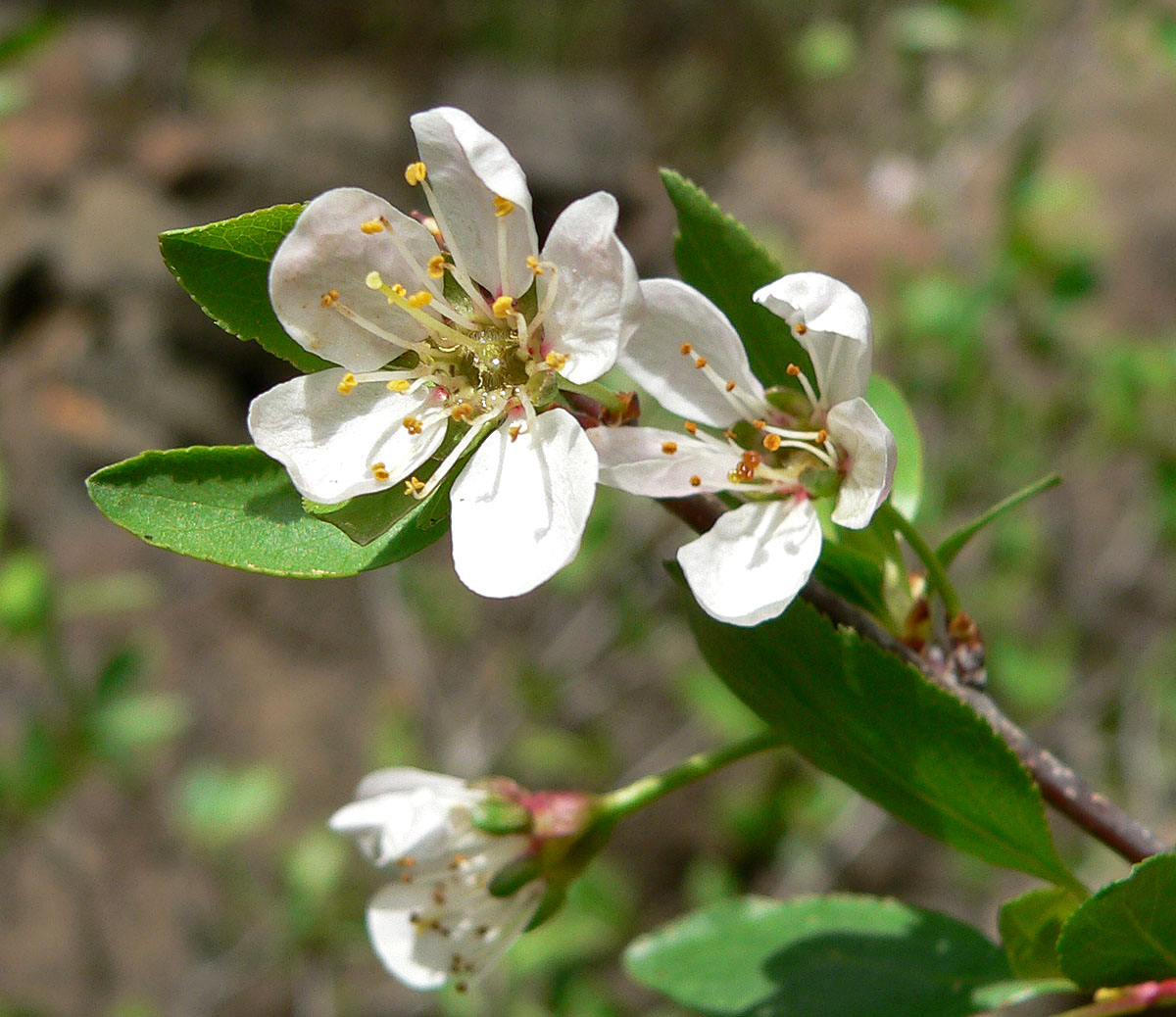
Leaves and flowers

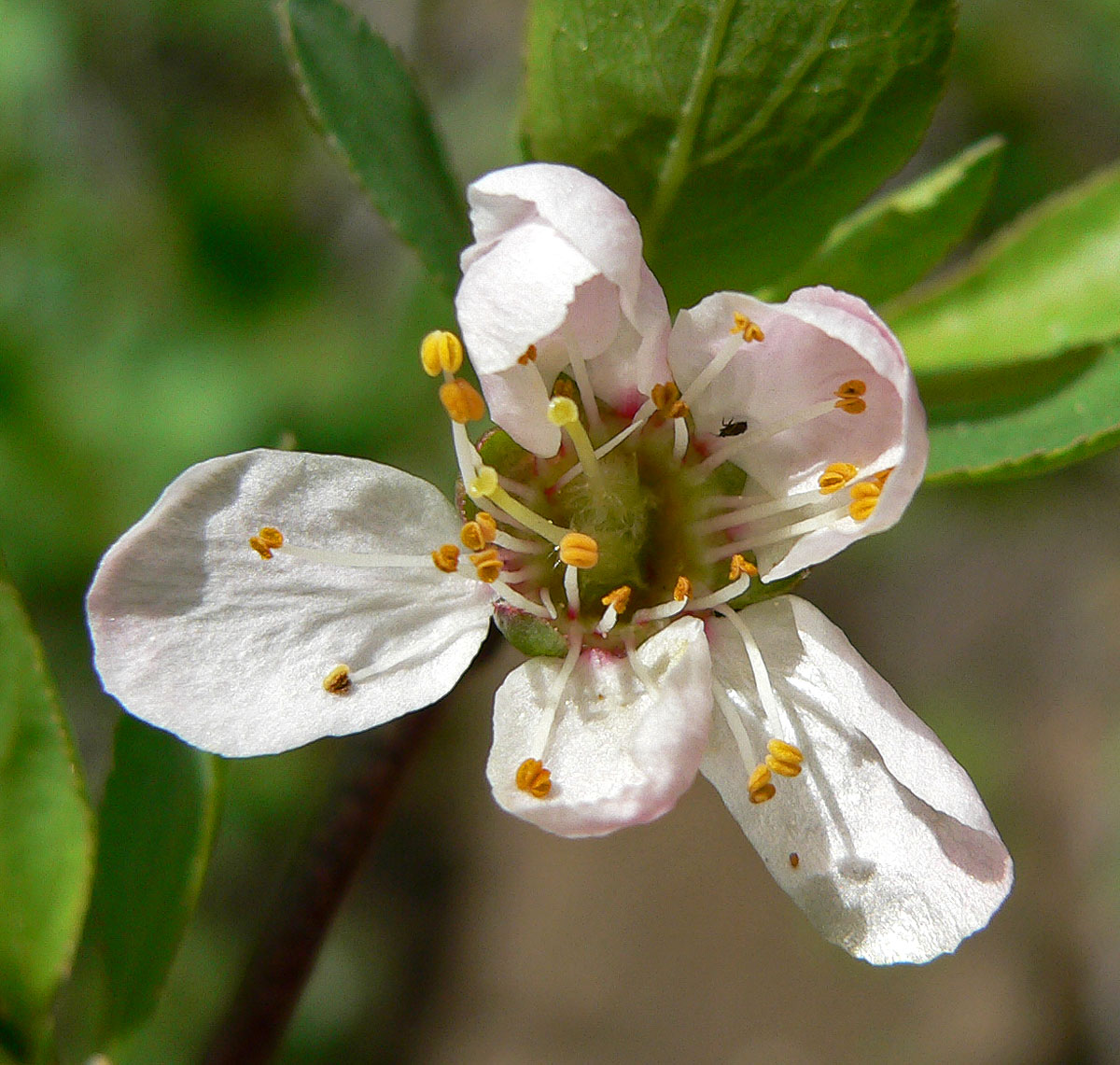
Pink-dotted flower

=== Varieties ===
P. subcordata var. kelloggii is less hairy and had larger, yellow fruits. P. subcordata var. rubicunda is a shrub with red fruits, which are relatively bitter.

In addition to California and Oregon, P. subcordata var. subcordata, known as Klamath plum, is also found in Washington.

=== Similar species ===
Prunus americana (American or wild plum) is found in the eastern United States.

== Taxonomy ==
The three main common names are related to the plum's mountain ranges and locales.

== Distribution and habitat ==
The species is native to Northern California and from central to western and southern Oregon. It grows in forests, most often at low elevations near the coast, but is also found in the Sierra Nevada and Cascades. It grows at altitudes of 100–1,900 m (330–6,230 ft).

The range of P. subcordata surrounds the San Joaquin Valley, especially the western flank foothills of the Sierra Nevada range, but avoids the coast mountains of the southwest San Joaquin Valley. For other Pacific coastal Prunus species, P. emarginata is also found in the Pacific Northwest states; P. fremontii and P. ilicifolia are found in coastal or mountain areas of southwest California and northern Baja California.

== Ecology ==
Various animals eat the fruit and thus spread the seeds.

== Uses ==
The berry is considered edible.

== In culture ==
The Concow tribe call the tree gos’-i (Konkow language).

== See also ==
- Klamath Mountains
