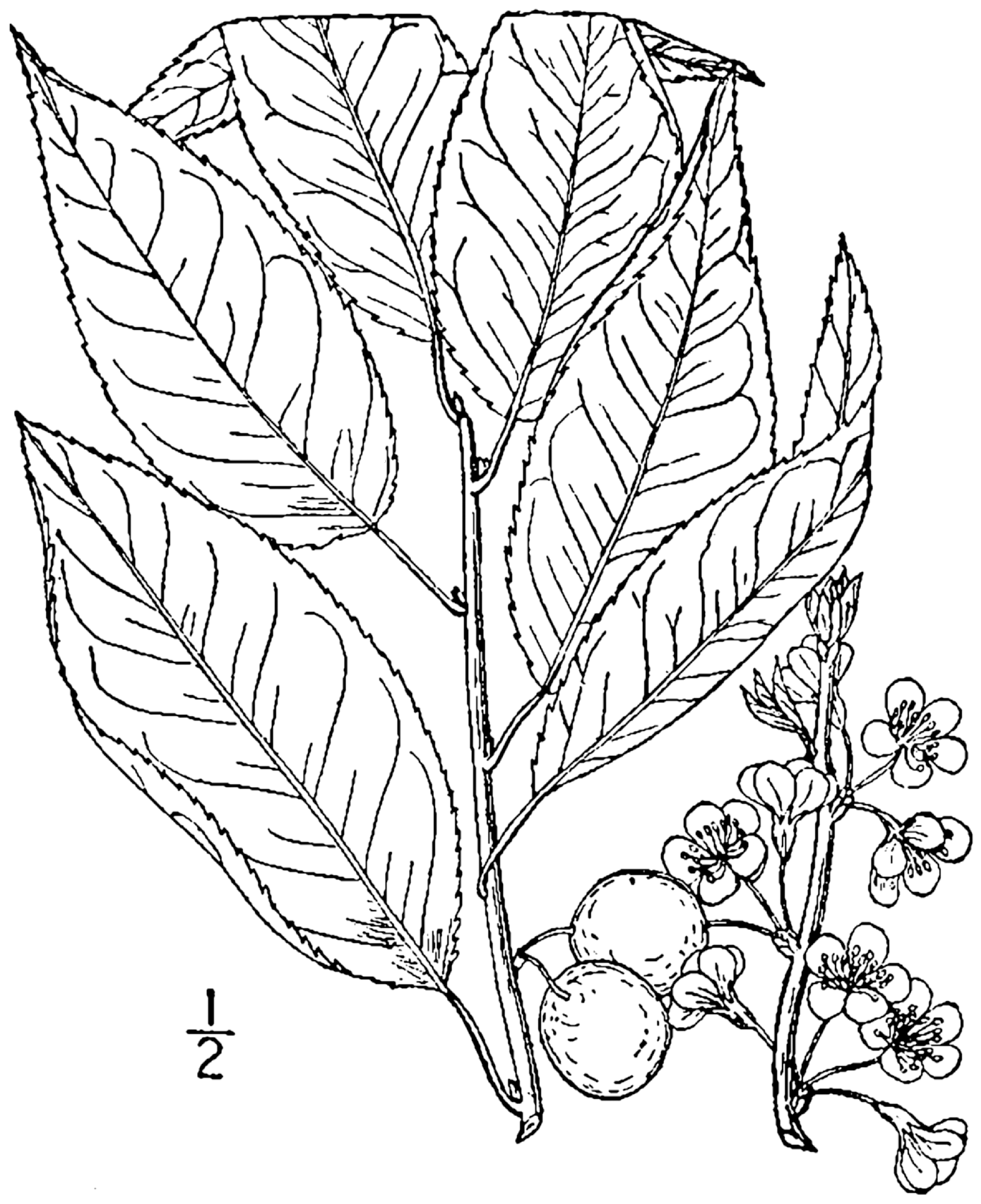
- 1913 illustration

Conservation status
- Apparently Secure (NatureServe)

Scientific classification
- Kingdom: Plantae
- Clade: Tracheophytes
- Clade: Angiosperms
- Clade: Eudicots
- Clade: Rosids
- Order: Rosales
- Family: Rosaceae
- Genus: Prunus
- Subgenus: Prunus subg. Prunus
- Section: Prunus sect. Prunocerasus
- Species: P. alleghaniensis

Binomial name
- Prunus alleghaniensis Porter

= Prunus alleghaniensis =

Species of tree

Prunus alleghaniensis, the Allegheny plum, is a species of plum native to eastern North America.

== Description ==
Prunus alleghaniensis is a shrub or small tree reaching heights of 0.9–3.6 meters (3–12 feet) or more. The twigs sometimes have thorns and the bark is fissured in older specimens. The leaves are 5 to 9 centimeters (2 to 3 1/2 inches) long, with finely toothed margins and often a long and pointed tip.

The flowers are plentiful and white, eventually turning pink. The dark purple fruit is up to about 13 millimeters (1/2 in) wide, covered by a whitish bloom.

=== Similar species ===
Prunus maritima on the east coast is similar but lacks pointed leaves and has larger fruit.

== Taxonomy ==
Thomas Conrad Porter described the species in 1877. The specific epithet refers to the Allegheny Mountains, a subrange of the Appalacians where it was found.

== Distribution and habitat ==
The species is native to the Appalachian Mountains from New York to Kentucky and North Carolina, plus the Lower Peninsula of Michigan. There are old reports of it growing also in New Jersey and Connecticut, but it now appears to have been extirpated in those two states. It is typically found in elevations between 370 and 610 m (1,200 and 2,000 ft) and is uncommon in moist woodland.

== Uses ==
The fruit is made into pies, preserves and jelly.
