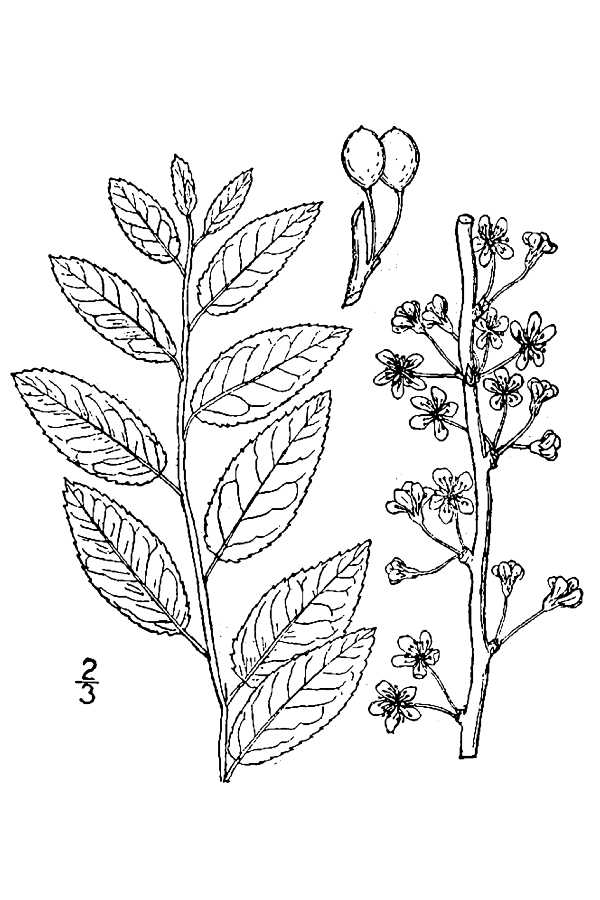
- 1913 illustration

Conservation status
- Least Concern (IUCN 3.1)

Scientific classification
- Kingdom: Plantae
- Clade: Embryophytes
- Clade: Tracheophytes
- Clade: Angiosperms
- Clade: Eudicots
- Clade: Rosids
- Order: Rosales
- Family: Rosaceae
- Genus: Prunus
- Subgenus: Prunus subg. Prunus
- Section: Prunus sect. Prunocerasus
- Species: P. gracilis

Binomial name
- Prunus gracilis Engelm. & A.Gray

Synonyms
- Prunus normalis Small

= Prunus gracilis =

Species of tree

Prunus gracilis, called the Oklahoma plum, sour plum, and sand plum, is a species of Prunus native to the south-central United States.

== Description ==
Prunus gracilis grows up to 1.8 metres (6 feet) tall and has five-petaled leaves. Its fruits ripen from June to August. It is hermaphroditic and pollinated by insects.

== Taxonomy ==
The specific epithet gracilis refers to 'slender branches'.

== Distribution and habitat ==
The species is natively found in various states of the United States, including Alabama, southwestern Arkansas, southeastern Colorado, Kansas, northwestern Louisiana, eastern New Mexico, Oklahoma, and Texas.

It forms clusters and thickets in fence rows, open woodlands, woodlands edge, forest openings, hillsides, slopes, sandy roadsides, and waste places. It is normally found at 100–1,300 m (330–4,270 ft) above sea level.

== Uses ==
Its red fruits are considered poor for eating, but Native Americans dried them for consumption during winter.
