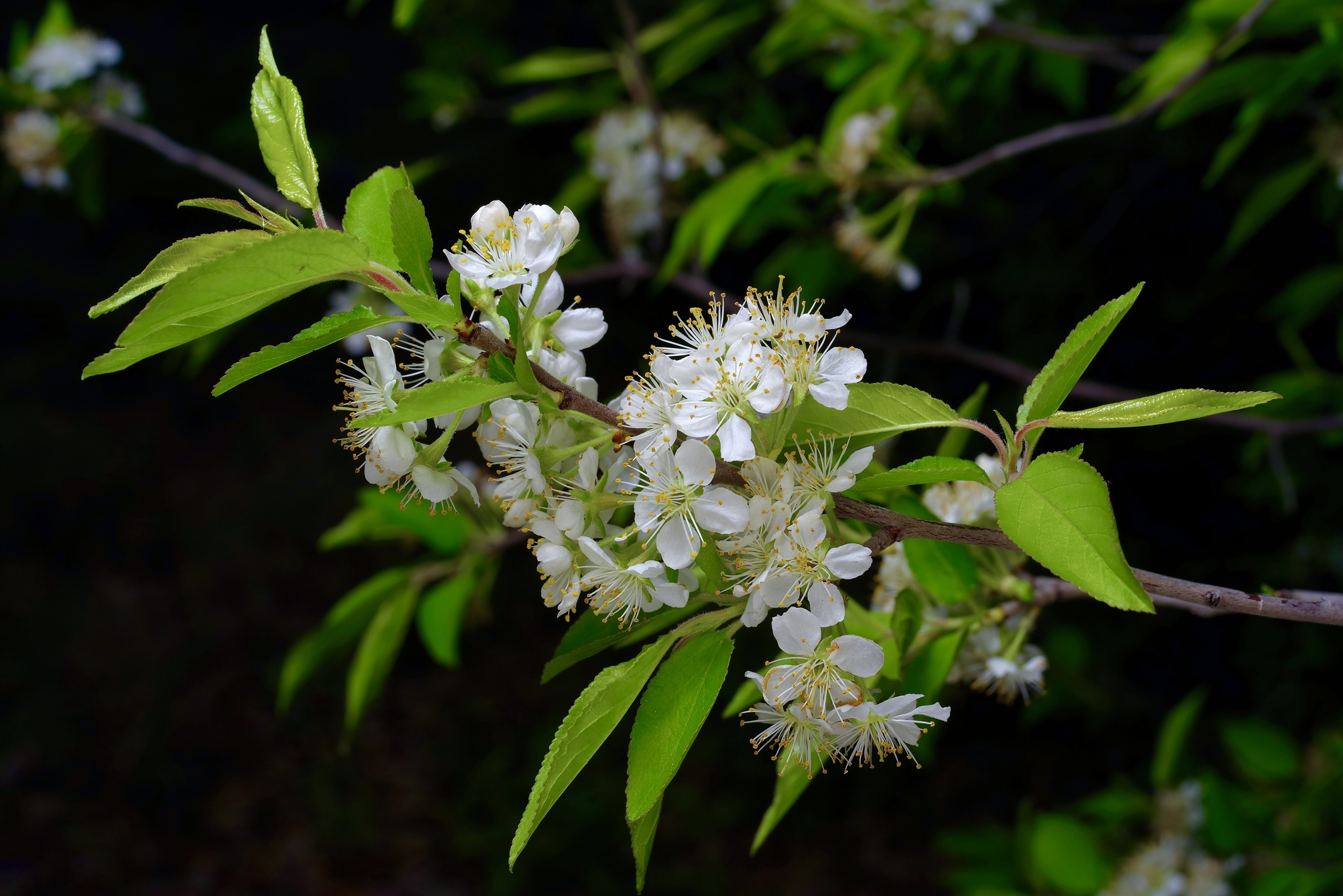

Conservation status
- Critically Endangered (IUCN 3.1)

Scientific classification
- Kingdom: Plantae
- Clade: Tracheophytes
- Clade: Angiosperms
- Clade: Eudicots
- Clade: Rosids
- Order: Rosales
- Family: Rosaceae
- Genus: Prunus
- Subgenus: Prunus subg. Prunus
- Section: Prunus sect. Prunocerasus
- Species: P. murrayana

Binomial name
- Prunus murrayana E.J.Palmer

Synonyms
- Prunus rivularis var. pubescens Enquist

= Prunus murrayana =

Species of tree

Prunus murrayana, called the Murray's plum, is a critically endangered shrub native to Texas. It is found in the Edwards Plateau and the trans-Pecos regions of the state.

Prunus murrayana is a thorny, deciduous shrub up to 5 metres (16 1/2 ft) tall, forming clumps by means of sprouts formed at the base of the plant. The leaves are hairy on both surfaces, usually folding along the midrib. The flowers are white, usually appearing about the same time as the leaves. The fruits are red with white dots, hairless but with a waxy coating on the outside. It is purportedly so rare that no one has seen its fruit since first being scientifically described.

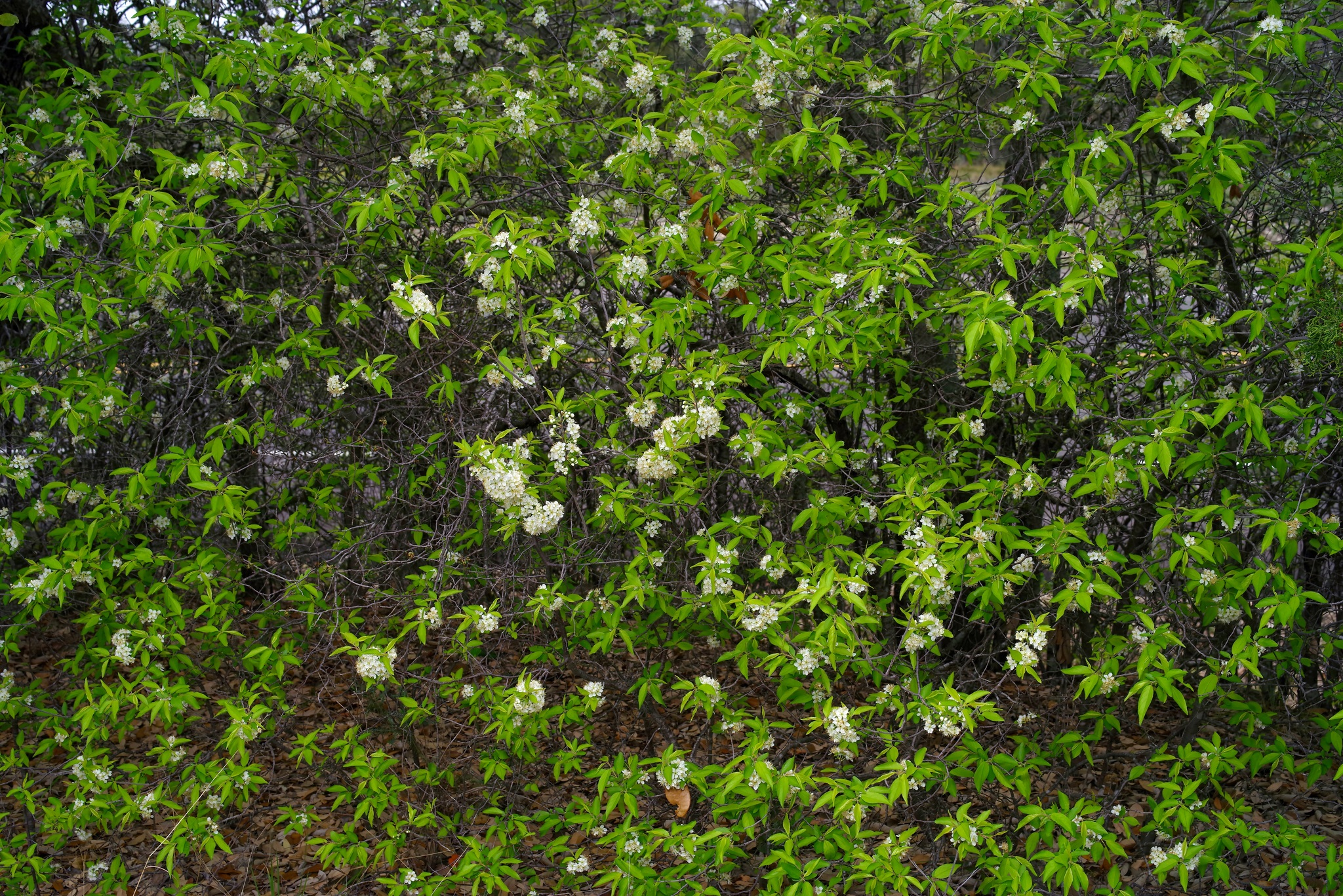
Shrub

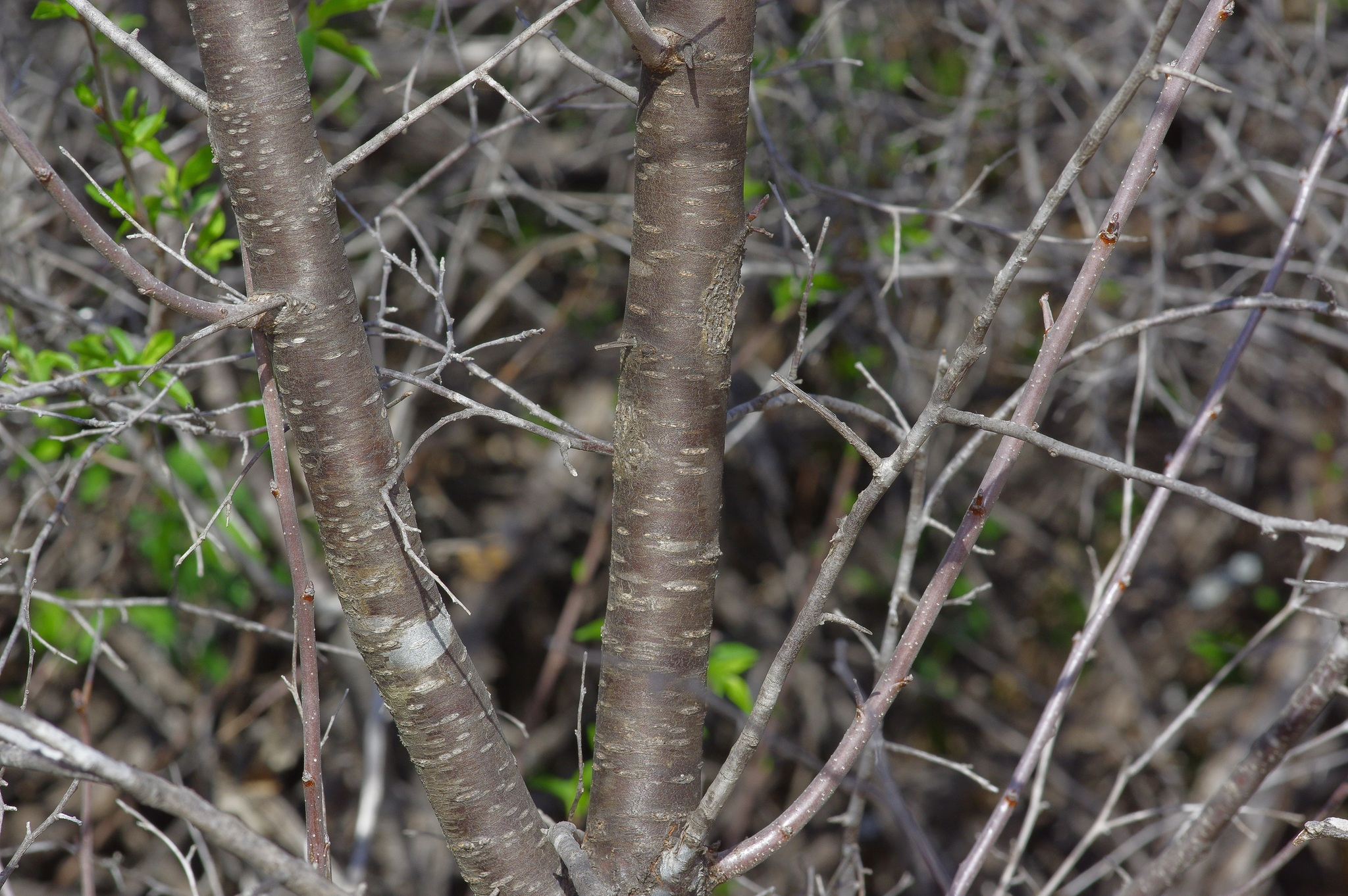
Bark

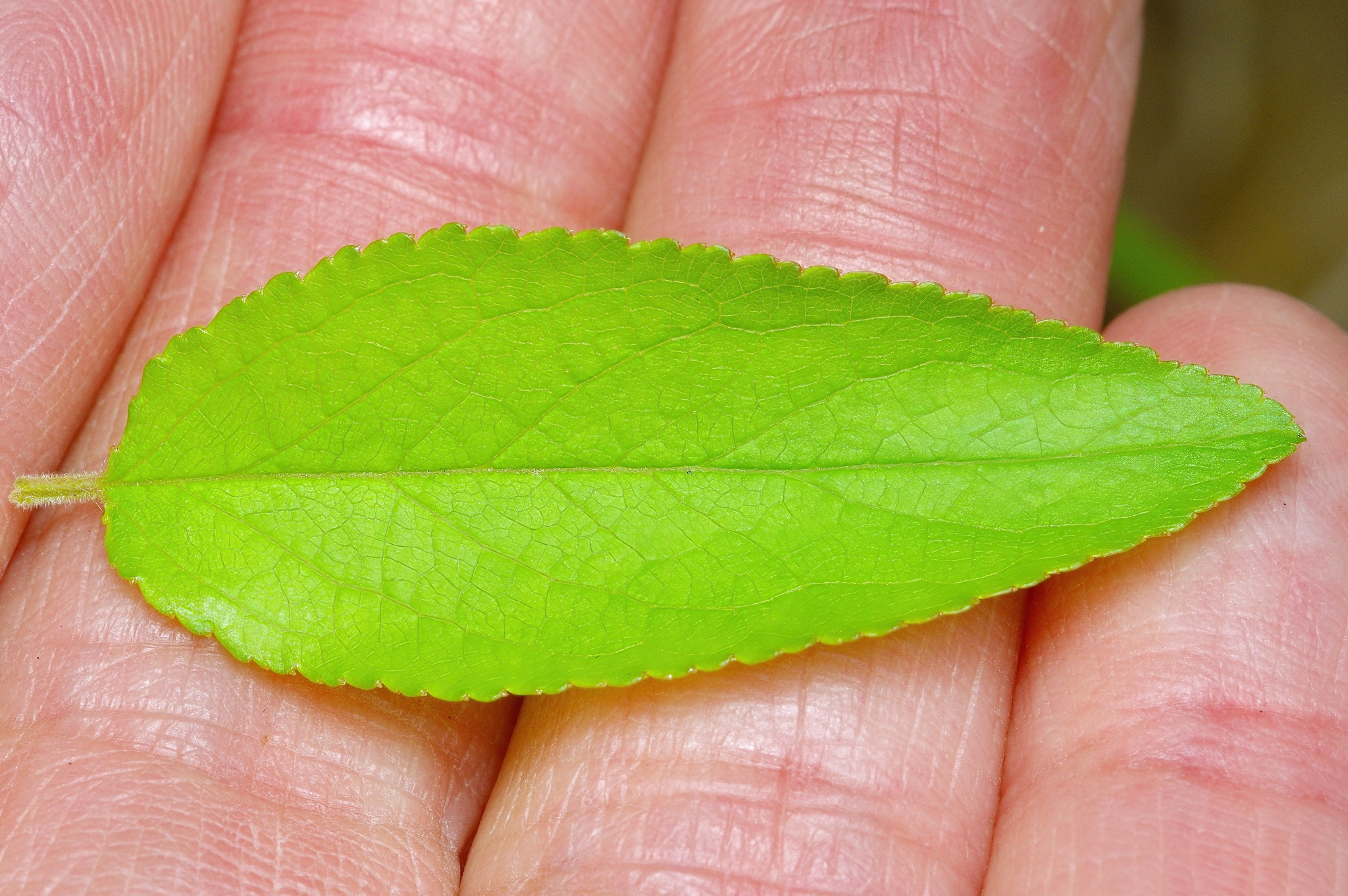
Adaxial leaf surface

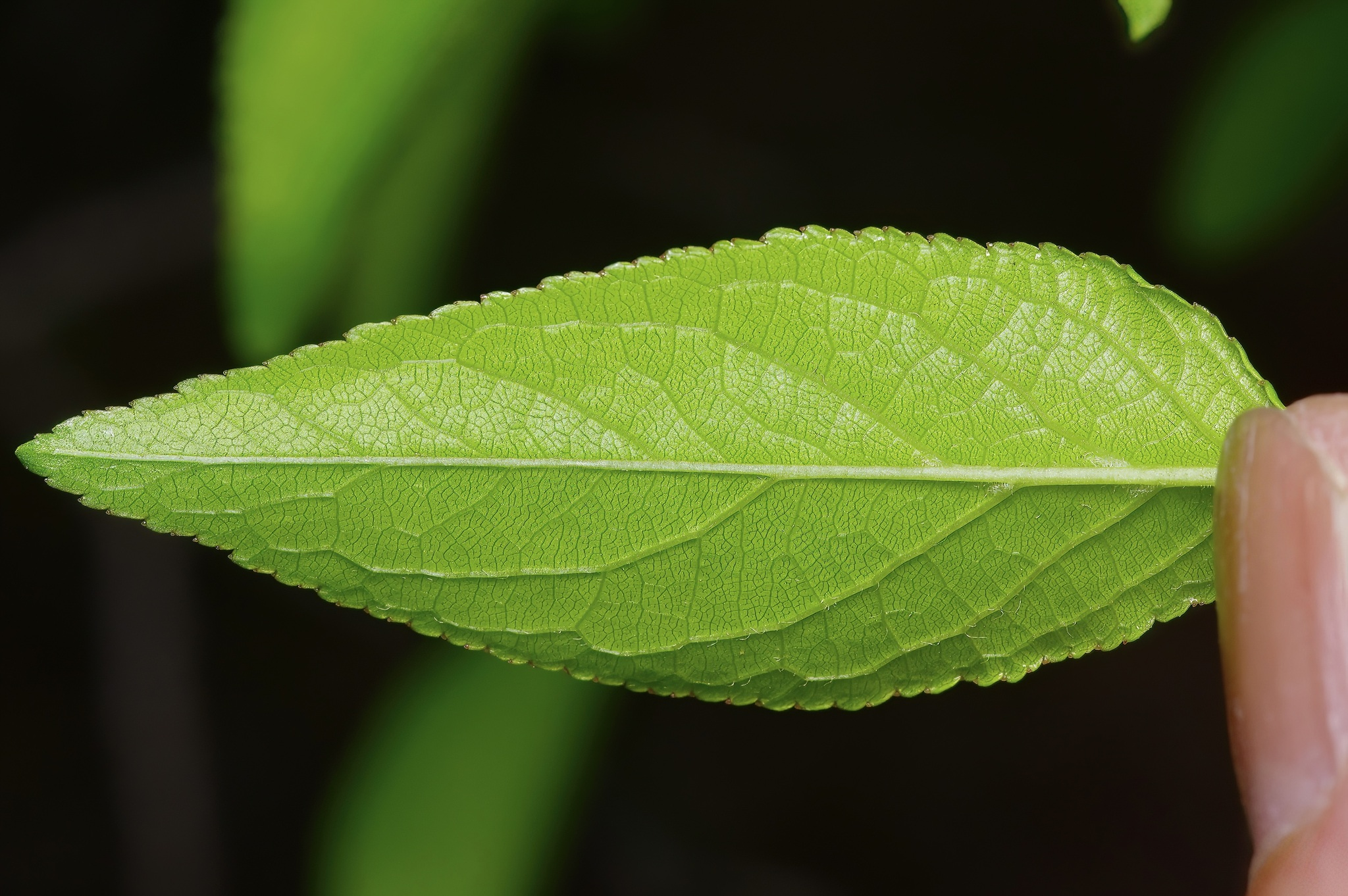
Abaxial leaf surface

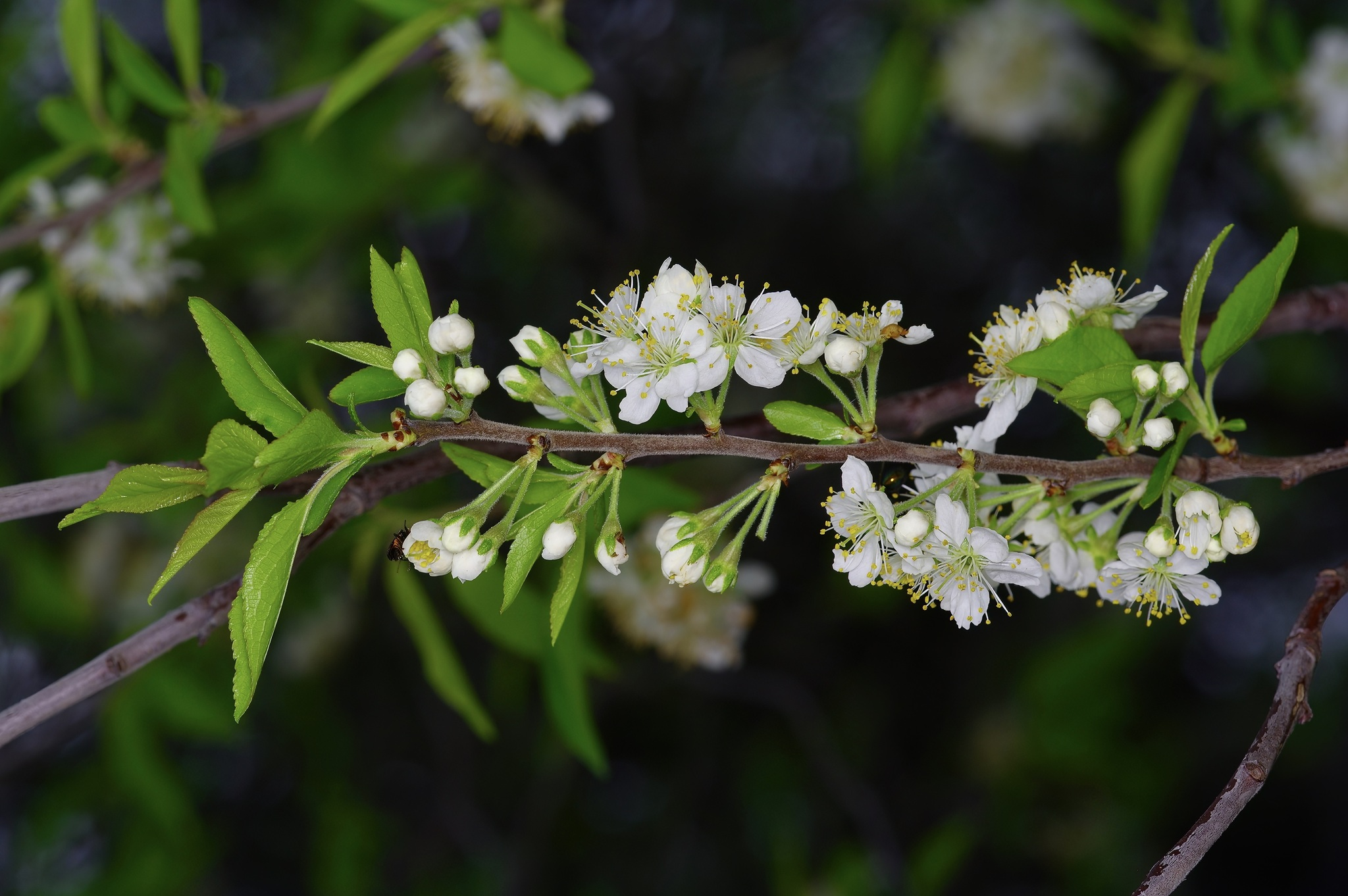
Inflorescences: up to 4-flowered

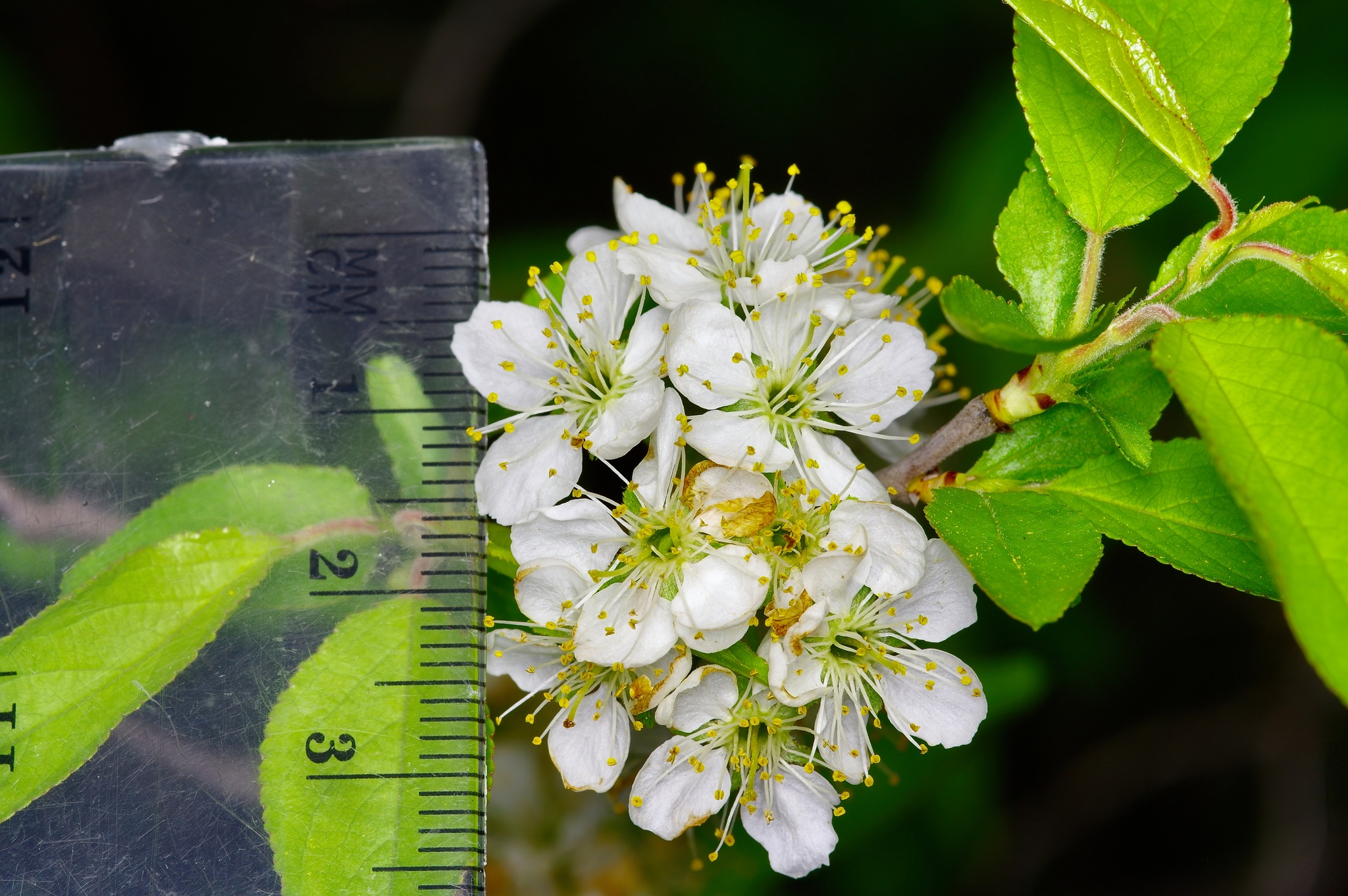
Flowers with mm scale

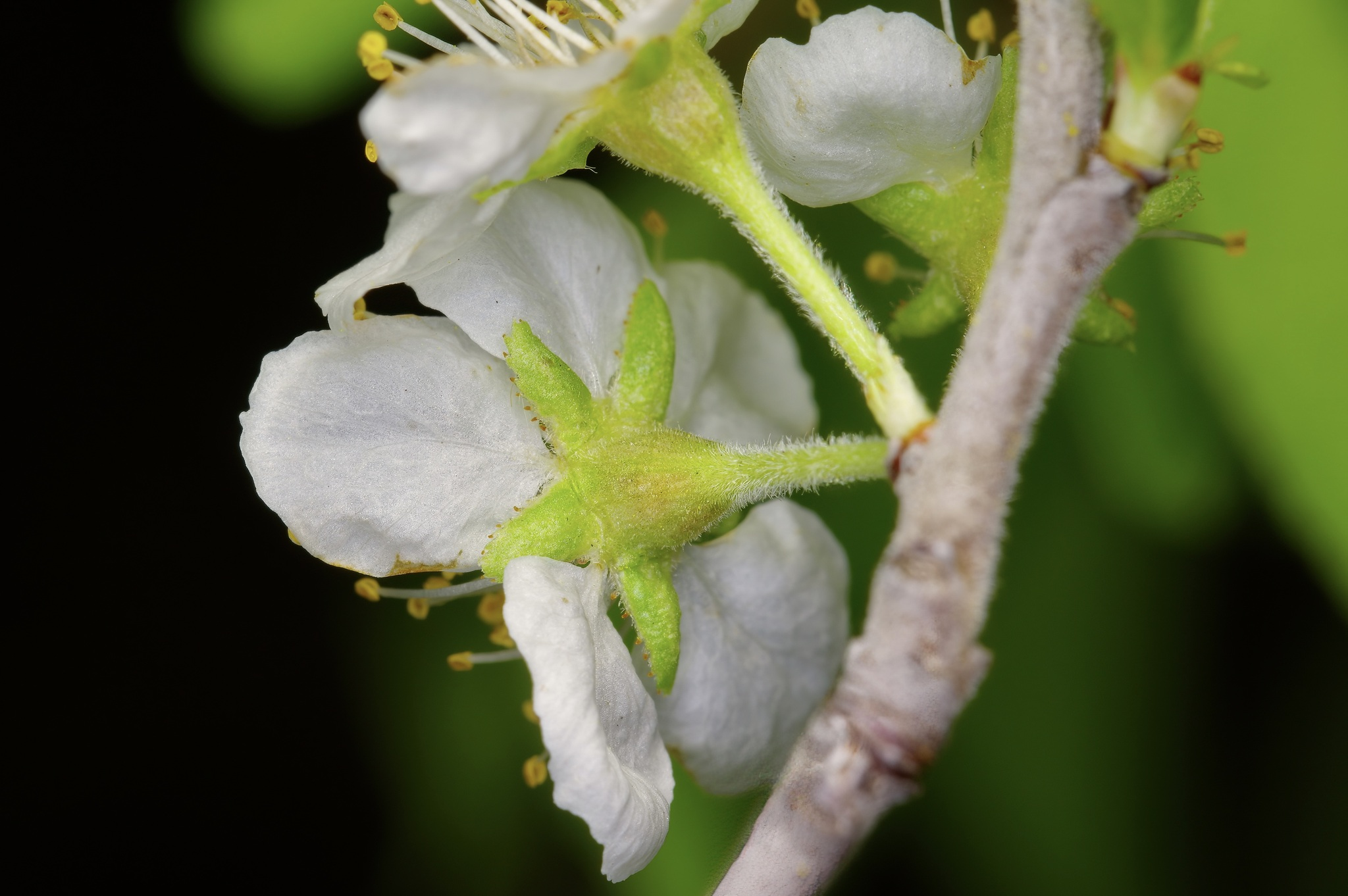
Hairy pedicel
