= Prunus × orthosepala =

Scientific classification
- Kingdom: Plantae
- Clade: Tracheophytes
- Clade: Angiosperms
- Clade: Eudicots
- Clade: Rosids
- Order: Rosales
- Family: Rosaceae
- Genus: Prunus
- Subgenus: Prunus subg. Prunus
- Section: Prunus sect. Prunocerasus
- Species: P. × orthosepala

Binomial name
- Prunus × orthosepala Koehne

Hybrid species of tree

Prunus × orthosepala is a nothospecies of shrubby plum native to North America, in the southern and central United States. It is a naturally occurring hybrid of Chickasaw plum, Prunus angustifolia, and American plum, Prunus americana, found where their ranges overlap.
