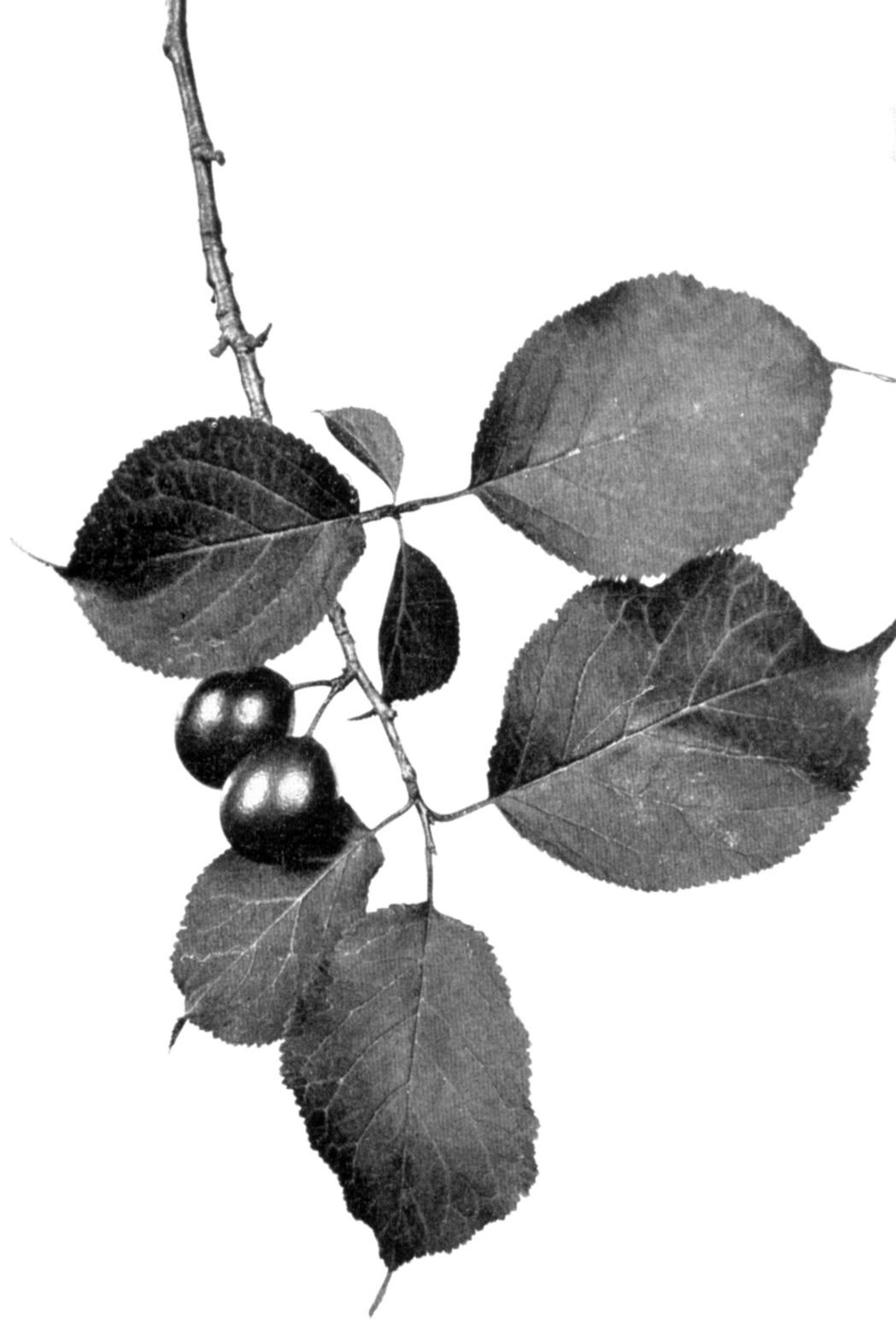
- Prunus nigra

Scientific classification
- Kingdom: Plantae
- Clade: Tracheophytes
- Clade: Angiosperms
- Clade: Eudicots
- Clade: Rosids
- Order: Rosales
- Family: Rosaceae
- Genus: Prunus
- Subgenus: Prunus subg. Prunus
- Section: Prunus sect. Prunocerasus; Koehne

Species
- See text

= Prunus sect. Prunocerasus =

Group of trees

Prunus sect. Prunocerasus (meaning plum-cherry) is a section of the genus Prunus. Koehne originally described it as comprising the North American plums and placed it in the subgenus Cerasus. The section is now generally recognized as belonging to Prunus subg. Prunus.

Species attributed to this section include:

- P. alleghaniensis Porter
- P. americana Marshall
- P. angustifolia Marshall
- P. geniculata R.M.Harper
- P. gracilis Engelm. & A.Gray
- P. hortulana L.H.Bailey
- P. maritima Marshall
- P. mexicana S.Watson
- P. munsoniana Wight & Hedrick
- P. murrayana E.J.Palmer
- P. nigra Aiton
- P. × orthosepala Koehne
- P. × palmeri Sarg.
- P. rivularis Scheele
- P. × slavinii Palmer ex Rehder
- P. subcordata Benth.
- P. texana D.Dietr.
- P. umbellata Elliott
