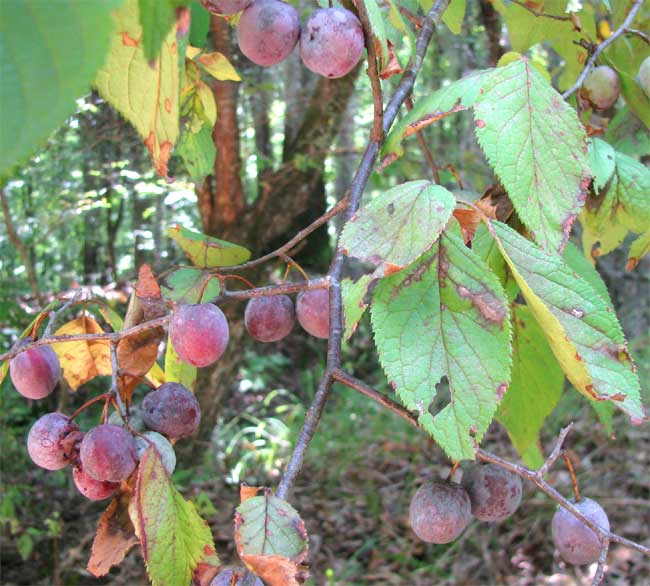

Conservation status
- Least Concern (IUCN 3.1)

Scientific classification
- Kingdom: Plantae
- Clade: Embryophytes
- Clade: Tracheophytes
- Clade: Angiosperms
- Clade: Eudicots
- Clade: Rosids
- Order: Rosales
- Family: Rosaceae
- Genus: Prunus
- Subgenus: Prunus subg. Prunus
- Section: Prunus sect. Prunocerasus
- Species: P. mexicana

Binomial name
- Prunus mexicana S.Watson
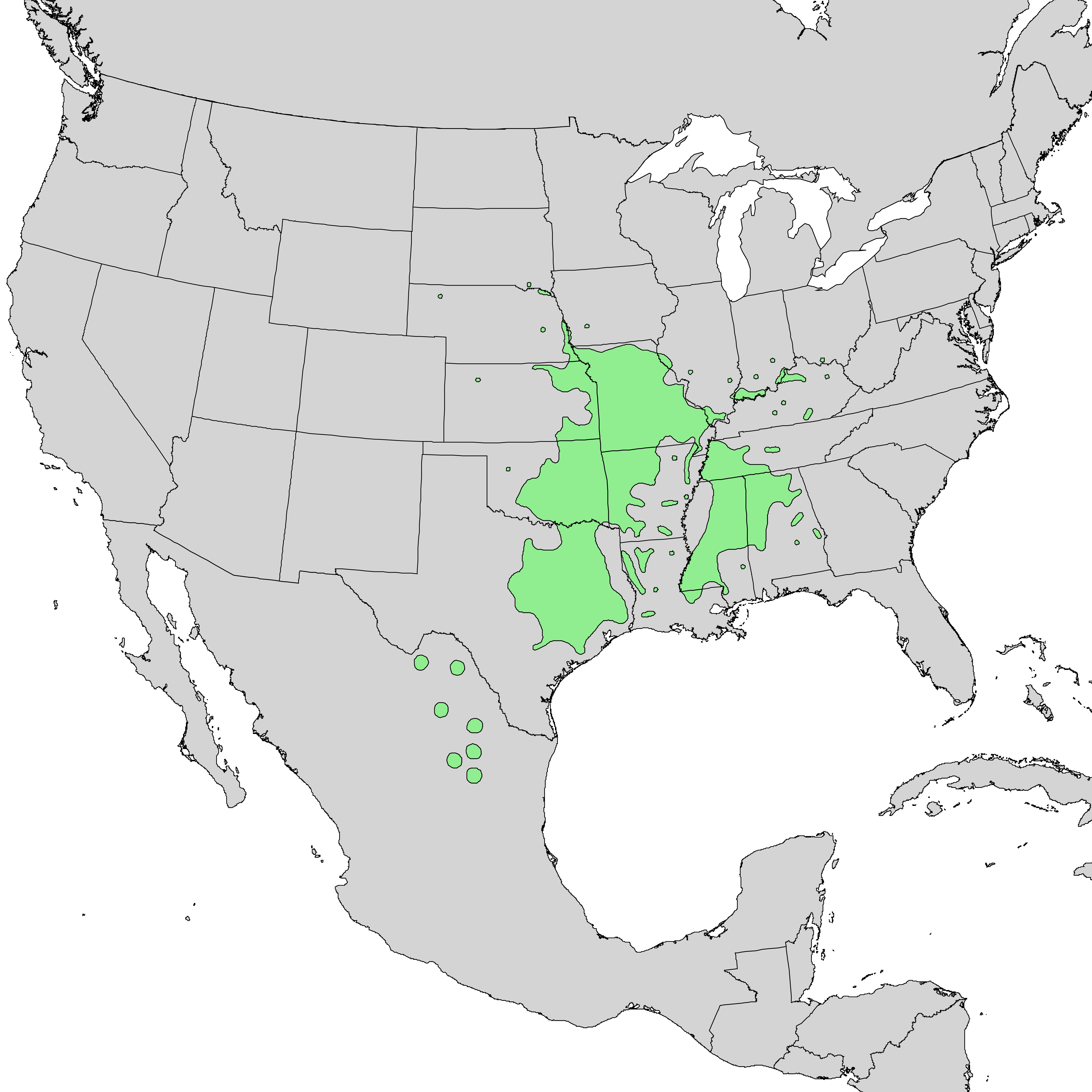
- Generalized natural range of Prunus mexicana

Synonyms
- Prunus lanata (Sudw.) Mack. & Bush; Prunus mexicana var. fultonensis (Sarg.) Sarg.; Prunus mexicana var. polyandra (Sarg.) Sarg.; Prunus pensylvanica var. mollis (Douglas ex Hook.) B.Boivin; Prunus americana var. lanata Sudw.; Prunus palmeri Sarg.; Prunus polyandra Sarg.; Prunus reticulata Sarg.

= Prunus mexicana =

Species of tree

Prunus mexicana, commonly known as the Mexican plum, inch plum, or bigtree plum, is a North American species of plum tree.

== Description ==
Prunus mexicana has a single trunk and an open crown, and reaches a height of 4.5–11.5 meters (15–38 feet). Its dark gray bark is banded with horizontal lenticels. It has dark green, simple ovate leaves 5–11.5 centimeters (2–4 1/2 inches) long and 3–5 cm (1 1/4–2 in) wide.

In the early spring, it is covered with five-petaled, fragrant, white or pale pink flowers 1.8–2.5 cm (3/4–1 in) wide. The dark red or purple fruit ripen late in the fall.

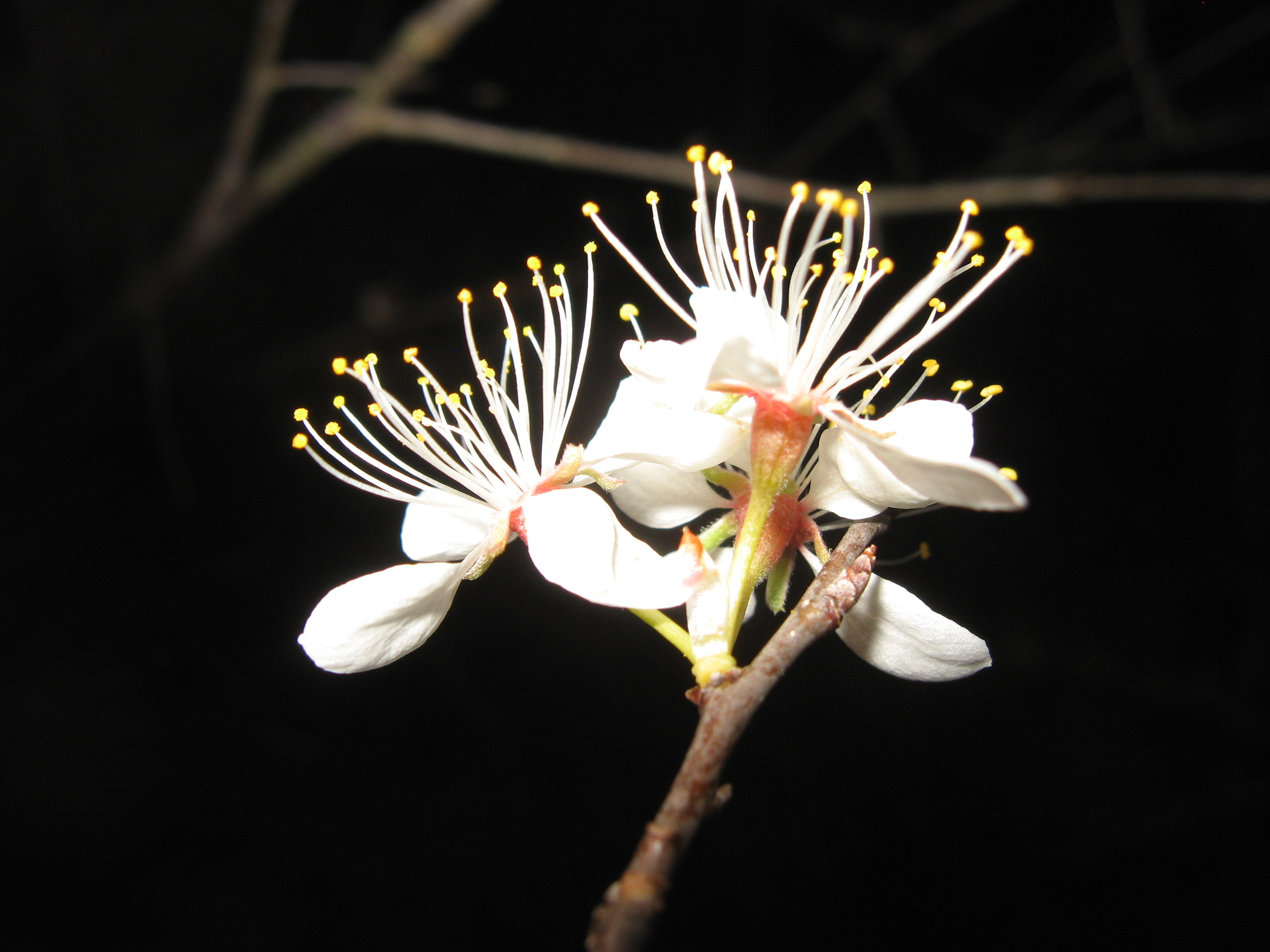
Flowers close-up

=== Similar species ===
P. mexicana is very similar to P. americana and they intergrade along a broad contact zone centered around Arkansas and Missouri. These intermediate individuals, as hybrids, are impossible to assign to a specific species.

== Taxonomy ==
P. mexicana is included in the section Prunocerasus.

== Distribution and habitat ==
The native range of the species stretches from South Dakota east to Wisconsin, Ohio, Kentucky, and Georgia, and south to the Mexican states of Coahuila and San Luis Potosí.

It is usually found on woodland edges or in open fields. It is adaptable to a wide range of soil pH and is drought-tolerant. The trees are hardy in U.S. Department of Agriculture zones 5 to 9.

== Ecology ==
The fruit is eaten fresh by both mammals and birds.

== Uses ==
The fruit is made into preserves and the tree can serve as a rootstock for grafting other plum cultivars.
