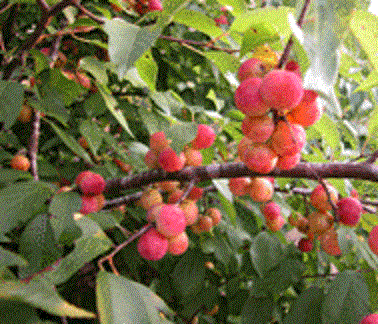

Conservation status
- Data Deficient (IUCN 3.1)

Scientific classification
- Kingdom: Plantae
- Clade: Tracheophytes
- Clade: Angiosperms
- Clade: Eudicots
- Clade: Rosids
- Order: Rosales
- Family: Rosaceae
- Genus: Prunus
- Subgenus: Prunus subg. Prunus
- Section: Prunus sect. Prunocerasus
- Species: P. rivularis

Binomial name
- Prunus rivularis Scheele
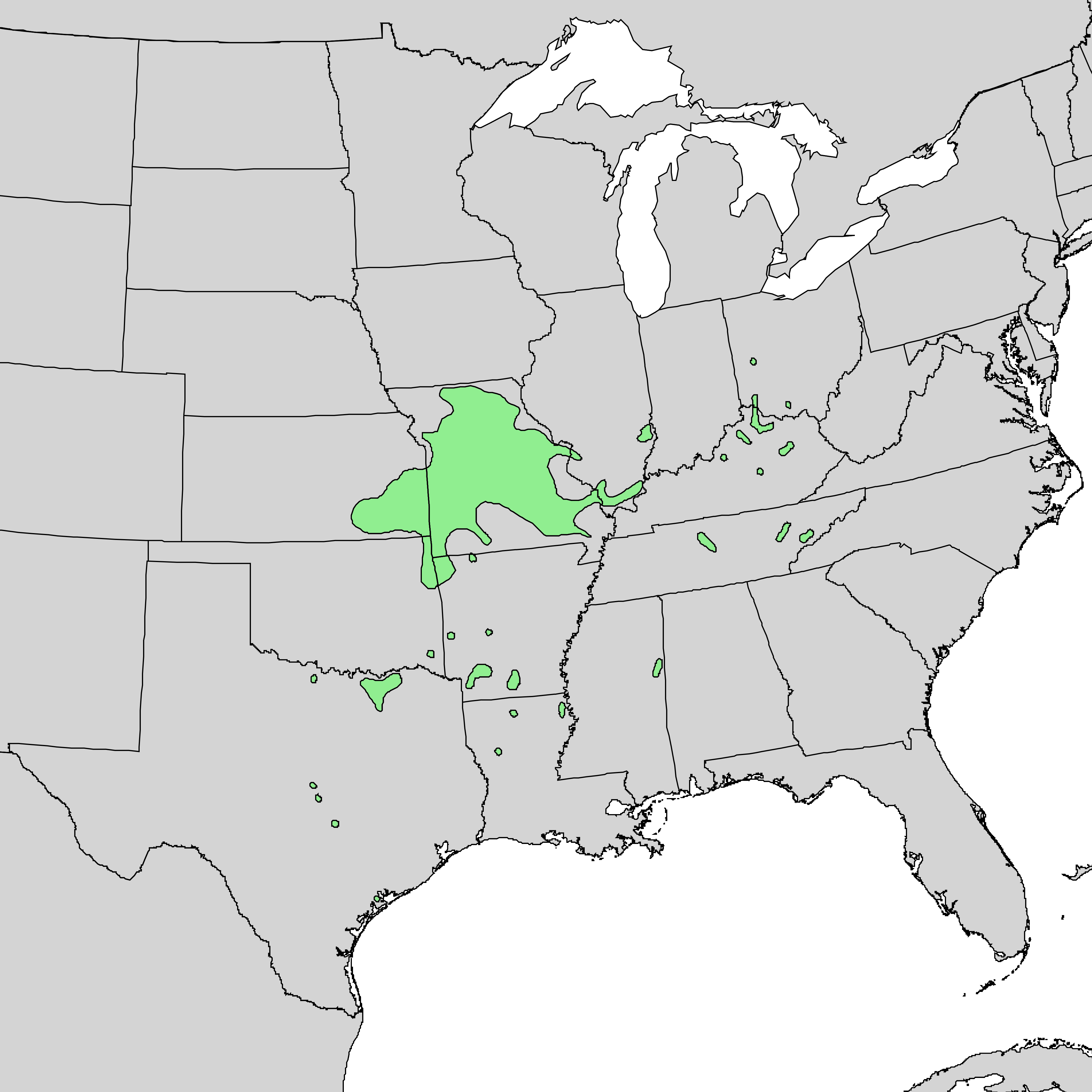
- Natural range (Prunus munsoniana)

Synonyms
- Prunus munsoniana W.Wight & Hedrick; Prunus pygma Munson; Prunus reverchonii Sarg.; Prunus tawakonia Lindh. ex A.Gray (Note: This Prunus tawakonia synonym exists only because Asa Gray chose to mention Lindheimer's suggestion for the epithet while accepting Scheele's.)

= Prunus rivularis =

Species of tree

Prunus rivularis, known variously by the common names creek plum, hog plum, or wild-goose plum is a thicket-forming shrub in the rose family, Rosaceae. It is a deciduous shrub consisting of slender stems with umbel clusters of white blossoms. The fruit is a drupe that resembles a large berry.

The plant is found mainly in the central United States. It prefers calcareous clay soil or limestone-based woodland soils. Although the fruit has a bitter taste, it serves as a source of food for birds and other wildlife.

== Description ==
The leaves are deciduous, simple and alternately arranged along the stems. The general shape of the leaf ranges between elliptic and ovate and is gauged out to be 5–6 centimeters (2–2 1/4 inches) long and 2–3 cm (3/4–1 1/4 in) wide. The base shape of the leaf is considered cuneate while the apex is acuminate. The margin or edges is described as serrate; usually with 10–11 teeth per centimeter.

The flowers of this plant usually blossom around March to April. The inflorescence type is considered a raceme, where there are flower spikes from stalks that pawn out from the stem. The flowers themselves stretch in entirety to 12–16 millimeters (1/2–5/8 in). They occur in clusters of 2 to 8 on leaf axils. The pedicels on which the flowers are attached measure to 15–16 mm. They have a green and glabrous surface. The glabrous hypanthium is considered the floral tube. P. rivularis is defined as a perigynous plant. The hypanthium's length and width is measured out to be 2 to 2.5 mm, respectively. The calyx lobes, or sepals of a flower, are found in a cluster of 5. The sepal has an oblong leaf shape and is measured 2 millimeters. The apex has a flat tip or truncate shape. There is a sugar-producing gland at the tip in which the leaves cup around. The margins are ciliate and the sides are pubescent. There are 5 white petals that are measured with a length of 5 mm. The petal margins are cupped and have an undulated (wavy) shape. There are on average of 20 stamen; the filaments are long and slender, 4–6 mm long while the anthers have a yellowish tint. The stamen is planted on the base of the hypanthium where the ovary is placed in the superior position. The ovary has a dark green hue and is measured 1–1.5 mm long while the style is white and is measured 5–6 mm long.

The fruit ripens in late July. It is a drupe with a stony endocarp, fleshy mesocarp and soft exocarp. They can appear alone or in a cluster of 2 or 3 other fruits. The pedicel that stems from the fruit is slender and glabrous, measured to be 13–16 mm long. The fruit shape is globular and has an orangeish-reddish tint. It is 17–22 mm long as it is wide. It has a very juicy mesocarp, though it is quite bitter in taste. The endocarp is 9–11 mm wide and 13–15 mm thick.

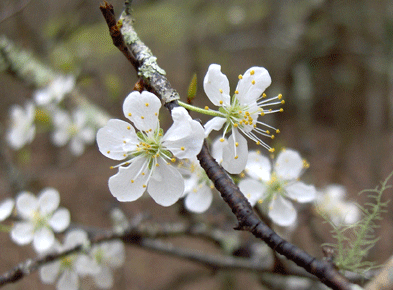
Flowers

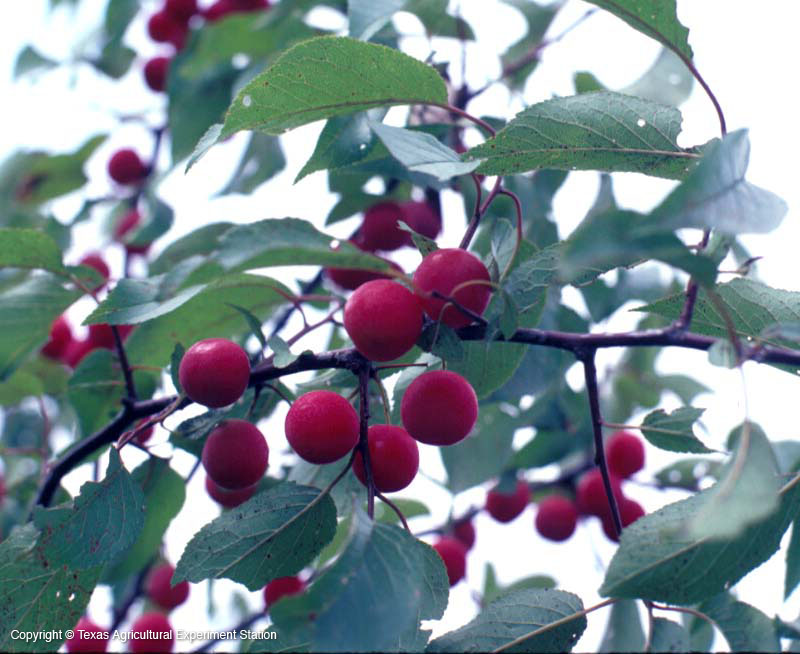
Fruits and foliage

== Etymology ==
Prunus is Latin for plum, whereas rivularis means being near a stream.

== Distribution and habitat ==
Prunus rivularis is native to the United States; found in California, Arkansas, southern Illinois, south-eastern Kansas, Kentucky, northern Louisiana, Mississippi, Missouri, southwestern Ohio, Oklahoma, Tennessee, and Texas. It can be found in a variety of places in nature: places like creeksides, wooden canyons, bottom of valleys and flooded plains. This plant grows on limestone-based woodland or sandy soil. The moisture of the soil can vary between dry and moist, though the soil has to be well drained. (In other words, water is readily removed from the soil). The preferred pH is slightly more alkaline (greater than 7.2). It is hardy to levels of 6–9 because of its varied distribution. This implies that the USDA zones, or geographically designated zones of temperature of which plants can grow under, are found in the southern U.S. The temperature ranges between −10 and 30 °F (−23 and −1 °C). Because of the range of dispersion, the amount of precipitation this plant can experience is anywhere from 610 to 1,220 mm (24 to 48 in) per year.

== Ecology ==
The fruits produced are usually consumed by birds and other mammals. The flowers are known to attract insects such as butterflies and bees.

=== Medicinal ===
All members of the genus Prunus contain amygdalin and prunasin. These compounds are found in leaves and seeds. These substances can form hydrogen cyanide through subsequent reactions in water.

== Uses ==
The leaves can be used to produce dyes ranging from green to dark gray.

The fruit was eaten by American Indians in Texas.
