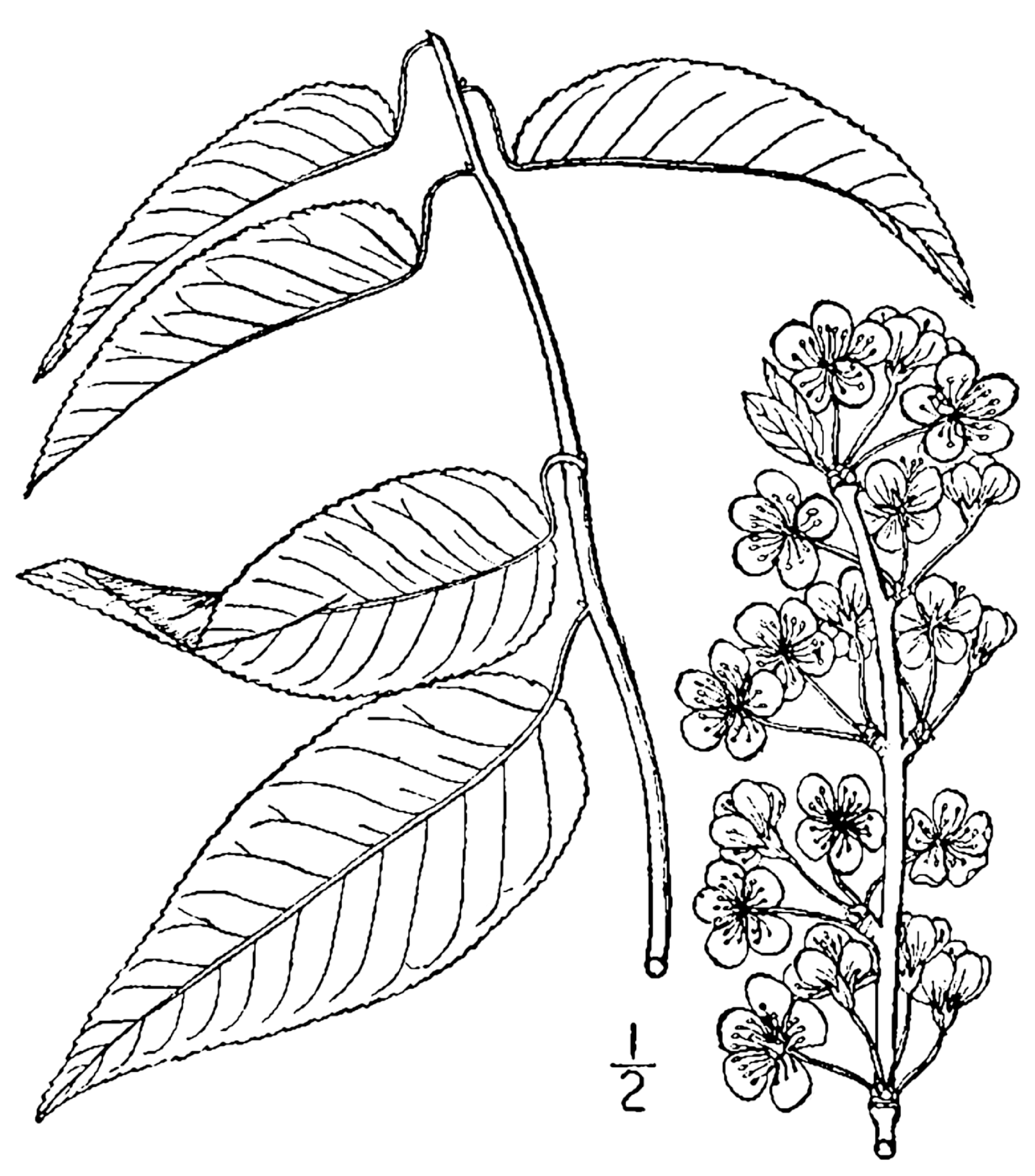
- 1913 illustration

Conservation status
- Least Concern (IUCN 3.1)

Scientific classification
- Kingdom: Plantae
- Clade: Embryophytes
- Clade: Tracheophytes
- Clade: Angiosperms
- Clade: Eudicots
- Clade: Rosids
- Order: Rosales
- Family: Rosaceae
- Genus: Prunus
- Subgenus: Prunus subg. Prunus
- Section: Prunus sect. Prunocerasus
- Species: P. hortulana

Binomial name
- Prunus hortulana L.H.Bailey

= Prunus hortulana =

Species of tree

Prunus hortulana, called the hortulan plum and wild goose plum, is a North American fruit shrub in the rose family.

== Description ==
Prunus hortulana is a deciduous tree with a height of 6 metres (20 feet) or more and a trunk diameter of up to 15 centimetres (6 inches). The leaves are green and hairless on the top, but hairy on the underside. Clusters of 2–4 white flowers bloom in the spring. The fruits appear in late summer. They are red or yellow drupes with white dots, with a sweet and pleasant flavor.

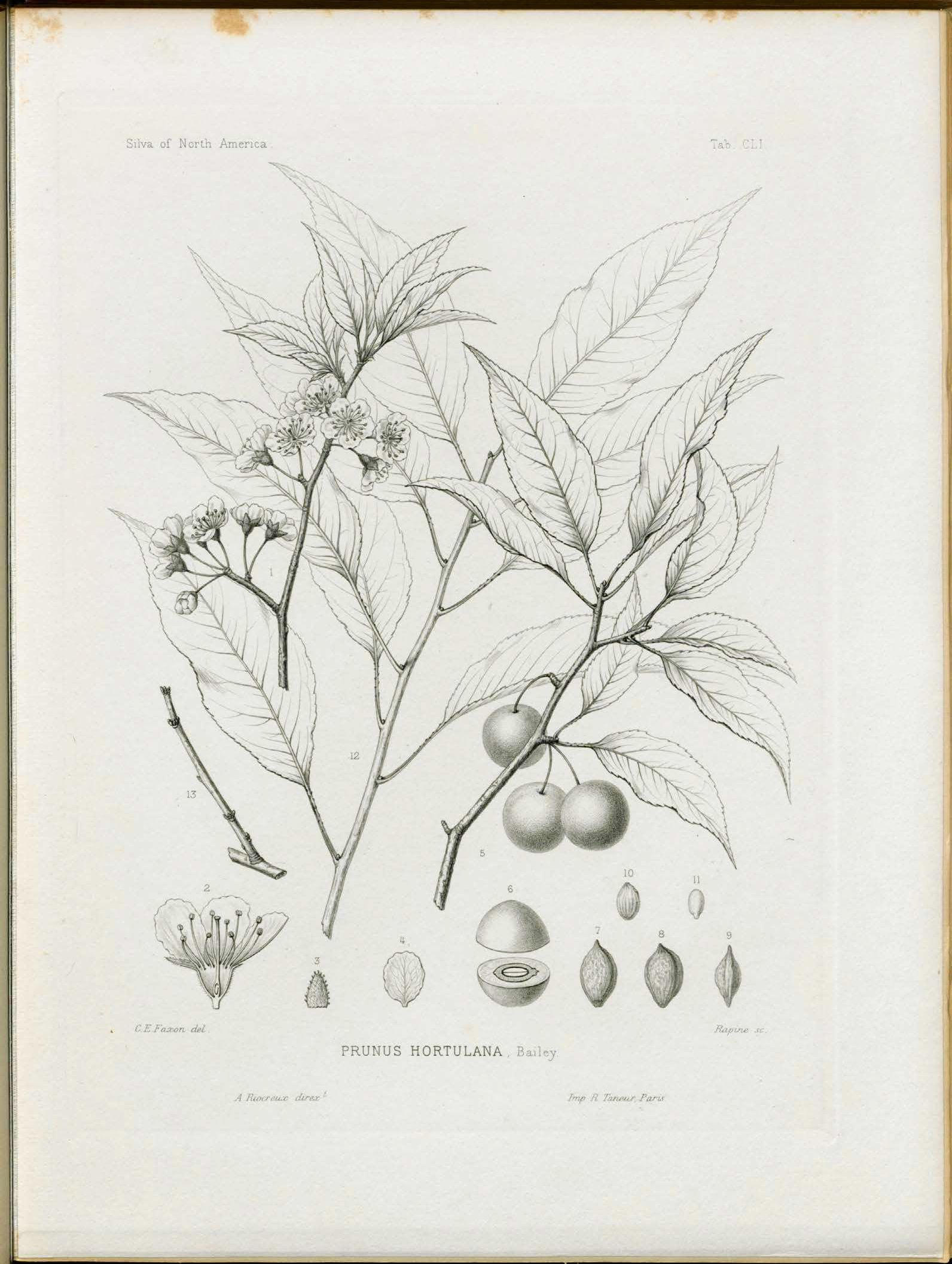
Foliage and fruit illustration

== Taxonomy ==
American botanist Liberty Hyde Bailey described the species in 1892.

There are several domesticated cultivars and hybrids with other Prunus.

== Distribution and habitat ==
The species is found in the central United States in: Arkansas, Iowa, Illinois, Indiana, Kansas, Kentucky, Massachusetts, Maryland, Missouri, Nebraska, Ohio, Oklahoma, Tennessee, Texas, Virginia, West Virginia. Populations east of the Appalachians probably represent naturalizations.

The tree grows in upland forests and near streams.

== Uses ==
The fruit is edible.
