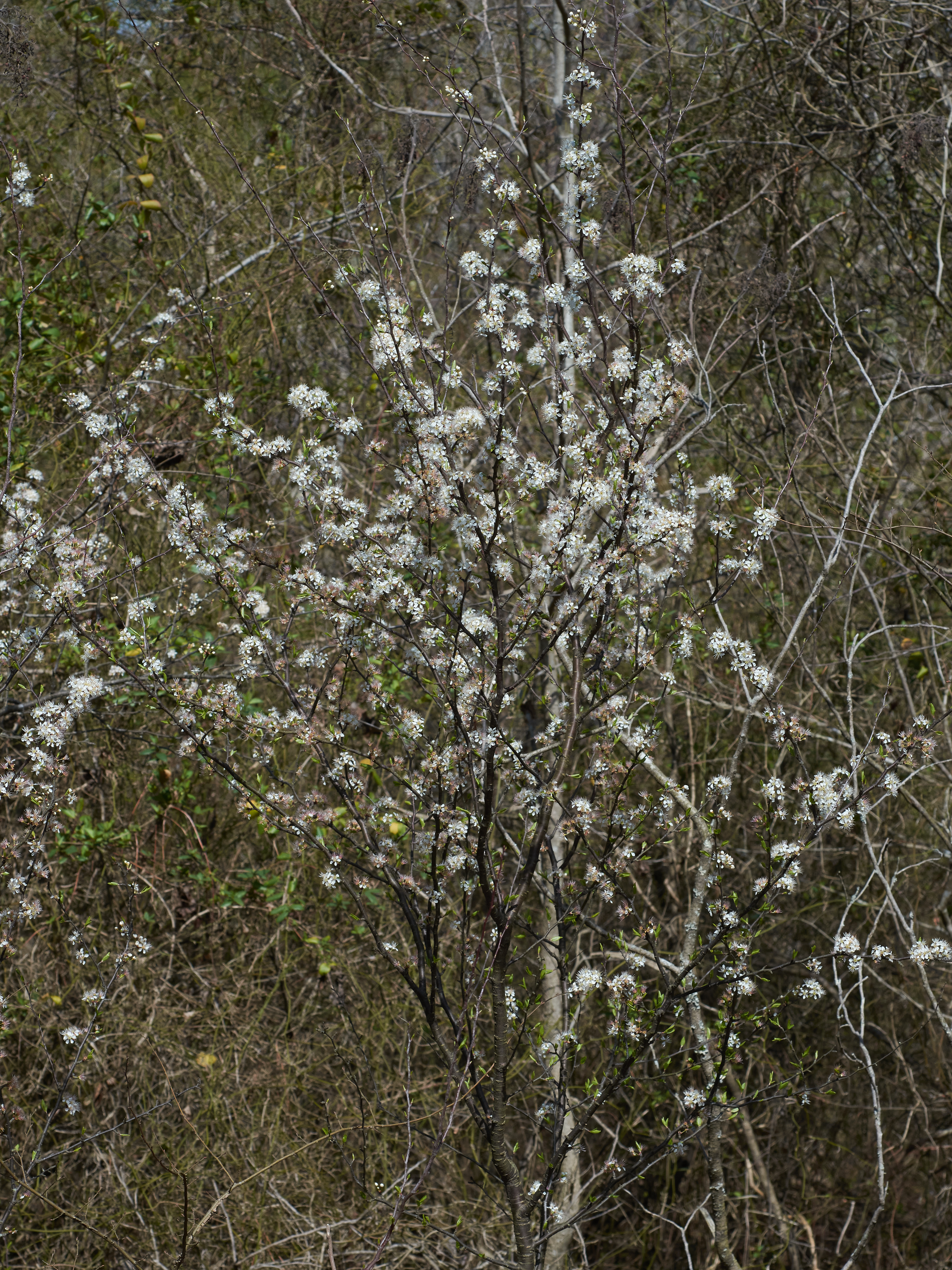

Conservation status
- Least Concern (IUCN 3.1)

Scientific classification
- Kingdom: Plantae
- Clade: Embryophytes
- Clade: Tracheophytes
- Clade: Angiosperms
- Clade: Eudicots
- Clade: Rosids
- Order: Rosales
- Family: Rosaceae
- Genus: Prunus
- Subgenus: Prunus subg. Prunus
- Section: Prunus sect. Prunocerasus
- Species: P. angustifolia

Binomial name
- Prunus angustifolia Marsh.
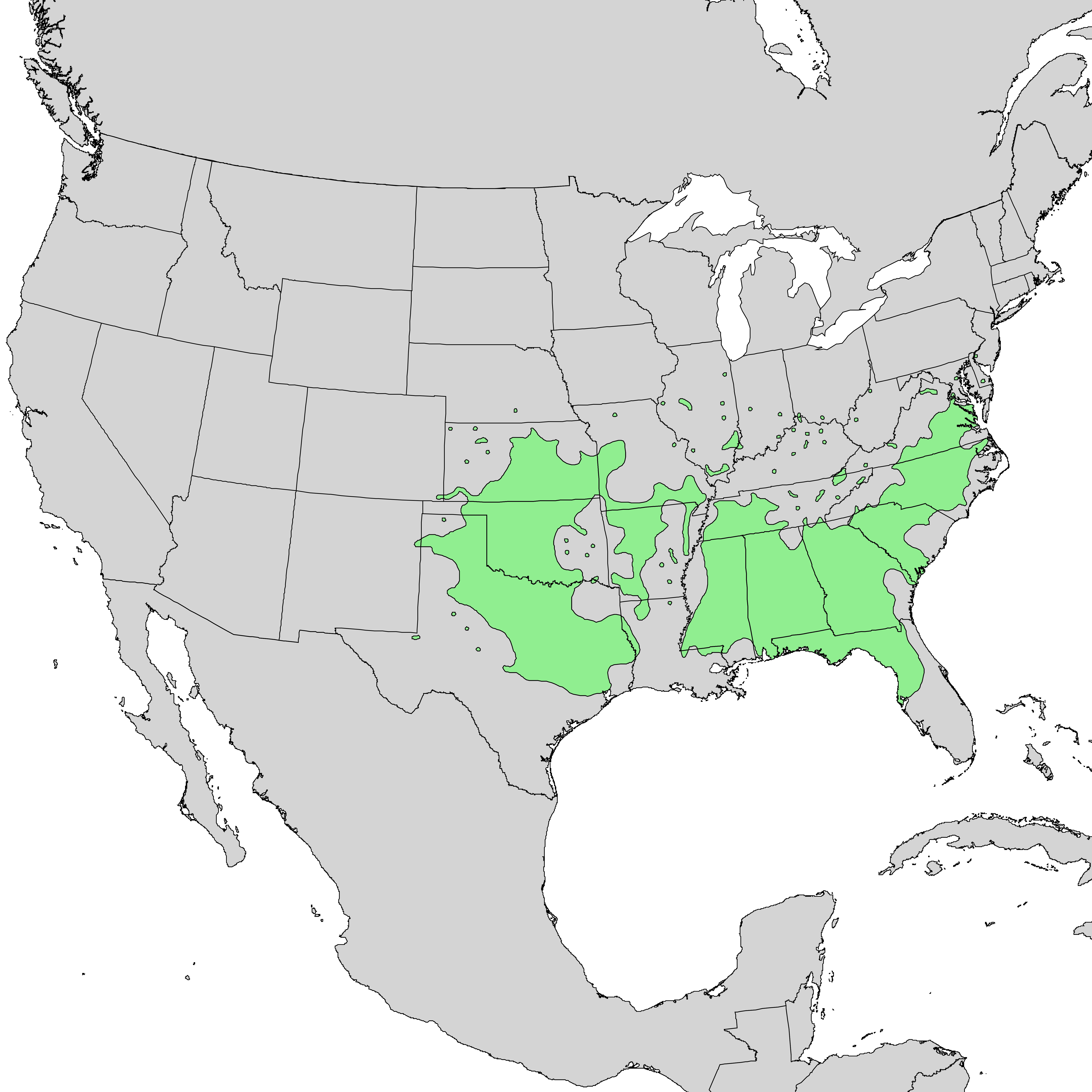
- Natural range of Prunus angustifolia

Synonyms
- Prunus stenophylla Raf.; Prunus angustifolia subsp. varians W.Wight & Hedrick; Prunus watsonii Sarg.; Prunus chicasa Michx.

= Prunus angustifolia =

Species of tree

Prunus angustifolia, known commonly as Chickasaw plum, Cherokee plum, Florida sand plum, sandhill plum, or sand plum, is a North American species of plum-bearing tree.

== Description ==
Chickasaw plum grows 3.7 to 6.1 meters (12 to 20 feet) tall and 4.6 to 6.1 m (15 to 20 ft) wide in an irregular shape. It is "twiggy" in nature, and has a scaly, almost black bark. Its branches are reddish with thornlike, small side branches.

From February to May, small white flowers blossom, 8–10 millimeters (5/16–3/8 inch) wide, along with red plums, up to 25 mm (1 in) long. The flowers have five white petals with reddish or orange anthers. The plums are cherry-like and tend to be quite tart until they fully ripen. They ripen in late summer. It requires low to medium amounts of water to grow, and dry, sandy or loose soil. It grows best in areas with regular sunlight or areas of partial shade. In sunny areas, it will be more dense and colonize thickly. In areas of partial shade, it will be thinner and less dense, and each plant will be more spread out.

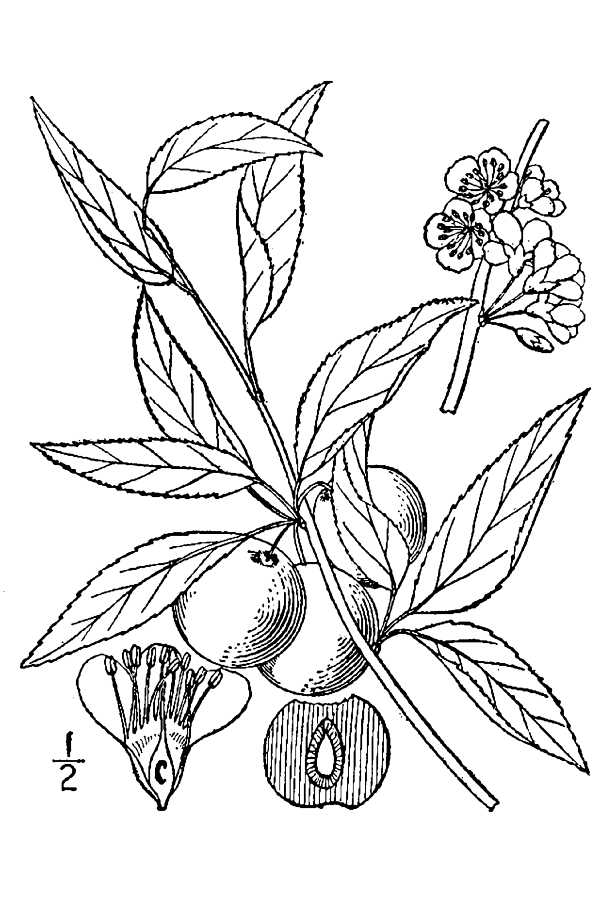
Illustration

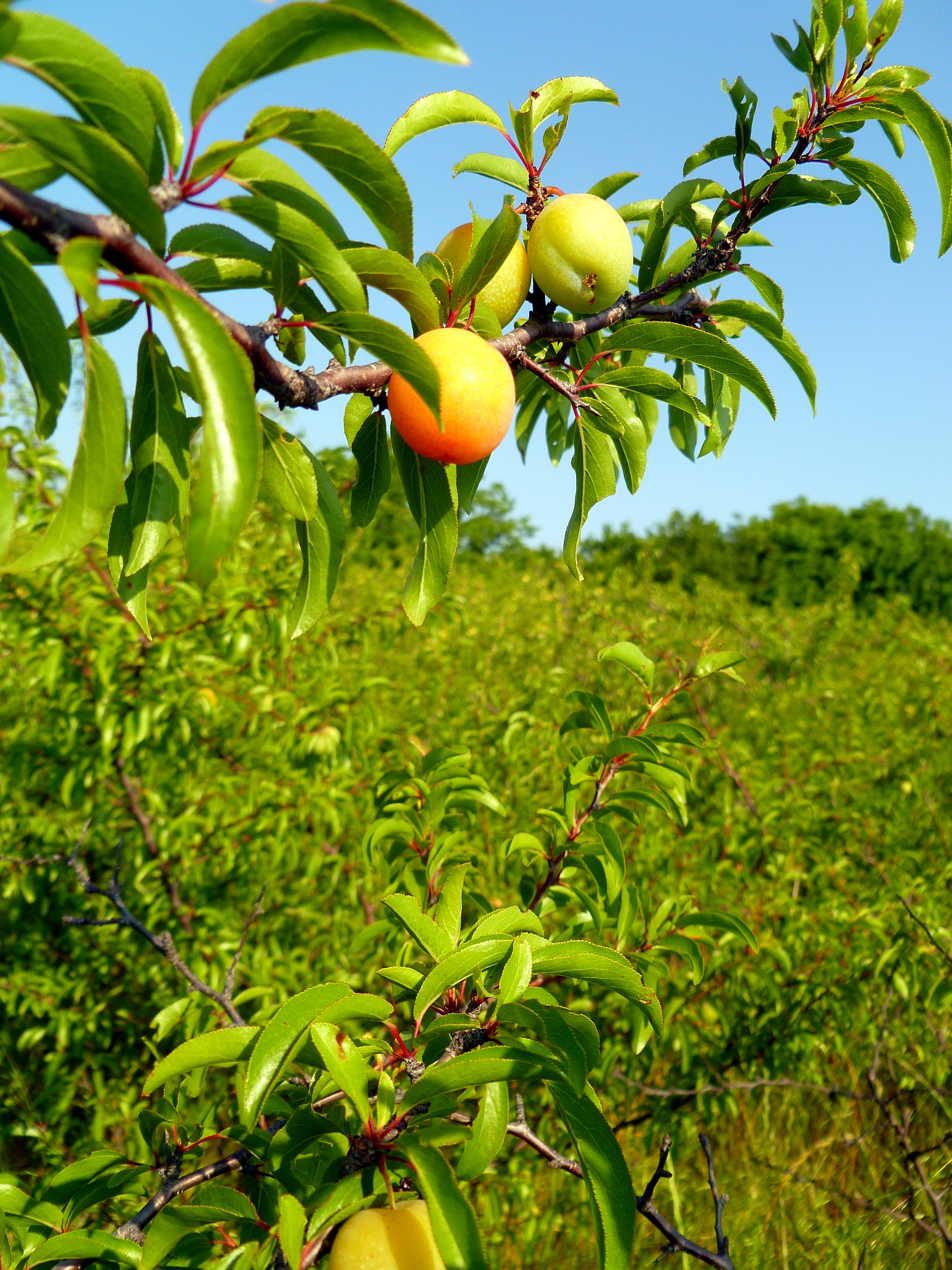
Ripening plum

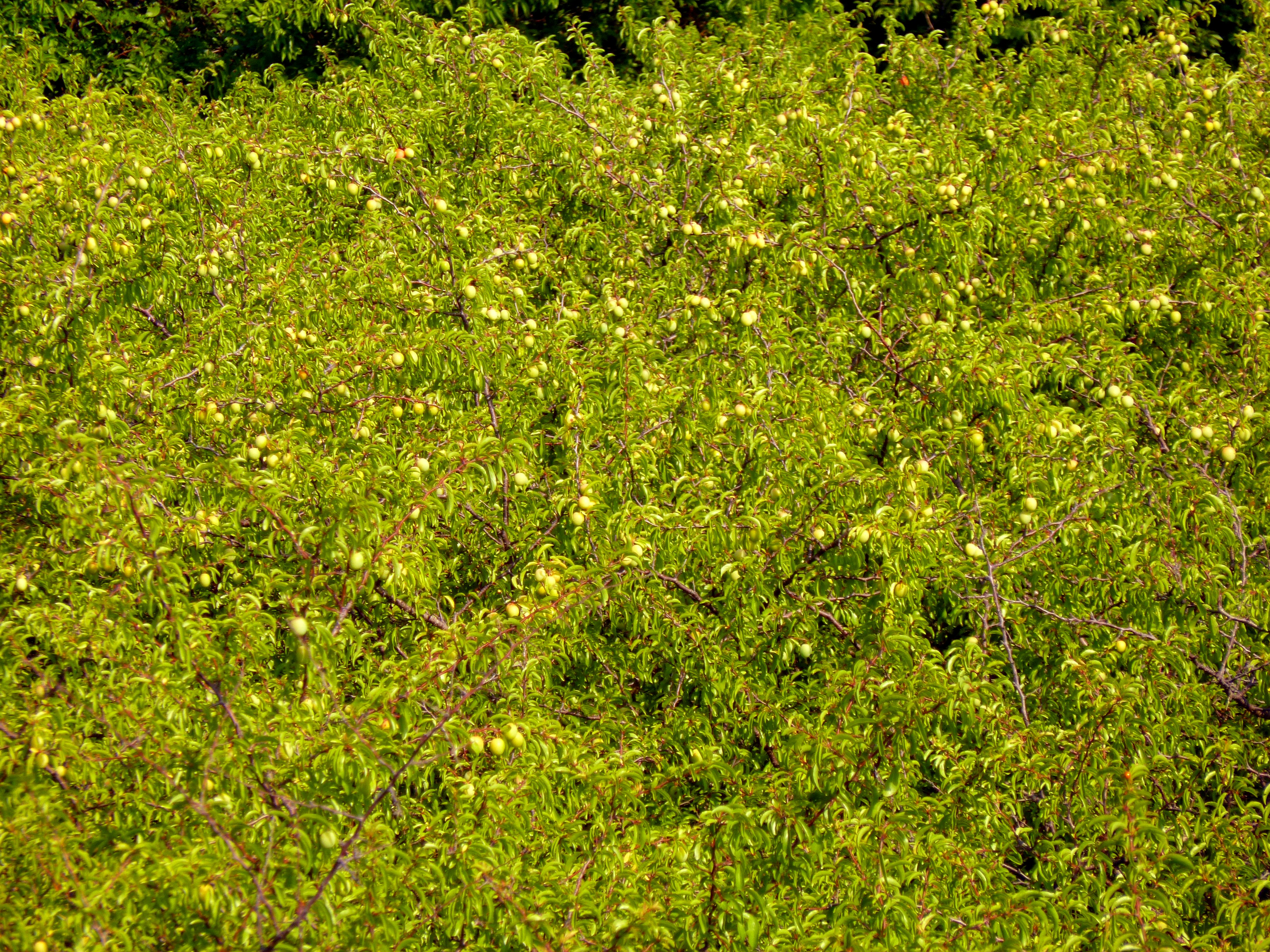
Thicket

=== Similar species ===
P. angustifolia is very difficult to distinguish from P. umbellata, with which it hybridizes easily.

== Taxonomy ==
American plum (Prunus americana Marsh.) hybridizes naturally with P. angustifolia to produce P. × orthosepala Koehne.

The specific epithet, angustifolia, refers to the plant's narrow leaves.

== Distribution and habitat ==
P. angustifolia is widespread across much of the eastern and central United States from Florida west as far as New Mexico and California, north to Nebraska, Illinois, and New Jersey, with a few isolated populations in northern Michigan.

The species grows in dry and sandy soils, such as open woodlands, woodland edges, forest openings, savannahs, prairies, plains, meadows, pastures, and roadsides. They are often found growing wild along highways, especially in the southern U.S.

It is listed by the U.S. Department of Agriculture as an endangered species in the state of New Jersey.

== Ecology ==
It is used by many species as a larval host, including the black-waved flannel moth, the blinded sphinx, the cecropia moth, the coral hairstreak, the elm sphinx, the hummingbird clearwing moth, the imperial moth, the Io moth, the polyphemus moth, the promethea silkmoth, the red-spotted purple, the small-eyed sphinx, the spring azure, the striped hairstreak, and the tiger swallowtail.

== Cultivation ==
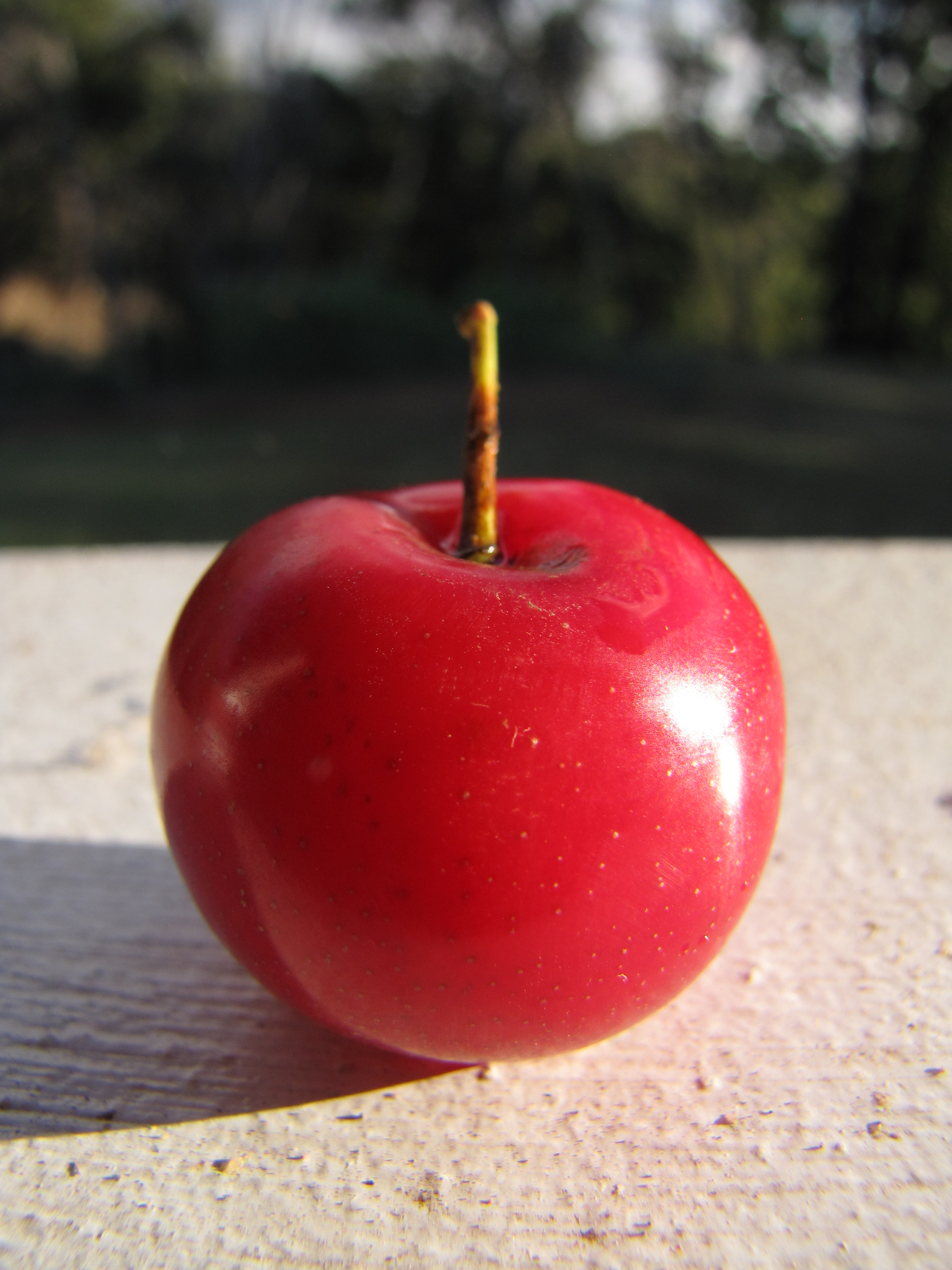
A ripe Methley plum, a hybrid of P. salicina and P. cerasifera. A common parent in Auburn University plum releases, along with P. angustifolia.

The species was originally cultivated by Native Americans before the arrival of Europeans.

Chickasaw plums tend to bloom early in the spring before many other plants bloom, and require very little maintenance; as a result, they are often used in ornamental horticulture.

Chickasaw plum is sometimes grown for fruit production. In this instance, it is often hybridized with the related P. salicina (Japanese plum) for improved traits such as fruit size. These hybrids frequently have superior disease resistance required for growing plums in the disease-heavy southeastern U.S. Some known plum varieties with Chickasaw plum parentage are:

- AU-Amber
- AU-Cherry
- AU-Rosa
- Bruce
- Byrongold
- Robusto
- Segundo

Pure P. angustifolia selections with superior fruit exist as well, such as Guthrie.

== Uses ==
The 1/2-in. edible fruits change from yellow to red when fully ripe. They may be eaten raw and are often made into jellies. Because of its attractive bark, small leaves and thin branches, Chickasaw plum is also sometimes used for bonsai.

== In culture ==
It became the official state fruit of Kansas in 2022.
