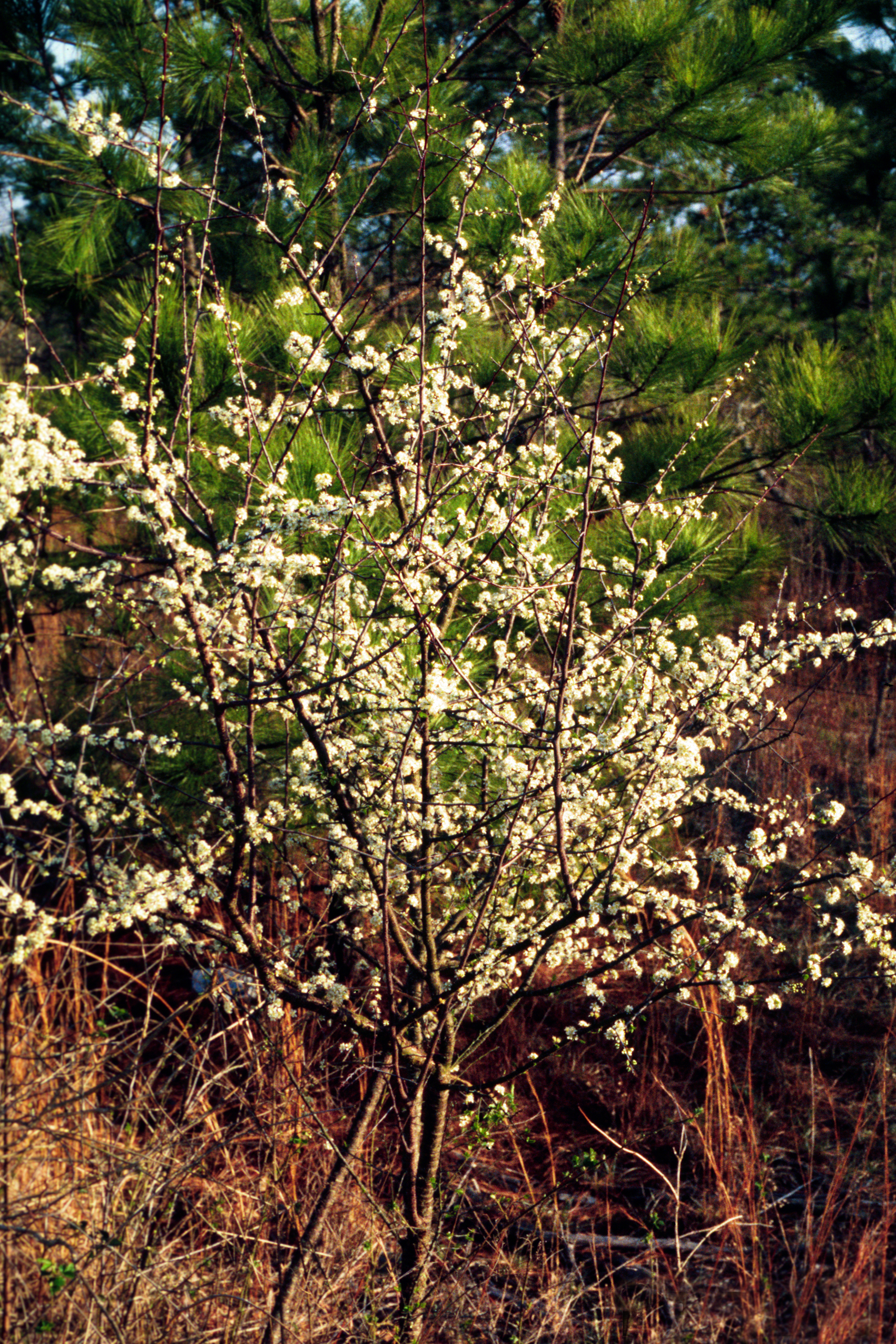
- Prunus umbellata bush

Conservation status
- Least Concern (IUCN 3.1)

Scientific classification
- Kingdom: Plantae
- Clade: Tracheophytes
- Clade: Angiosperms
- Clade: Eudicots
- Clade: Rosids
- Order: Rosales
- Family: Rosaceae
- Genus: Prunus
- Subgenus: Prunus subg. Prunus
- Section: Prunus sect. Prunocerasus
- Species: P. umbellata

Binomial name
- Prunus umbellata Elliott

Synonyms
- List: Prunus mitis Beadle; Prunus tarda Sarg.; Prunus umbellata var. tarda (Sarg.) W.Wight; Prunus injucunda Small; Prunus injuncunda Small

= Prunus umbellata =

Species of tree

Prunus umbellata, called flatwoods plum, hog plum and sloe plum, is a plum species native to the United States from Virginia, south to Florida, and west to Texas.

Prunus umbellata can reach 6.1 meters (20 feet) in height with a 4.6 m (15 ft) spread. It has alternate serrate green leaves that turn yellow in autumn. Flowers are white, creamy, or grayish. Fruits are round, purple, and 1.3–2.5 centimeters (1/2–1 inch) in diameter. The trees bloom and bear fruit later than other plums. The fruits mature August–October. Large crops appear only every 3–4 years.

P. umbellata trees can live up to 40 years and are very difficult to distinguish from P. angustifolia, with which it hybridizes easily.

The fruits are made into jellies and jams.

== Gallery ==
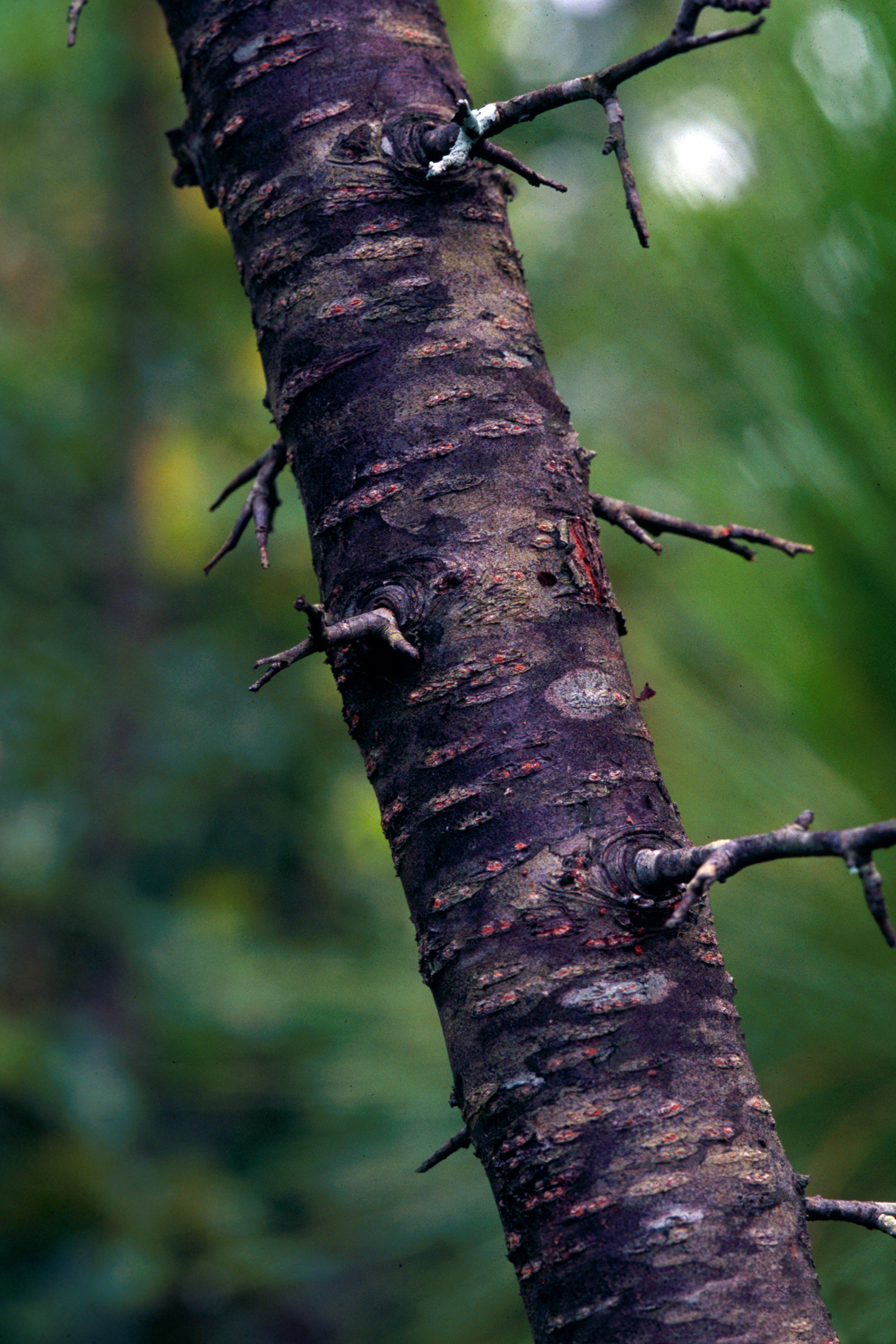

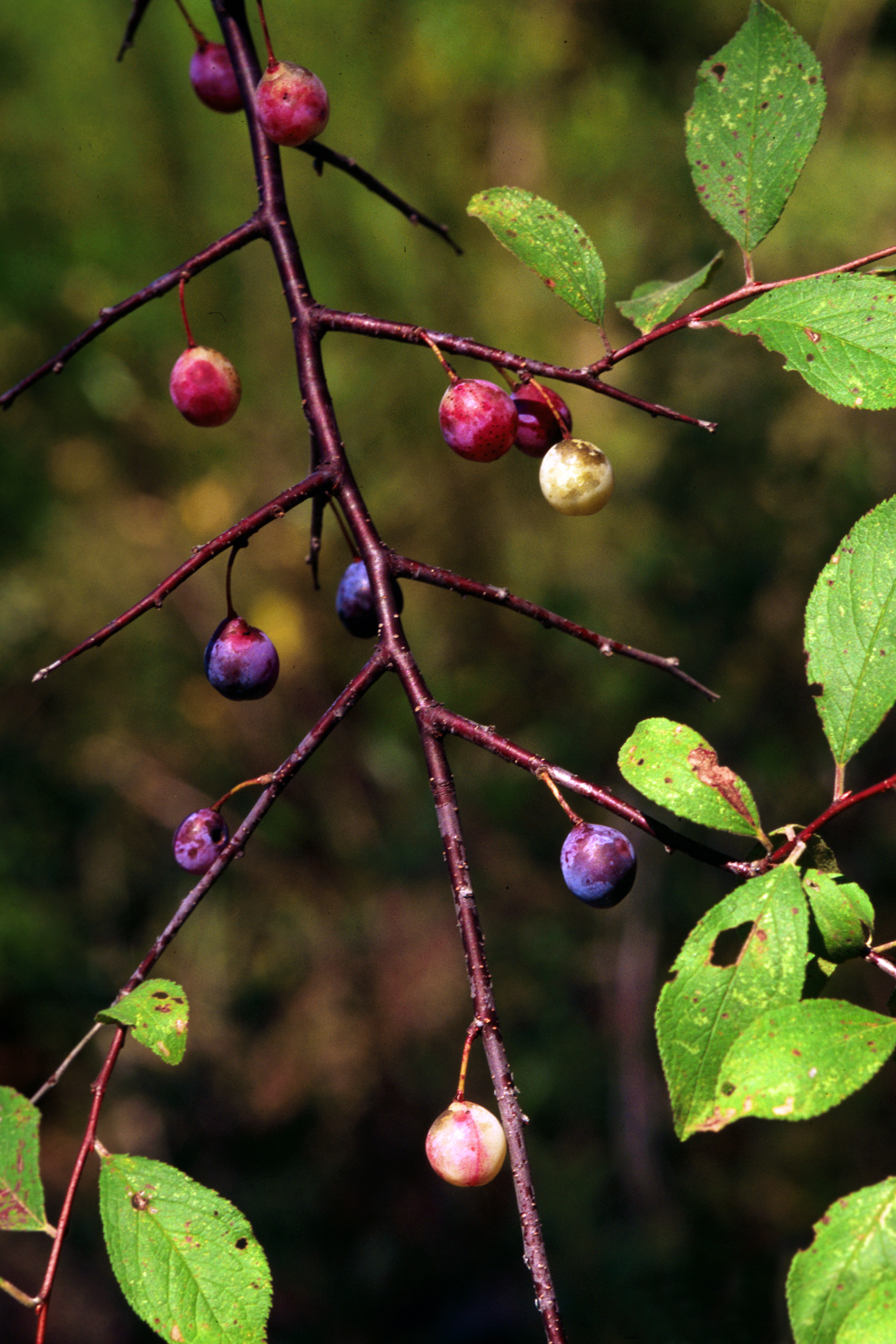
