= List of Lepidoptera of Bermuda =

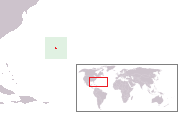
Location of Bermuda

Lepidoptera of Bermuda consist of both the butterflies and moths recorded from the island of Bermuda.

According to a recent estimate, there are a total of 183 Lepidoptera species present in Bermuda.

== Butterflies ==
=== Hesperiidae ===
- Calpodes ethlius (Stoll, [1782])
- Hylephila phyleus (Drury, 1773)

=== Nymphalidae ===
- Agraulis vanillae nigrior Michener, 1942
- Danaus gilippus berenice (Cramer, 1779)
- Danaus plexippus (Linnaeus, 1758)
- Junonia coenia bergi Avinoff, 1926
- Nymphalis antiopa (Linnaeus, 1758)
- Vanessa atalanta rubria (Fruhstorfer, 1909)
- Vanessa cardui (Linnaeus, 1758)
- Vanessa virginiensis (Drury, 1773)

=== Papilionidae ===
- Papilio cresphontes Cramer, [1777]

=== Pieridae ===
- Colias eurytheme Boisduval, 1852
- Colias philodice Godart, 1819
- Eurema lisa Boisduval & LeConte (1829)
- Phoebis sennae eubule (Linnaeus, 1767)
- Pieris rapae (Linnaeus, 1758)

== Moths ==
=== Arctiidae ===
- Cisseps fulvicollis (Hübner, [1818])
- Pyrrharctia isabella (JE Smith, 1797)
- Utetheisa bella (Linnaeus, 1758)

=== Blastobasidae ===
- Holcocera guilandinae (Busck, 1900)

=== Bucculatricidae ===
- Bucculatrix rhombophora Meyrick, 1926

=== Coleophoridae ===
- Batrachedra decoctor bermudensis Hodges, (1966)
- Coleophora anisota Meyrick, 1927
- Coleophora texanella Chambers, 1878

=== Cosmopterigidae ===
- Cosmopterix attenuatella (Walker, 1864)
- Cosmopterix pulchrimella Chambers, 1875
- Cosmopterix sp. near minutella Bett.
- Pyroderces badia (Hodges, 1962)

=== Crambidae ===
- Achyra rantalis (Guenée, 1854)
- Argyria lacteella (Fabricius, 1794)
- Ategumia ebulealis (Guenee, 1854)
- Crambus quinquareatus Zeller, 1877
- Diacme elealis (Walker, 1859)
- Diaphania hyalinata (Linnaeus, 1767)
- Diaphania nitidalis (Stoll, 1781)
- Eustixia pupula Hübner, 1823
- Glyphodes sibillalis Walker, 1859
- Hellula rogatalis (Hulst, 1886)
- Herpetogramma bermudalis (Dyar, 1915)
- Herpetogramma bipunctalis (Fabricius, 1794)
- Herpetogramma phaeopteralis (Guenée, 1854)
- Hymenia perspectalis (Hübner, 1796)
- Nomophila nearctica Munroe, 1973
- Oenobotys invinacealis Ferguson, Hilburn & Wright, 1991
- Oenobotys vinotinctalis (Hampson, 1895)
- Palpita kimballi Munroe, 1959
- Penestola bufalis (Guenée, 1854)
- Pyrausta onythesalis (Walker, 1859)
- Rhectocraspeda periusalis (Walker, 1859)
- Scoparia jonesalis Dyar, 1915
- Spoladea recurvalis (Fabricius, 1775)
- Sufetula diminutalis (Walker, 1866)
- Syngamia florella (Stoll in Cramer & Stoll, 1781)
- Terastia meticulosalis Guenee, 1854
- Udea rubigalis (Guenée, 1854)
- Uresiphita reversalis (Guenée, 1854)

=== Elachistidae ===
- Elachista species

=== Gelechiidae ===
- Dichomeris acuminata (Staudinger, in Kalchberg, 1876)
- Keiferia lycopersicella (Walsingham, 1897)
- Phthorimaea operculella (Zeller, 1873)
- Polyhymno sp. probably luteostrigella Chambers, 1874
- Recurvaria annulicornis (Walsingham, 1897)
- Stegasta bosqueella (Chambers, 1875)
- Symmetrischema striatella (Murtfeldt, 1900)
- Taygete parvella (Fabricius, 1794)

=== Geometridae ===
- Costaconvexa centrostrigaria (Wollaston, 1858)
- Cyclophora myrtaria (Guenée, 1857)
- Disclisioprocta stellata (Guenée, [1858])
- Leptostales crossii (Hulst, 1900)
- Leptostales laevitaria (Geyer, 1837)
- Leptostales pannaria (Guenée, [1858])
- Macaria ochrifascia (Warren, 1897)
- Orthonama obstipata (Fabricius, 1794)
- Pleuroprucha asthenaria (Walker, 1861)
- Pleuroprucha insulsaria (Guenée, 1857)
- Synchlora frondaria Guenée, 1857

=== Gracillariidae ===
- Caloptilia perseae (Busck, 1920)
- Caloptilia rhoifoliella (Chambers, 1876)

=== Hyblaeidae ===
- Hyblaea puera (Cramer, 1777)

=== Lyonetiidae ===
- Bedellia somnulentella (Zeller, 1847)

=== Momphidae ===
- Mompha circumscriptella (Zeller, 1873)

=== Noctuidae ===
- Agrotis ipsilon (Hufnagel, 1766)
- Agrotis malefida Guenée, 1852
- Amyna axis (Guenée, 1852)
- Anicla infecta (Ochsenheimer, 1816)
- Anomis editrix (Guenée, 1852)
- Anomis erosa Hübner, 1821
- Anomis flava fimbriago (Stephens, 1829)
- Anticarsia gemmatalis Hübner, 1818
- Argyrogramma verruca (Fabricius, 1794)
- Ascalapha odorata (Linnaeus, 1758)
- Callopistria floridensis (Guenée, 1852)
- Chrysodeixis includens (Walker, 1858)
- Condica circuita (Guenée, 1852) (possible misidentification)
- Condica mobilis (Walker, 1857)
- Condica sutor (Guenée, 1852)
- Elaphria nucicolora (Guenee, 1852)
- Eumestleta recta (Guenée, 1852)
- Feltia subterranea (Fabricius, 1794)
- Galgula partita Guenée, 1852
- Garella nilotica (Rogenhofer, 1881)
- Helicoverpa zea (Boddie, 1850)
- Heliothis virescens (Fabricius, 1777)
- Hypena minualis (Guénée, 1854)
- Hypena scabra (Fabricius, 1798)
- Leucania subpunctata (Harvey, 1875)
- Litoprosopus futilis (Grote & Robinson, 1868)
- Megalographa biloba (Stephens, 1830)
- Melipotis acontioides (Guenée, 1852)
- Melipotis famelica (Guenée, 1852)
- Mocis disseverans (Walker, 1858)
- Mocis latipes (Guenée, 1852)
- Mocis marcida (Guenée, 1852)
- Mythimna unipuncta (Haworth, 1809)
- Peridroma saucia (Hübner, 1808)
- Rachiplusia ou (Guenée, 1852)
- Schrankia macula (Druce, 1891)
- Spodoptera dolichos (Fabricius, 1794)
- Spodoptera eridania (Stoll, 1782)
- Spodoptera exigua (Hübner, 1808)
- Spodoptera frugiperda (J.E. Smith, 1797)
- Spodoptera ornithogalli (Guenée, 1852)
- Tetanolita mynesalis inaequalis Ferguson, Hilburn & Wright, 1991
- Trichoplusia ni (Hübner, 1800-1803)
- Zale fictilis (Guenée, 1852)
- Zale lunata (Drury, 1773)

=== Plutellidae ===
- Plutella xylostella (Linnaeus, 1758)

=== Pterophoridae ===
- Emmelina monodactyla (Linnaeus, 1758)
- Lantanophaga pusillidactyla (Walker, 1864)
- Lioptilodes albistriolatus (Zeller, 1877)
- Oidaematophorus lienigianus (Zeller, 1852)
- Stenoptilodes brevipennis (Zeller, 1874)

=== Pyralidae ===
- Achroia grisella (Fabricius, 1794)
- Anagasta kuehniella (Zeller, 1879)
- Atheloca subrufella (Hulst, 1887)
- Cadra cautella (Walker, 1863)
- Cassiana malacella Dyar, 1914
- Cryptoblabes gnidiella (Millière, 1867)
- Elasmopalpus lignosellus Zeller, 1848
- Ephestiodes indentella (Dyar, 1915)
- Fundella ignobilis Heinrich, 1945
- Galleria mellonella (Linnaeus, 1758)
- Hypargyria definitella (Zeller, 1881)
- Ocrasa nostralis (Guenée, 1854)
- Plodia interpunctella (Hübner, [1813])
- Pyralis farinalis (Linnaeus, 1758)
- Pyralis manihotalis Guenee, 1854

=== Sphingidae ===
- Agrius cingulata (Fabricius, 1775)
- Erinnyis ello (Linnaeus, 1758)
- Manduca sexta (Linnaeus, 1763)
- Pseudosphinx tetrio (Linnaeus, 1771)
- Xylophanes tersa (Linnaeus, 1771)

=== Tineidae ===
- Erechthias minuscula (Walsingham, 1897)
- Lepyrotica scardamyctis Meyrick, 1921
- Nemapogon granella (Linnaeus, 1758)
- Niditinea fuscella (Linnaeus, 1758)
- Niditinea praeumbrata (Meyrick, 1919)
- Oenoe euphrantis Meyrick, 1927
- Opogona sacchari Bojer, 1856
- Pompostolella charipepla (Meyrick, 1927)
- Praeacedes atomosella (Walker, 1863)
- Protodarcia haliplancta (Meyrick, 1927)
- Setomorpha rutella Zeller, 1852
- Tinea minutella Fabricius, 1794
- Tinea pellionella (Linnaeus, 1758)
- Tineola bisselliella (Hummel, 1823)
- Xystrologa antipathetica (Forbes, 1931)
- A Monopis species

=== Tortricidae ===
- Aethes seriatana (Zeller, 1875)
- Argyrotaenia velutinana (Walker, 1863)
- Bactra verutana Zeller, 1875
- Coniostola procellosa (Meyrick, 1917)
- Crocidosema lantana Busck, 1910
- Crocidosema plebejana Zeller, 1847
- Endothenia hebesana (Walker, 1863)
- Epiblema strenuana (Walker, 1863)
- Episimus argutanus (Clemens, 1860)
- Episimus tyrius Heinrich, 1923
- Episimus species
- Grapholitini species
- Sparganothis sulfureana (Clemens, 1860)
- Strepsicrates smithiana Walsingham, 1892

=== Yponomeutidae ===
- Yponomeuta calcarata Meyrick, 1924
