= E. utilis =

E. utilis may refer to:

- Ecdysanthera utilis, a shrub species now known as Urceola micrantha
- Episimus utilis, a moth species native to Brazil

== See also ==
- Utilis (disambiguation)
