= Diacme griseicincta =

Scientific classification
- Kingdom: Animalia
- Phylum: Arthropoda
- Clade: Pancrustacea
- Class: Insecta
- Order: Lepidoptera
- Family: Crambidae
- Genus: Diacme
- Species: D. griseicincta

Binomial name
- Diacme griseicincta (Hampson, 1913)

Synonyms
- Sameodes griseicincta Hampson, 1913; Sciorista oriolalis Druce, 1895

Species of moth

Diacme griseicincta is a moth in the family Crambidae. It was described by George Hampson in 1913. It is found in Colombia.
