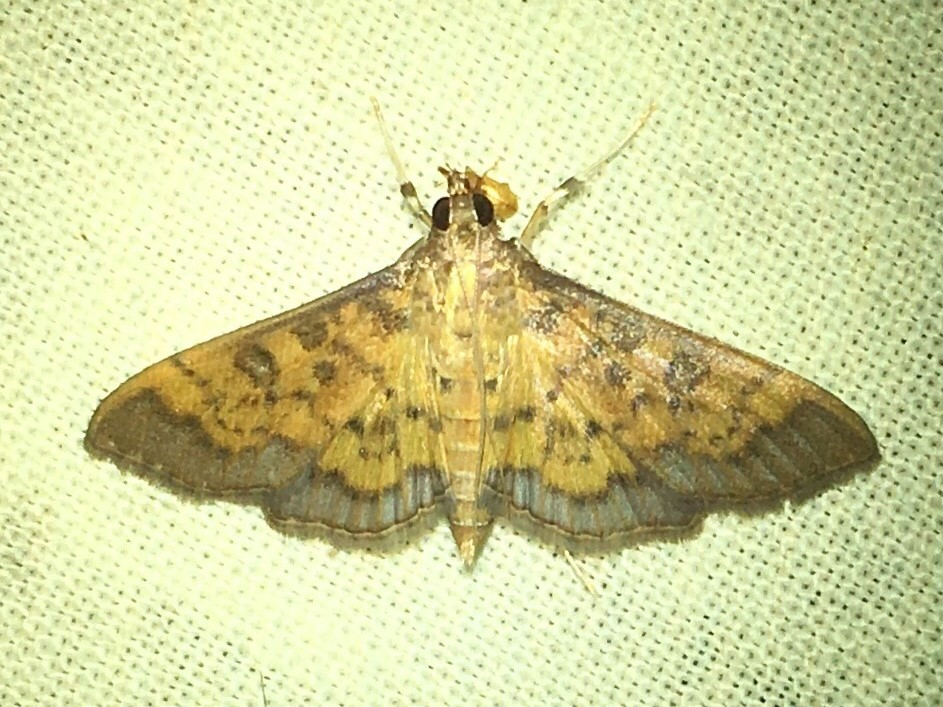

Scientific classification
- Kingdom: Animalia
- Phylum: Arthropoda
- Clade: Pancrustacea
- Class: Insecta
- Order: Lepidoptera
- Family: Crambidae
- Genus: Diacme
- Species: D. phyllisalis

Binomial name
- Diacme phyllisalis (Walker, 1859)

Synonyms
- Samea phyllisalis Walker, 1859; Botys aulicalis Möschler, 1886

= Diacme phyllisalis =

Species of moth

Diacme phyllisalis is a species of moth in the family Crambidae. It was first described by Francis Walker in 1859. It is found in Jamaica, Cuba and Mexico, as well the south-eastern United States, where it has been recorded from Florida and Georgia.
