= Taygete lasciva =

Scientific classification
- Domain: Eukaryota
- Kingdom: Animalia
- Phylum: Arthropoda
- Class: Insecta
- Order: Lepidoptera
- Family: Autostichidae
- Genus: Taygete
- Species: T. lasciva

Binomial name
- Taygete lasciva (Walsingham, 1910)

Synonyms
- Epithectis lasciva Walsingham, 1910

Species of moth

Taygete lasciva is a moth in the family Autostichidae. It was described by Thomas de Grey, 6th Baron Walsingham, in 1910. It is found in Panama.

The wingspan is about 8.5 mm. The forewings are pale ochreous, with some streaky shades of darker brownish ochreous above and below the fold, along the cell, and beyond it. A short black streak, at the base, reaches nearly to the nexus, but does not actually touch the margin, and is followed by three, elongate, black costal spots, gradually increasing in size. The first near the base, the second before the middle, the third, and most conspicuous, beyond the middle. Below each of the two latter are a few black dots, and beyond the last is a series of small marginal black spots running around the apex and termen. The hindwings are pale grey.
