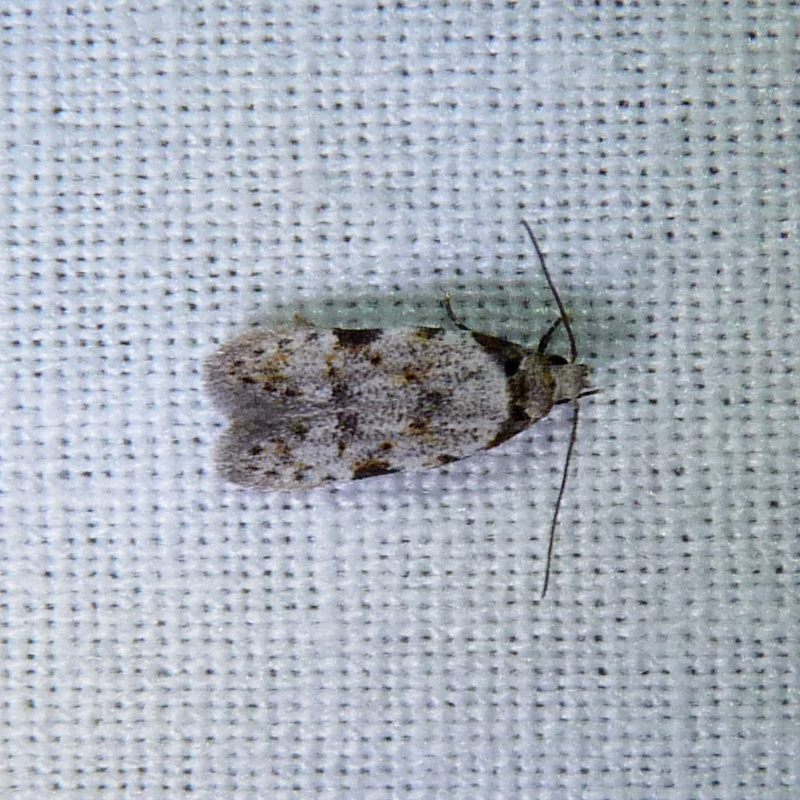
- Taygete attributella

Scientific classification
- Kingdom: Animalia
- Phylum: Arthropoda
- Clade: Pancrustacea
- Class: Insecta
- Order: Lepidoptera
- Family: Autostichidae
- Subfamily: Symmocinae
- Genus: Taygete; Chambers, 1873

= Taygete (moth) =

Genus of moths

Taygete is a genus of moths in the family Autostichidae.

== Species ==
- Taygete altivola (Meyrick, 1929)
- Taygete attributella (Walker, 1864)
- Taygete balsamopa (Meyrick, 1923)
- Taygete barydelta (Meyrick, 1923)
- Taygete citranthes (Meyrick, 1923)
- Taygete citrinella (Barnes & Busck, 1920)
- Taygete consociata (Meyrick, 1914)
- Taygete critica (Walsingham, 1910)
- Taygete decemmaculella (Chambers, 1875)
- Taygete gallaegenitella (Clemens, 1864)
- Taygete ignavella (Zeller, 1877)
- Taygete lasciva (Walsingham, 1910)
- Taygete notospila (Meyrick, 1923)
- Taygete parvella (Fabricius, 1794)
- Taygete platysoma (Walsingham, 1910)
- Taygete saundersella (Chambers, 1876)
- Taygete sphecophila (Meyrick, 1936)
- Taygete sylvicolella (Busck, 1903)
