= Taygete sylvicolella =

Scientific classification
- Domain: Eukaryota
- Kingdom: Animalia
- Phylum: Arthropoda
- Class: Insecta
- Order: Lepidoptera
- Family: Autostichidae
- Genus: Taygete
- Species: T. sylvicolella

Binomial name
- Taygete sylvicolella (Busck, 1903)

Synonyms
- Epithectis sylvicolella Busck, 1903

Species of moth

Taygete sylvicolella is a moth in the family Autostichidae. It was described by August Busck in 1903. It is found in North America, where it has been recorded from Illinois, Maine, New York, Ohio and South Carolina.

The wingspan is about 15 mm. The forewings are white, thickly overlaid with dark fuscous. There are three brown, nearly black costal spots, one at the base, one just before the costal cilia, and one midway between these. At the beginning of costal cilia is a whitish spot less overlaid with fuscous than the rest of the wing, and opposite on the dorsal margin is a similar but smaller spot. At basal third of the dorsal margin is a short, transverse, oblique dark streak reaching the fold, on which it widens out to a small dark spot, sometimes more prominent than the streak and edged exteriorly with a few white scales. On the middle of the disk is a blackish oblong dot edged with white, and at the end of the disk is a similar rather more prominent dot. Between and immediately below these dots is an oblong, longitudinal, dark-brown streak. At base of cilia, around the costal, apical and dorsal edge, is a row of equidistant dark-brown spots. The hindwings are light grey, with bluish reflections.
