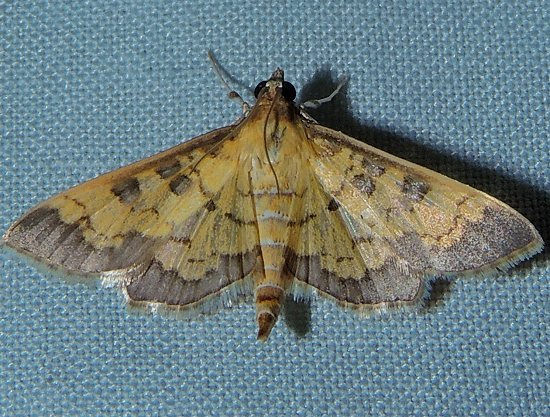
- Diacme elealis

Scientific classification
- Kingdom: Animalia
- Phylum: Arthropoda
- Class: Insecta
- Order: Lepidoptera
- Family: Crambidae
- Subfamily: Spilomelinae
- Genus: Diacme; Warren, 1892

= Diacme =

Genus of moths

Diacme is a genus of moths of the family Crambidae.

== Species ==
- Diacme adipaloides (Grote & Robinson, 1867)
- Diacme claudialis
- Diacme elealis (Walker, 1859)
- Diacme finitalis (Guenée, 1854)
- Diacme griseicincta (Hampson, 1913)
- Diacme liparalis (Guenée, 1854)
- Diacme mopsalis (Walker, 1859)
- Diacme oriolalis (Guenée, 1854)
- Diacme phyllisalis (Walker, 1859)
- Diacme samealis (Snellen, 1875)
