= Oenobotys pantoppidani =

Scientific classification
- Domain: Eukaryota
- Kingdom: Animalia
- Phylum: Arthropoda
- Class: Insecta
- Order: Lepidoptera
- Family: Crambidae
- Genus: Oenobotys
- Species: O. pantoppidani

Binomial name
- Oenobotys pantoppidani (Hedemann, 1894)

Synonyms
- Botys pantoppidani Hedemann, 1894; Botys pontoppidani; Phlyctaenia desistalis McDunnough, 1939

Species of moth

Oenobotys pantoppidani is a moth in the family Crambidae. It was described by W. von Hedemann in 1894. It is found on the Virgin Islands.
