= Taygete critica =

Scientific classification
- Domain: Eukaryota
- Kingdom: Animalia
- Phylum: Arthropoda
- Class: Insecta
- Order: Lepidoptera
- Family: Autostichidae
- Genus: Taygete
- Species: T. critica

Binomial name
- Taygete critica (Walsingham, 1910)

Synonyms
- Epithectis critica Walsingham, 1910

Species of moth

Taygete critica is a moth in the family Autostichidae. It was described by Thomas de Grey, 6th Baron Walsingham, in 1910. It is found in Mexico (Guerrero).

The wingspan is about 9 mm. The forewings are creamy ochreous, becoming more ochreous towards the apex, the costa blackish from the base to beyond the middle and profusely dusted with black towards the apex. A black dusted patch crosses the fold beyond its middle, not reaching the dorsum, and beyond this the apical portion of the wing is profusely dusted with black intermixed with whitish scales along the lines of the nervules. The hindwings are pale grey.
