= Taygete ignavella =

Scientific classification
- Kingdom: Animalia
- Phylum: Arthropoda
- Clade: Pancrustacea
- Class: Insecta
- Order: Lepidoptera
- Family: Autostichidae
- Genus: Taygete
- Species: T. ignavella

Binomial name
- Taygete ignavella (Zeller, 1877)

Synonyms
- Gelechia (Euteles) ignavella Zeller, 1877

Species of moth

Taygete ignavella is a moth in the family Autostichidae. It was described by Philipp Christoph Zeller in 1877. It is found in Colombia.
