= Taygete saundersella =

Scientific classification
- Kingdom: Animalia
- Phylum: Arthropoda
- Clade: Pancrustacea
- Class: Insecta
- Order: Lepidoptera
- Family: Autostichidae
- Genus: Taygete
- Species: T. saundersella

Binomial name
- Taygete saundersella (Chambers, 1876)

Synonyms
- Gelechia saundersella Chambers, 1876

Species of moth

Taygete saundersella is a moth in the family Autostichidae. It was described by Vactor Tousey Chambers in 1876. It is found in North America, where it has been recorded from Kentucky.

The forewings are pale creamy yellow densely dusted with blackish scales beneath the fold. There is a blackish spot on the base of the costal margin, another about the basal fourth on the costal margin, which is not distinctly separated from one placed obliquely behind which touches the fold. There is another on the costal margin just behind the middle, behind and beneath which is another just above the end of the fold, and the apical part of the wing very densely dusted with blackish. The hindwings are rather deeply emarginate beneath the tip and pale slate color.
