= Oenobotys texanalis =

Scientific classification
- Domain: Eukaryota
- Kingdom: Animalia
- Phylum: Arthropoda
- Class: Insecta
- Order: Lepidoptera
- Family: Crambidae
- Genus: Oenobotys
- Species: O. texanalis

Binomial name
- Oenobotys texanalis Munroe, E. & A. Blanchard in Munroe, 1976

Species of moth

Oenobotys texanalis is a moth in the family Crambidae. It was described by Eugene G. Munroe, E. Blanchard and A. Blanchard in 1976. It is found in North America, where it has been recorded from Texas.
