= Taygete gallaegenitella =

Scientific classification
- Kingdom: Animalia
- Phylum: Arthropoda
- Clade: Pancrustacea
- Class: Insecta
- Order: Lepidoptera
- Family: Autostichidae
- Genus: Taygete
- Species: T. gallaegenitella

Binomial name
- Taygete gallaegenitella (Clemens, 1864)

Synonyms
- Gelechia gallaegenitella Clemens, 1864; Gelechia geminella Riley, 1871

Species of moth

Taygete gallaegenitella is a moth in the family Autostichidae. It was described by James Brackenridge Clemens in 1864. It is found in the United States, where it has been recorded from New York to Florida and to Texas.

The forewings are white, but so freely dusted with black as almost to obscure the ground color, especially between the bands. There are three oblique, black bands not distinctly marked, the first within the basal third of the wing, the second near the middle, the third, which is less distinct than the others placed about the apical third of the wing. The hindwings are pale gray.

Larvae have been recorded on oak galls.
