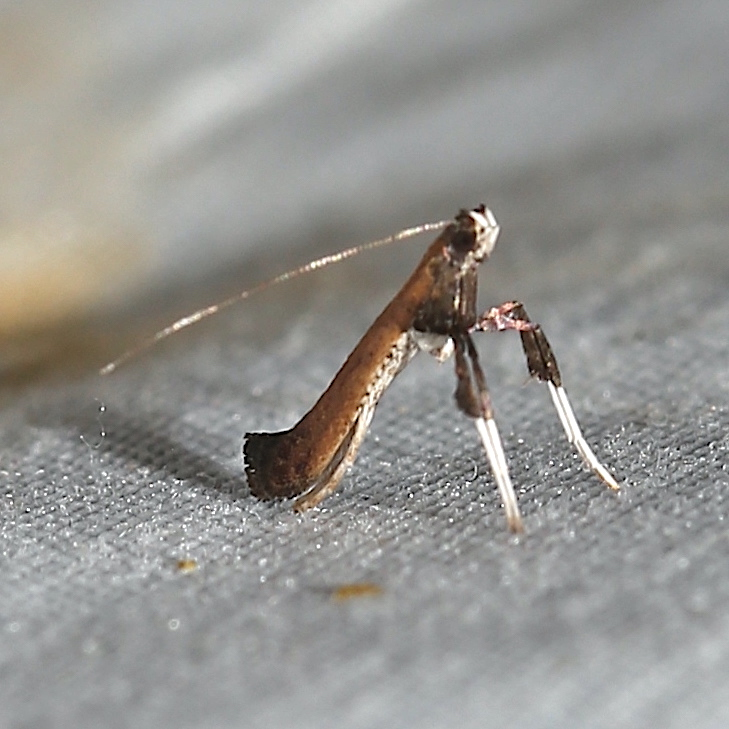

Scientific classification
- Kingdom: Animalia
- Phylum: Arthropoda
- Clade: Pancrustacea
- Class: Insecta
- Order: Lepidoptera
- Family: Gracillariidae
- Genus: Caloptilia
- Species: C. rhoifoliella

Binomial name
- Caloptilia rhoifoliella (Chambers, 1876)

Synonyms
- Gracillaria rhoifoliella Chambers, 1876

= Caloptilia rhoifoliella =

Sumac leafblotch miner

Species of moth

Caloptilia rhoifoliella (sumac leafblotch miner) is a moth of the family Gracillariidae. It is known from Bermuda, Canada (including Manitoba, Québec and Ontario), and the United States (including Mississippi, New York, Kentucky, California, Florida, Georgia, Maine, Maryland, Michigan, Minnesota, Missouri, New Jersey, Texas, Vermont, North Carolina, Illinois, Kansas and Louisiana).

The wingspan is about 13 mm. Adults are on wing in September, November, March and April in Florida and in May in Texas.

The larvae feed on Rhus species (including Rhus copallina, Rhus lanceolata, Rhus toxicodendron and Rhus typhina), Schinus terebinthifolia, Toxicodendron pubescens and Toxicodendron radicans. They mine the leaves of their host plant.
