= Taygete barydelta =

Scientific classification
- Kingdom: Animalia
- Phylum: Arthropoda
- Class: Insecta
- Order: Lepidoptera
- Family: Autostichidae
- Genus: Taygete
- Species: T. barydelta

Binomial name
- Taygete barydelta (Meyrick, 1923)

Synonyms
- Epithectis barydelta Meyrick, 1923

Species of moth

Taygete barydelta is a moth in the family Autostichidae. It was described by Edward Meyrick in 1923. It is found in Pará, Brazil.

The wingspan is about 7 mm. The forewings are yellow whitish, scattered with black scales and with large blackish flattened-triangular spots on the costa near the base and at one-third and three-fifths, smaller blackish spots on the dorsum opposite the two posterior. There is also a triangular blackish apical spot. The hindwings are grey.
