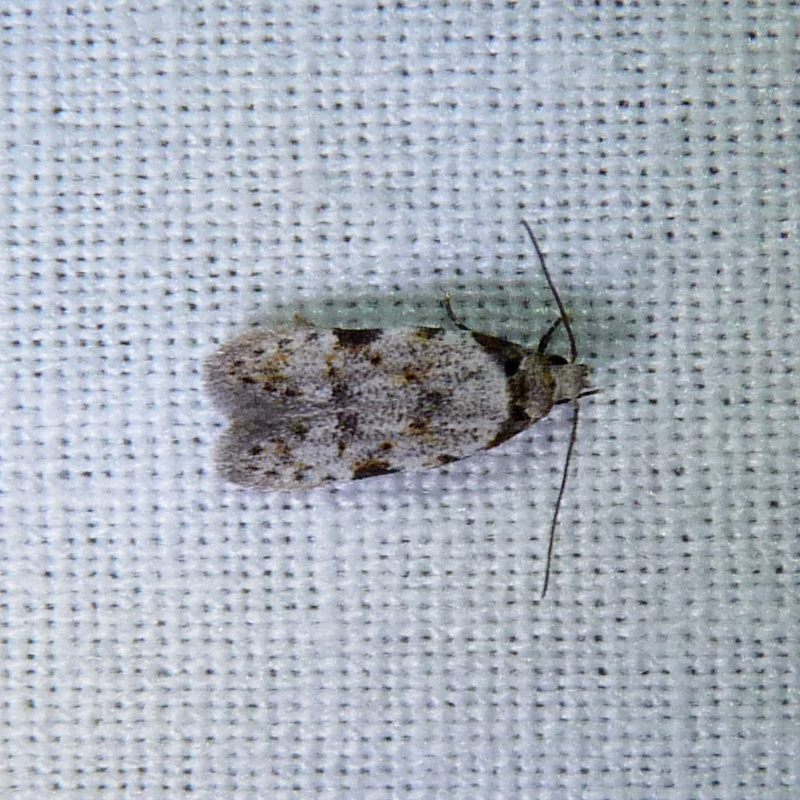

Scientific classification
- Kingdom: Animalia
- Phylum: Arthropoda
- Class: Insecta
- Order: Lepidoptera
- Family: Autostichidae
- Genus: Taygete
- Species: T. attributella

Binomial name
- Taygete attributella (Walker, 1864)

Synonyms
- Gelechia attributella Walker, 1864; Evagora difficilisella Chambers, 1872

= Taygete attributella =

Species of moth

Taygete attributella is a moth of the family Autostichidae. It is found in North America, including Illinois, Massachusetts, Minnesota, New Jersey, New York, Pennsylvania and Virginia.
