= Diacme finitalis =

Scientific classification
- Kingdom: Animalia
- Phylum: Arthropoda
- Clade: Pancrustacea
- Class: Insecta
- Order: Lepidoptera
- Family: Crambidae
- Genus: Diacme
- Species: D. finitalis

Binomial name
- Diacme finitalis (Guenée, 1854)

Synonyms
- Botys finitalis Guenée, 1854

Species of moth

Diacme finitalis is a moth in the family Crambidae. It was described by Achille Guenée in 1854. It is found in Brazil.
