= Diacme samealis =

Scientific classification
- Kingdom: Animalia
- Phylum: Arthropoda
- Clade: Pancrustacea
- Class: Insecta
- Order: Lepidoptera
- Family: Crambidae
- Genus: Diacme
- Species: D. samealis

Binomial name
- Diacme samealis (Snellen, 1875)

Synonyms
- Botys oriolalis Snellen, 1875

Species of moth

Diacme samealis is a moth in the family Crambidae. It was described by Snellen in 1875. It is found in Colombia.
