= Taygete platysoma =

Scientific classification
- Domain: Eukaryota
- Kingdom: Animalia
- Phylum: Arthropoda
- Class: Insecta
- Order: Lepidoptera
- Family: Autostichidae
- Genus: Taygete
- Species: T. platysoma

Binomial name
- Taygete platysoma (Walsingham, 1910)

Synonyms
- Epithectis platysoma Walsingham, 1910

Species of moth

Taygete platysoma is a moth in the family Autostichidae. It was described by Thomas de Grey, 6th Baron Walsingham, in 1910. It is found in Mexico (Durango, Veracruz).

The wingspan is 18–21 mm. The forewings are pale fawn-ochreous, with a short dull brown basal patch and a slightly oblique dark brown half-fascia at one-third from the costa to the fold, somewhat interrupted below its broad costal extremity. A shorter semi-fasciaform blotch of the same colour beyond the middle, not reaching to the fold in some specimens, but continued posteriorly to the dorsum in others the apex and termen being also clouded with dull brown. The hindwings are pale cinereous, with a slight ochreous tinge.
