= Episimus silvaticus =

Scientific classification
- Domain: Eukaryota
- Kingdom: Animalia
- Phylum: Arthropoda
- Class: Insecta
- Order: Lepidoptera
- Family: Tortricidae
- Genus: Episimus
- Species: E. silvaticus

Binomial name
- Episimus silvaticus Razowski & Wojtusiak, 2008

Species of moth

Episimus silvaticus is a species of moth of the family Tortricidae. It is found in Carchi Province, Ecuador.

The wingspan is about 18 mm.
