= Taygete balsamopa =

Scientific classification
- Kingdom: Animalia
- Phylum: Arthropoda
- Class: Insecta
- Order: Lepidoptera
- Family: Autostichidae
- Genus: Taygete
- Species: T. balsamopa

Binomial name
- Taygete balsamopa (Meyrick, 1923)

Synonyms
- Epithectis balsamopa Meyrick, 1923

Species of moth

Taygete balsamopa is a moth in the family Autostichidae. It was described by Edward Meyrick in 1923. It is found in Amazonas, Brazil.

The wingspan is 7–8 mm. The forewings are whitish yellow with scattered black specks and moderate semi-oval black spots on the costa at the base, one-third and three-fifths. There are small ochreous-orange spots edged with a few black specks representing the stigmata, the plical very obliquely before the first discal. A small grey spot sprinkled with black is found on the tornus, and two others on the termen. The hindwings are grey.
