= Diacme claudialis =

Scientific classification
- Kingdom: Animalia
- Phylum: Arthropoda
- Clade: Pancrustacea
- Class: Insecta
- Order: Lepidoptera
- Family: Crambidae
- Genus: Diacme
- Species: D. claudialis

Binomial name
- Diacme claudialis (Snellen, 1875)

Synonyms
- Botys claudialis Snellen, 1875

Species of moth

Diacme claudialis is a moth in the family Crambidae. It is found in Colombia.
