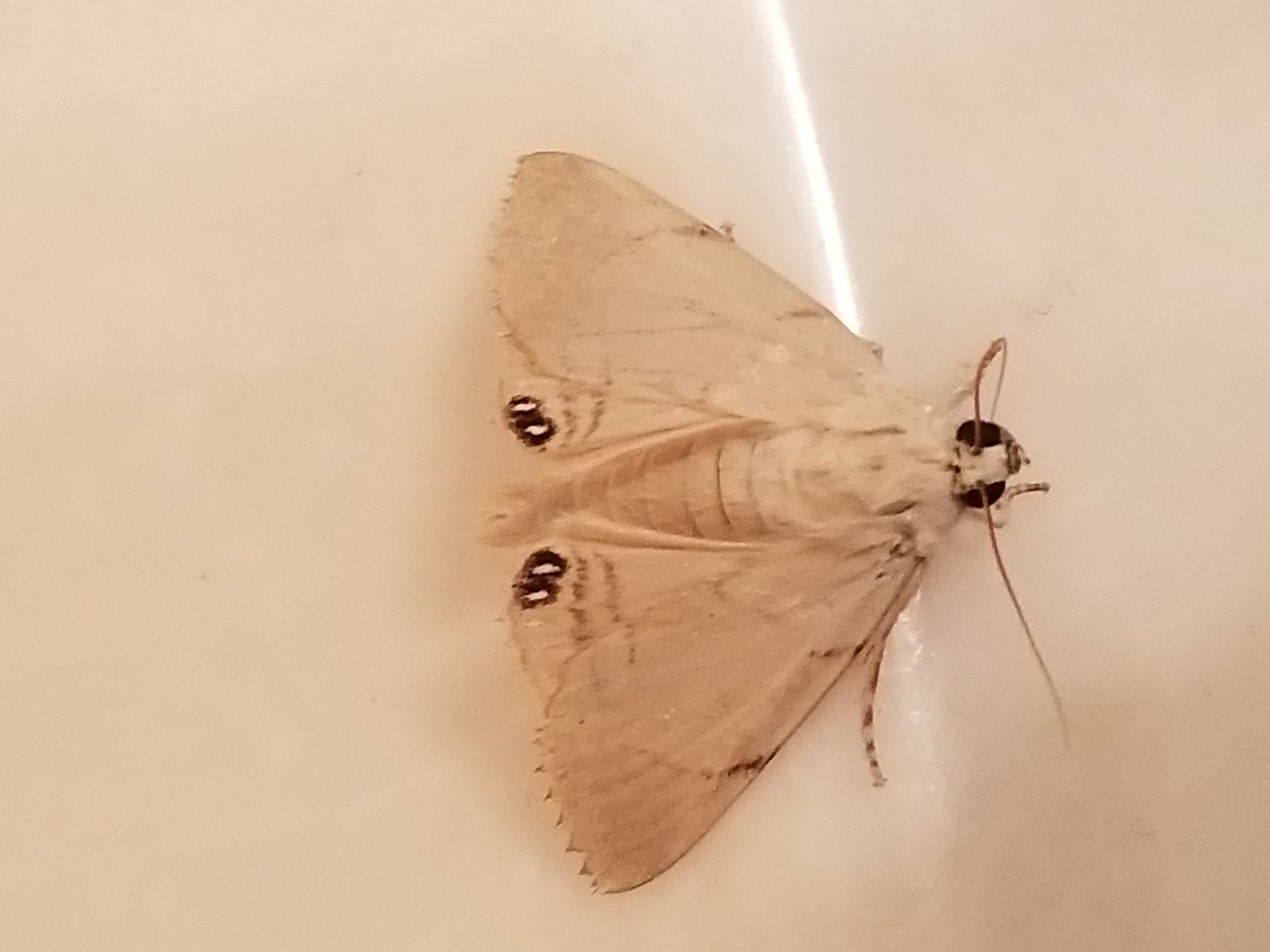

Scientific classification
- Kingdom: Animalia
- Phylum: Arthropoda
- Clade: Pancrustacea
- Class: Insecta
- Order: Lepidoptera
- Superfamily: Noctuoidea
- Family: Noctuidae
- Genus: Litoprosopus
- Species: L. coachella

Binomial name
- Litoprosopus coachella Hill, 1921

= Litoprosopus coachella =

Species of moth

Litoprosopus coachella, the palm flower moth, is a species of moth in the family Noctuidae (the owlet moths). It is found in North America.
