= Episimus brunneomarginatus =

Scientific classification
- Domain: Eukaryota
- Kingdom: Animalia
- Phylum: Arthropoda
- Class: Insecta
- Order: Lepidoptera
- Family: Tortricidae
- Genus: Episimus
- Species: E. brunneomarginatus

Binomial name
- Episimus brunneomarginatus (Razowski & Wojtusiak, 2006)

Synonyms
- Epinotia brunneomarginata Razowski & Wojtusiak, 2006; Episimus brunneomarginata

Species of moth

Episimus brunneomarginatus is a species of moth of the family Tortricidae. It is found in Ecuador (Morona-Santiago Province and Napo Province).

The wingspan is about 24 millimetres (0.94 in).
