= Taygete notospila =

Scientific classification
- Kingdom: Animalia
- Phylum: Arthropoda
- Class: Insecta
- Order: Lepidoptera
- Family: Autostichidae
- Genus: Taygete
- Species: T. notospila

Binomial name
- Taygete notospila (Meyrick, 1923)

Synonyms
- Epithectis notospila Meyrick, 1923

Species of moth

Taygete notospila is a moth in the family Autostichidae. It was described by Edward Meyrick in 1923. It is found in Amazonas, Brazil.

The wingspan is about 8 mm (0.31 in). The forewings are pale whitish yellow irregularly sprinkled with dark fuscous. The markings are fuscous edged with dark fuscous sprinkles. There is a short slender oblique streak from the base of the costa and a mark at one-third, as well as an irregular blotch from the dorsum before the middle reaching more than halfway across the wing. A large spot is found on the costa at two-thirds and there is a triangular spot on the tornus opposite nearly meeting or sometimes connected with it. Two smaller triangular spots are found on the termen. The hindwings are dark grey.
