= Oenobotys glirialis =

Scientific classification
- Kingdom: Animalia
- Phylum: Arthropoda
- Class: Insecta
- Order: Lepidoptera
- Family: Crambidae
- Genus: Oenobotys
- Species: O. glirialis

Binomial name
- Oenobotys glirialis (Herrich-Schäffer, 1871)

Synonyms
- Botys glirialis Herrich-Schäffer, 1871

Species of moth

Oenobotys glirialis is a moth in the family Crambidae. It was described by Gottlieb August Wilhelm Herrich-Schäffer in 1871. It is found in Cuba.
