= Taygete citrinella =

Scientific classification
- Domain: Eukaryota
- Kingdom: Animalia
- Phylum: Arthropoda
- Class: Insecta
- Order: Lepidoptera
- Family: Autostichidae
- Genus: Taygete
- Species: T. citrinella

Binomial name
- Taygete citrinella (Barnes & Busck, 1920)

Synonyms
- Epithectia citrinella Barnes & Busck, 1920

Species of moth

Taygete citrinella is a moth in the family Autostichidae. It was described by William Barnes and August Busck in 1920. It is found in North America, where it has been recorded from Arizona and California.

The wingspan is 8–10 mm. The forewings are light lemon yellow with the base of the costal edge black. There is a black costal spot at the basal fourth and another just beyond the middle. A small black spot is found on the dorsal edge at the end of the fold and there are three small black dots along the terminal edge. The hindwings are light silvery fuscous.
