= Diacme mopsalis =

Mopsalis diacme moth

Scientific classification
- Kingdom: Animalia
- Phylum: Arthropoda
- Clade: Pancrustacea
- Class: Insecta
- Order: Lepidoptera
- Family: Crambidae
- Genus: Diacme
- Species: D. mopsalis

Binomial name
- Diacme mopsalis (Walker, 1859)

Synonyms
- Botys mopsalis Walker, 1859; Botys mettiusalis Walker, 1859; Botys togalis Lederer, 1863; Paratalanta griseicinctalis Hampson, 1913; Diacme griseicinctus Kimball, 1965

Species of moth

Diacme mopsalis, the mopsalis diacme moth, is a moth in the family Crambidae. It was described by Francis Walker in 1859. It is found in South America (including Venezuela), Central America, the Antilles (including Cuba, Jamaica, the Bahamas) and the southern United States, where it has been recorded from Arizona, Florida, Oklahoma and Texas.

Adults have been recorded year round in Florida.
