= Taygete altivola =

Scientific classification
- Domain: Eukaryota
- Kingdom: Animalia
- Phylum: Arthropoda
- Class: Insecta
- Order: Lepidoptera
- Family: Autostichidae
- Genus: Taygete
- Species: T. altivola

Binomial name
- Taygete altivola (Meyrick, 1929)

Synonyms
- Epithectis altivola Meyrick, 1929

Species of moth

Taygete altivola is a moth in the family Autostichidae. It was described by Edward Meyrick in 1929. It is found in Peru.
