= Taygete decemmaculella =

Scientific classification
- Kingdom: Animalia
- Phylum: Arthropoda
- Clade: Pancrustacea
- Class: Insecta
- Order: Lepidoptera
- Family: Autostichidae
- Genus: Taygete
- Species: T. decemmaculella

Binomial name
- Taygete decemmaculella (Chambers, 1875)

Synonyms
- Gelechia decemmaculella Chambers, 1875; Gelechia bicostomaculella Chambers, 1877; Oecophora thoracella Walsingham, 1888; Epithectis osteosema Meyrick, 1929

Species of moth

Taygete decemmaculella is a moth in the family Autostichidae. It was described by Vactor Tousey Chambers in 1875. It is found in North America, where it has been recorded from Arizona, Colorado, Maine, Montana, New Mexico, Oklahoma, Utah and Wyoming.

The wingspan is 15–17 mm.
