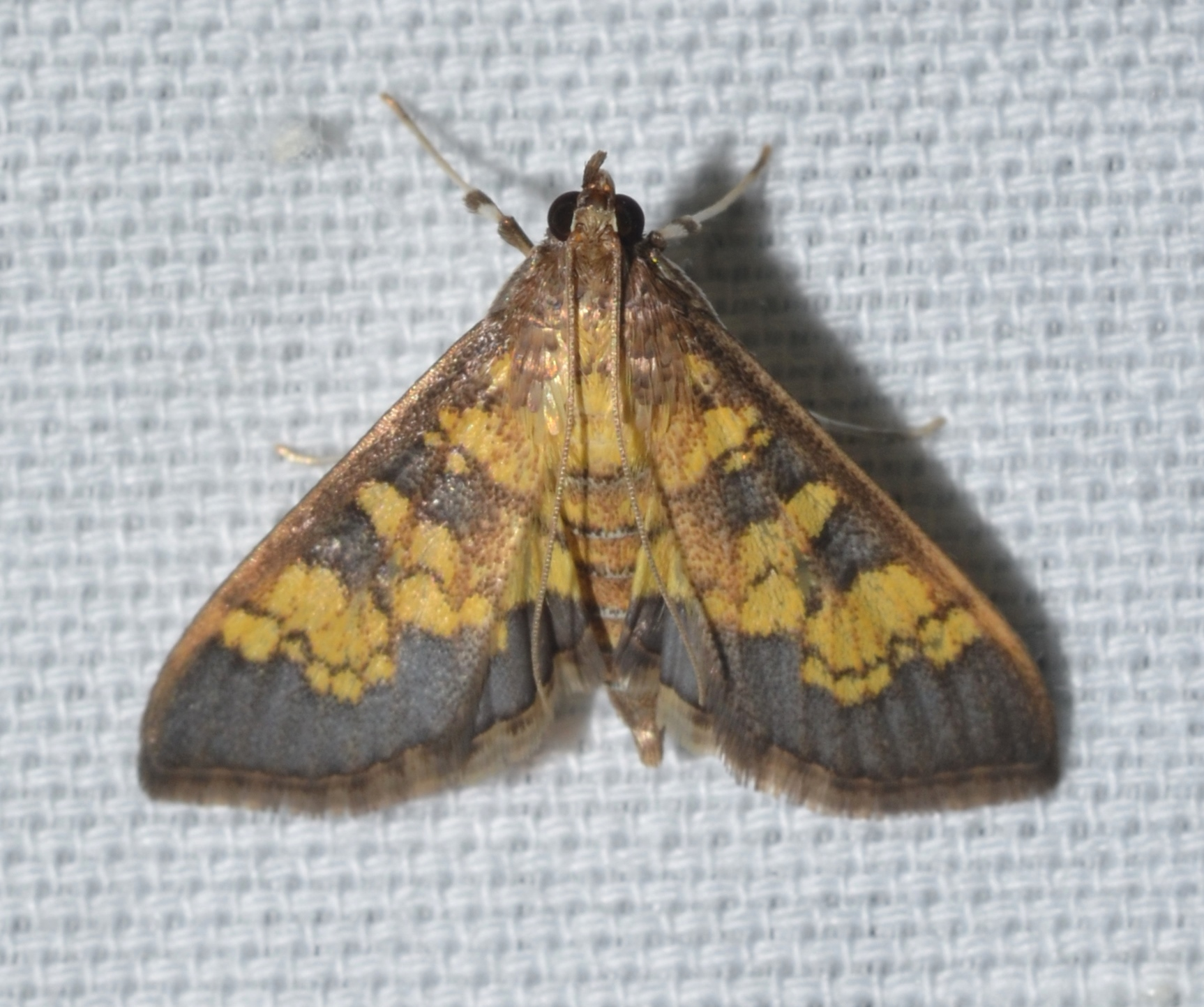

Scientific classification
- Kingdom: Animalia
- Phylum: Arthropoda
- Clade: Pancrustacea
- Class: Insecta
- Order: Lepidoptera
- Family: Crambidae
- Genus: Diacme
- Species: D. adipaloides

Binomial name
- Diacme adipaloides (Grote & Robinson, 1867)

Synonyms
- Botys adipaloides Grote & Robinson, 1867

= Diacme adipaloides =

Darker diacme moth

Species of moth

Diacme adipaloides, the darker diacme moth, is a moth in the family Crambidae. It was described by Augustus Radcliffe Grote and Coleman Townsend Robinson in 1867. It is found in North America, where it has been recorded from Alabama, Arkansas, Florida, Indiana, Maine, Maryland, Massachusetts, Michigan, Minnesota, New Brunswick, New Hampshire, New Jersey, New York, North Carolina, Nova Scotia, Ohio, Oklahoma, Ontario, Quebec, South Carolina, Tennessee, Texas, Virginia, West Virginia and Wisconsin. Adults have been recorded year round.
