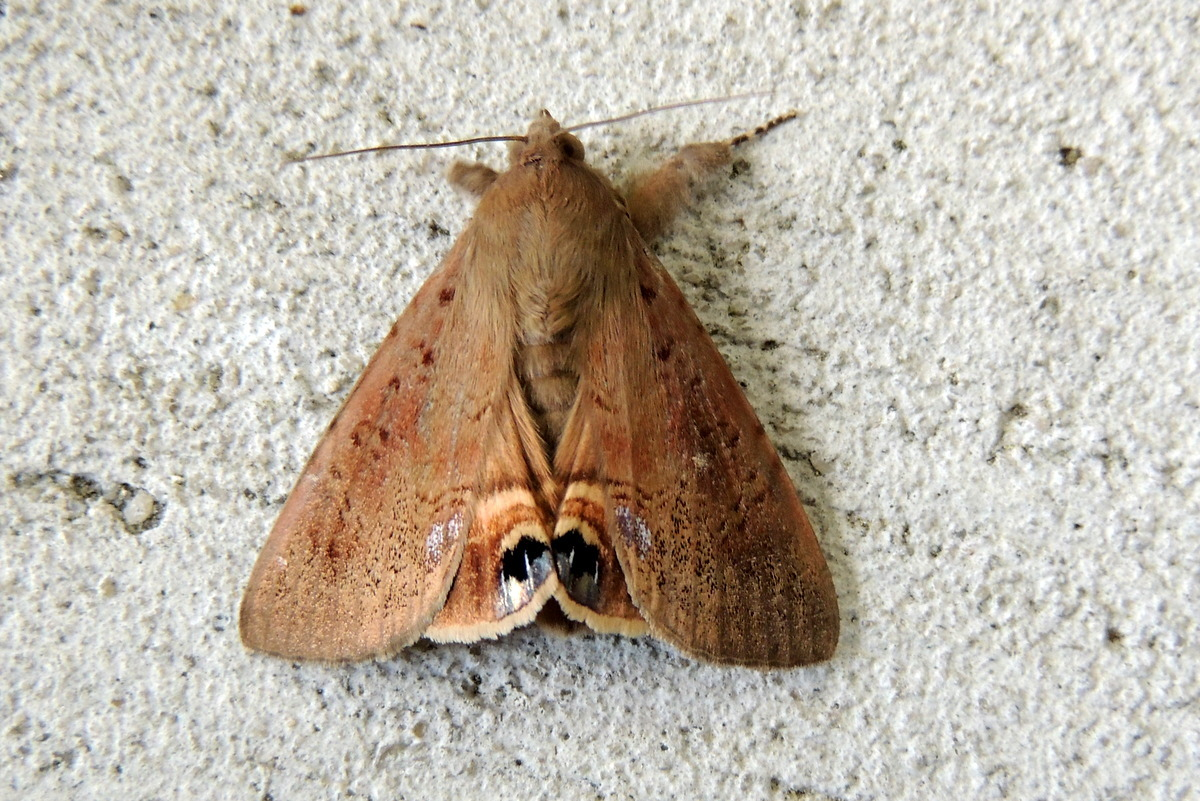
- Litoprosopus futilis

Scientific classification
- Kingdom: Animalia
- Phylum: Arthropoda
- Clade: Pancrustacea
- Class: Insecta
- Order: Lepidoptera
- Superfamily: Noctuoidea
- Family: Noctuidae
- Subfamily: Dyopsinae
- Genus: Litoprosopus; Grote, 1869

= Litoprosopus =

Genus of moths

Litoprosopus is a genus of moths in the subfamily Dyopsinae of the family Erebidae.

== Species ==
- Litoprosopus bahamensis Hampson, 1926
- Litoprosopus coachella Hill, 1921
- Litoprosopus confligens Walker, 1857
- Litoprosopus futilis Grote & Robinson, 1868
- Litoprosopus haitiensis Hampson, 1926
- Litoprosopus hatuey (Poey, 1832)
- Litoprosopus puncticosta Hampson, 1926
