= Taygete citranthes =

Scientific classification
- Domain: Eukaryota
- Kingdom: Animalia
- Phylum: Arthropoda
- Class: Insecta
- Order: Lepidoptera
- Family: Autostichidae
- Genus: Taygete
- Species: T. citranthes

Binomial name
- Taygete citranthes (Meyrick, 1923)

Synonyms
- Epithectis citranthes Meyrick, 1923

Species of moth

Taygete citranthes is a moth in the family Autostichidae. It was described by Edward Meyrick in 1923. It is found in Pará, Brazil.

The wingspan is 7–8 mm. The forewings are pale yellow, with a few scattered blackish and fulvous scales. There are small blackish spots on the costa at the base, one-third and three-fifths. There are indistinct dots of blackish sprinkles indicating the stigmata, the plical very obliquely before the first discal, sometimes some undefined and variably indicated slight fulvous streaks in the disc and an irregular black marginal line around the apex. The hindwings are dark grey.
