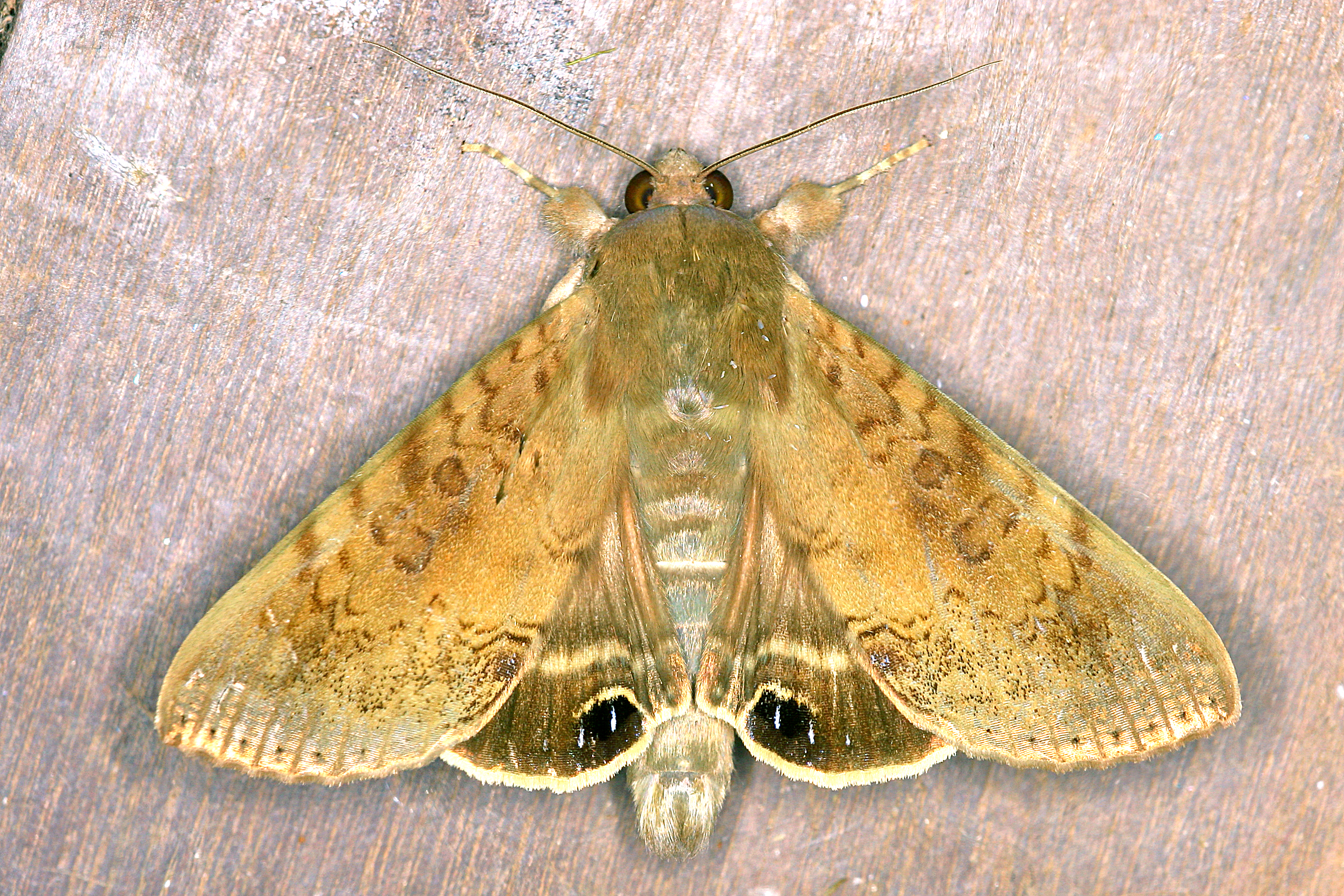

Scientific classification
- Kingdom: Animalia
- Phylum: Arthropoda
- Clade: Pancrustacea
- Class: Insecta
- Order: Lepidoptera
- Superfamily: Noctuoidea
- Family: Noctuidae
- Genus: Litoprosopus
- Species: L. confligens

Binomial name
- Litoprosopus confligens (Walker, 1858)

= Litoprosopus confligens =

Species of moth

Litoprosopus confligens is a species of moth in the family Noctuidae (the owlet moths). It is found in North America.
