= Taygete consociata =

Scientific classification
- Kingdom: Animalia
- Phylum: Arthropoda
- Class: Insecta
- Order: Lepidoptera
- Family: Autostichidae
- Genus: Taygete
- Species: T. consociata

Binomial name
- Taygete consociata (Meyrick, 1914)

Synonyms
- Epithectis consociata Meyrick, 1914

Species of moth

Taygete consociata is a moth in the family Autostichidae. It was described by Edward Meyrick in 1914. It is found in Guyana.

The wingspan is about 8 mm. The forewings are whitish, sprinkled with grey, and irregularly spotted with light yellowish suffusion. There is an oblique blackish dot beneath the fold at one-fourth, and a small blackish spot on the dorsum slightly before it. The discal stigmata are black, and small oblique-triangular blackish spots on the costa above them. The black dots near the dorsum beneath these stigmata, the second connected with a small blackish tornal spot. There is a black dot towards the termen in the middle, as well as some black dots around the apical portion of the costa and termen. The hindwings are rather dark grey, in the disc anteriorly and towards the dorsum subhyaline (almost glass like).
