= Diacme liparalis =

Scientific classification
- Kingdom: Animalia
- Phylum: Arthropoda
- Clade: Pancrustacea
- Class: Insecta
- Order: Lepidoptera
- Family: Crambidae
- Genus: Diacme
- Species: D. liparalis

Binomial name
- Diacme liparalis (Guenée, 1854)

Synonyms
- Samea liparalis Guenée, 1854

Species of moth

Diacme liparalis is a moth in the family Crambidae. It was described by Achille Guenée in 1854. It is found in Brazil.
