= Taygete sphecophila =

Scientific classification
- Kingdom: Animalia
- Phylum: Arthropoda
- Class: Insecta
- Order: Lepidoptera
- Family: Autostichidae
- Genus: Taygete
- Species: T. sphecophila

Binomial name
- Taygete sphecophila (Meyrick, 1936)

Synonyms
- Epithectis sphecophila Meyrick, 1936

Species of moth

Taygete sphecophila is a moth in the family Autostichidae. It was described by Edward Meyrick in 1936. It is found in Trinidad.
