= Oenobotys =

Scientific classification
- Domain: Eukaryota
- Kingdom: Animalia
- Phylum: Arthropoda
- Class: Insecta
- Order: Lepidoptera
- Family: Crambidae
- Subfamily: Pyraustinae
- Genus: Oenobotys; Munroe, 1976

Genus of moths

Oenobotys is a genus of moths of the family Crambidae.

== Species ==
- Oenobotys glirialis (Herrich-Schäffer, 1871)
- Oenobotys invinacealis Ferguson, Hilburn & Wright, 1991
- Oenobotys pantoppidani (Hedemann, 1894)
- Oenobotys texanalis Munroe, E. & A. Blanchard in Munroe, 1976
- Oenobotys vinotinctalis (Hampson, 1895)
