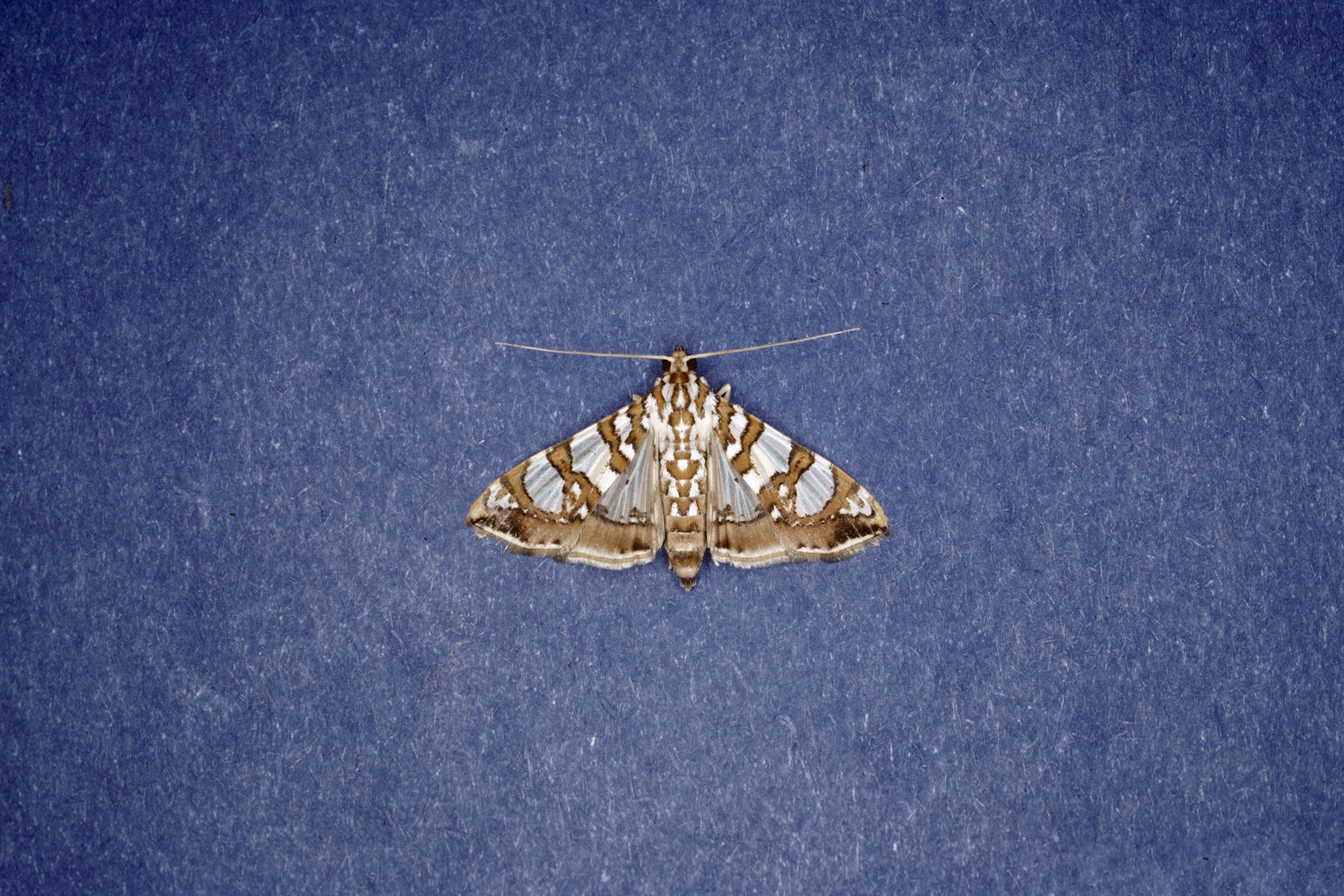

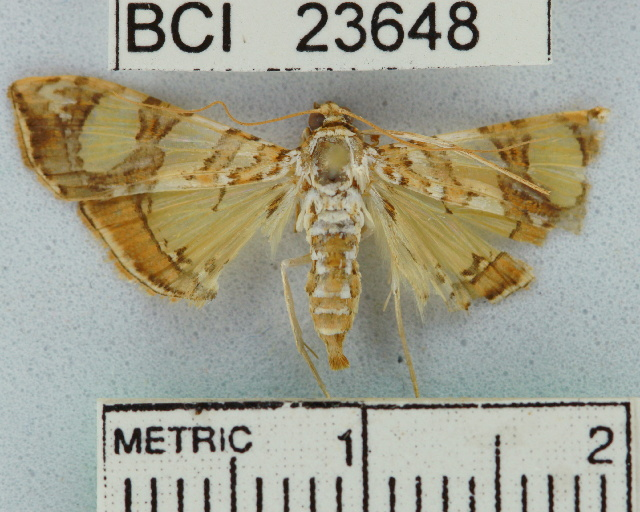

Scientific classification
- Kingdom: Animalia
- Phylum: Arthropoda
- Clade: Pancrustacea
- Class: Insecta
- Order: Lepidoptera
- Family: Crambidae
- Genus: Glyphodes
- Species: G. sibillalis

Binomial name
- Glyphodes sibillalis Walker, 1859

Synonyms
- Margaronia sibillalis; Glyphodes sibillalis berlandi Munroe, 1956; Botys impuralis Herrich-Schäffer, 1871; Glyphodes batesi Felder & Rogenhofer, 1875; Glyphodes atlitalis Hulst, 1886

= Glyphodes sibillalis =

Species of moth

Glyphodes sibillalis, the mulberry leaftier moth, is a moth of the family Crambidae. It is found in the southern United States (including Georgia), Central and South America and the West Indies.

The larvae feed on Morus (mulberry) species.

== Gallery ==
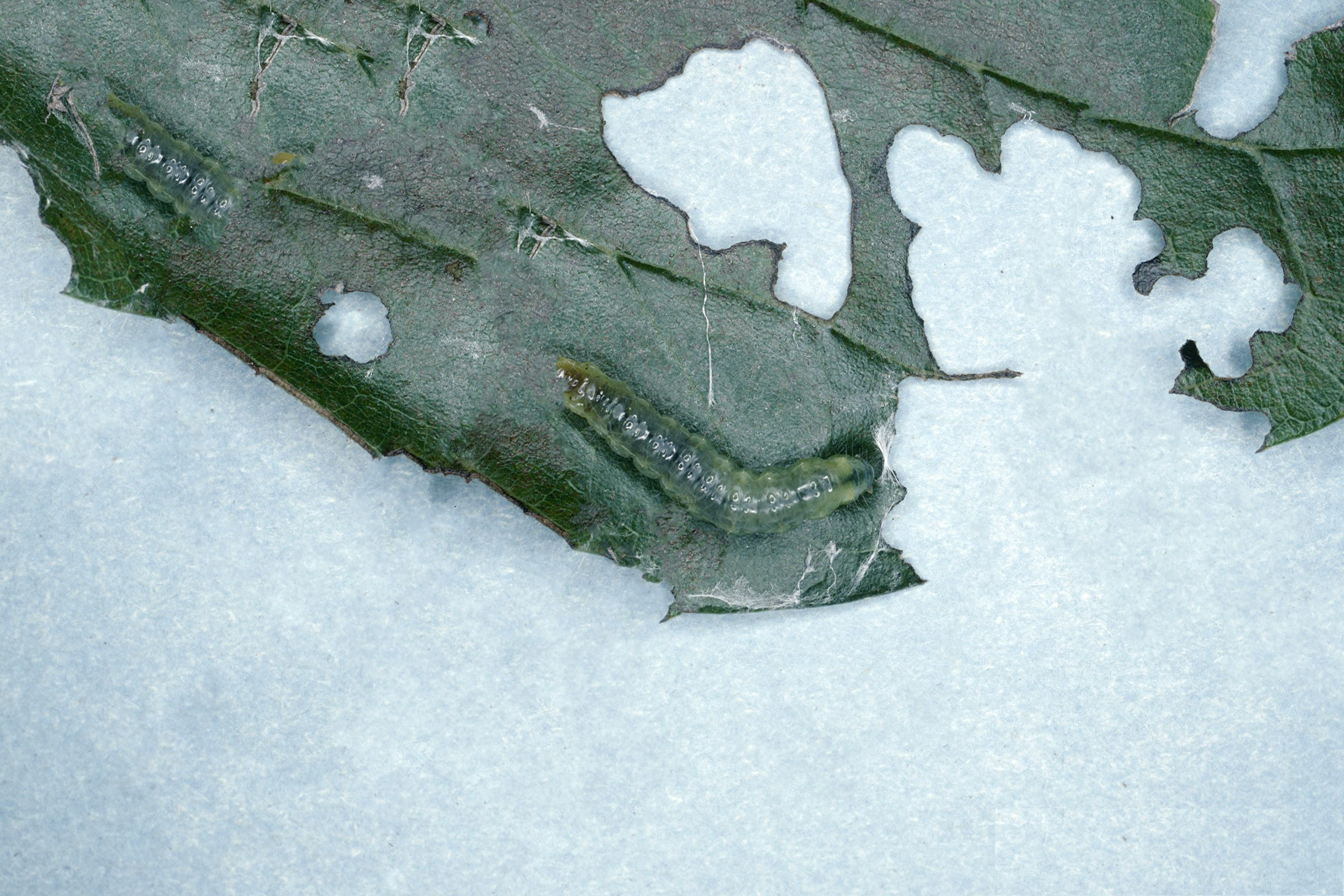
Larva

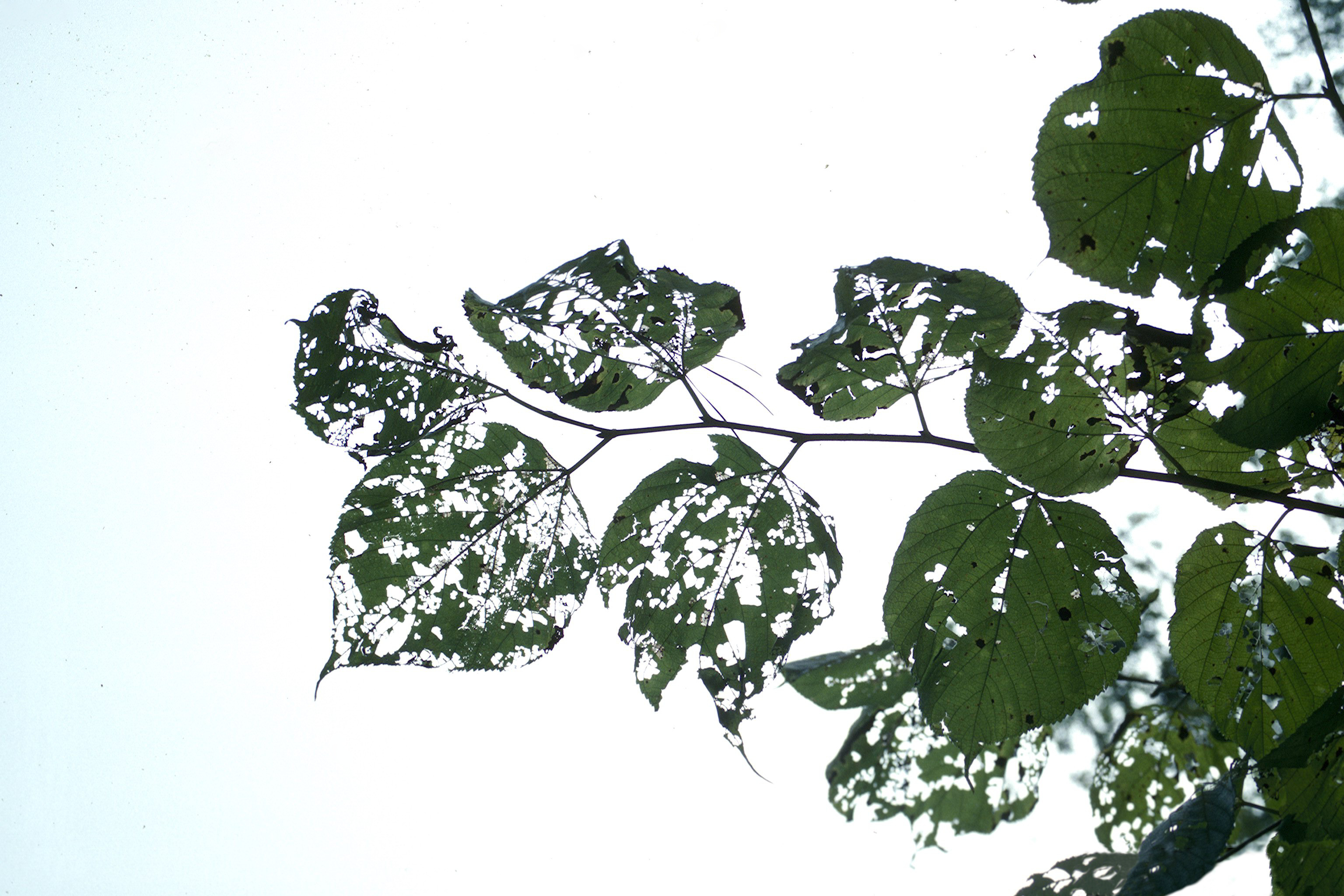
Damage

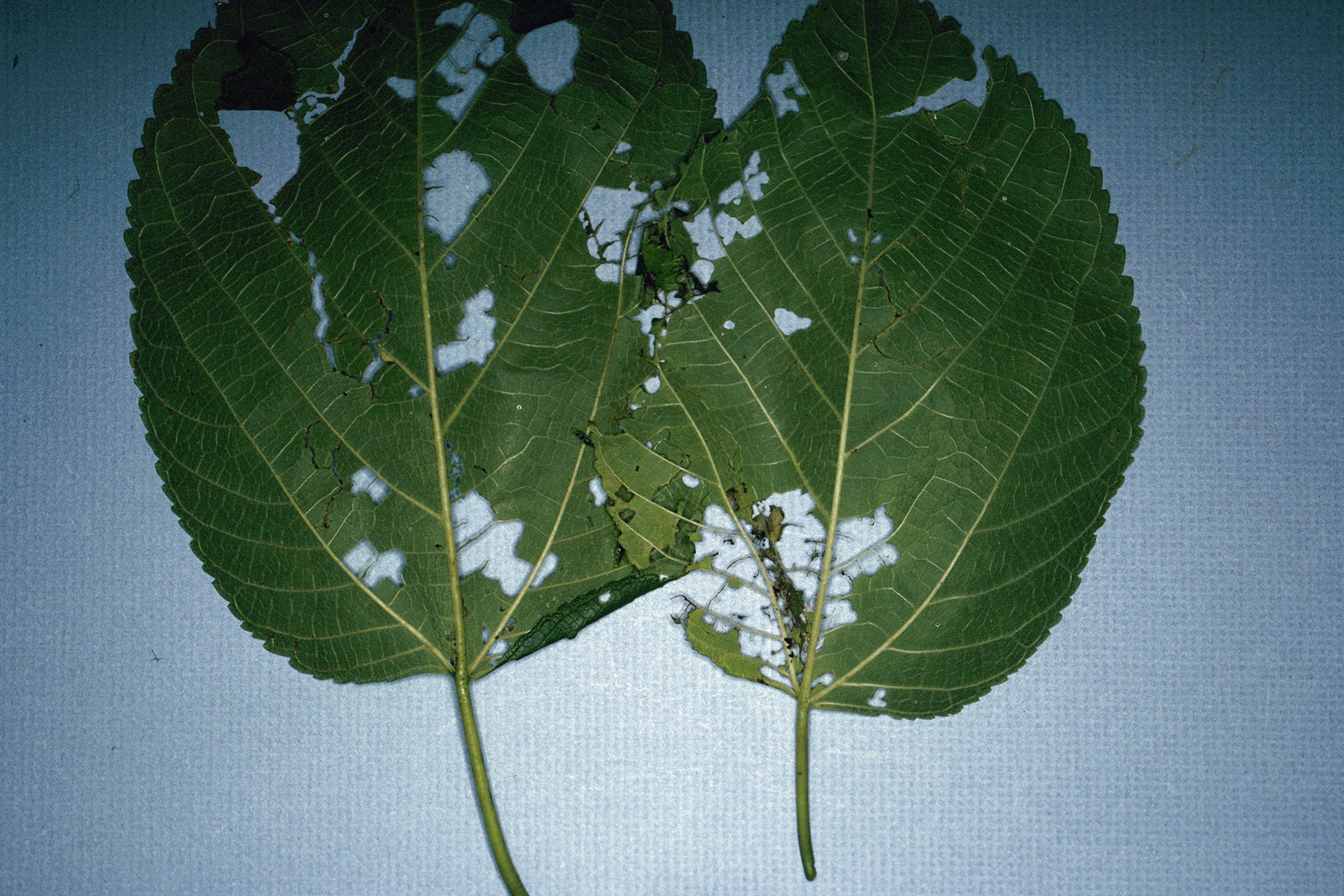
Damage

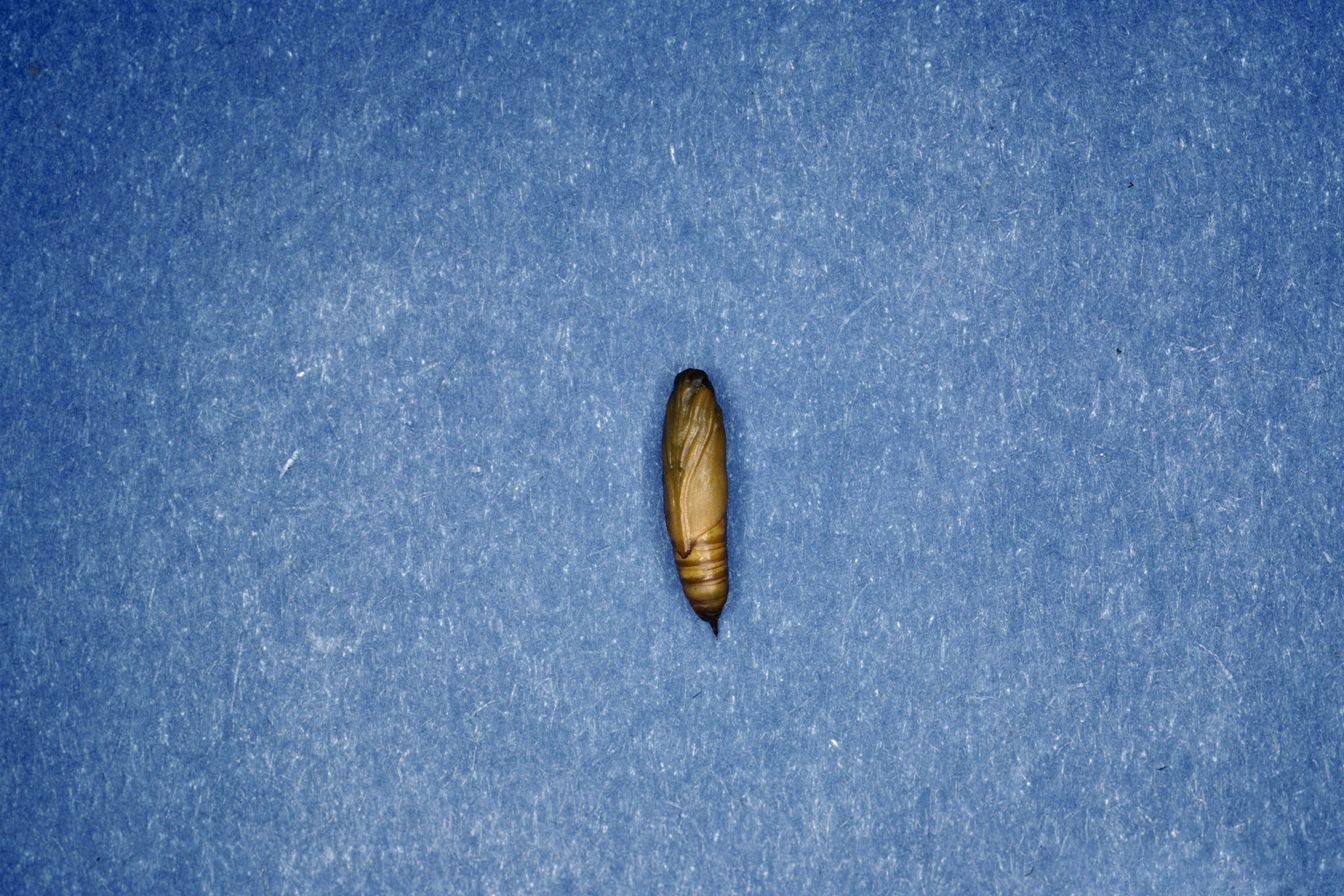
Pupa

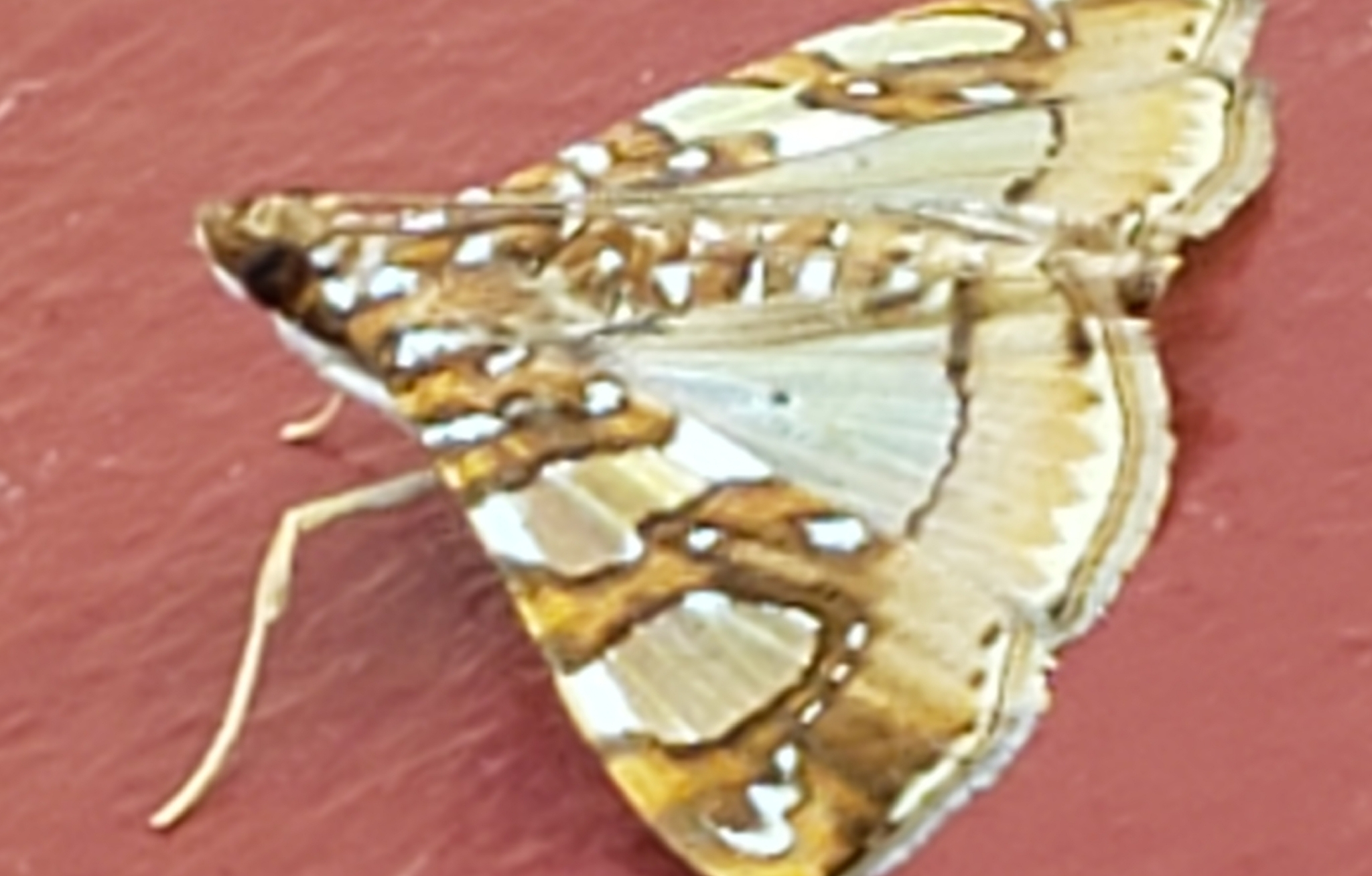
Adult
