= Oenobotys invinacealis =

Scientific classification
- Domain: Eukaryota
- Kingdom: Animalia
- Phylum: Arthropoda
- Class: Insecta
- Order: Lepidoptera
- Family: Crambidae
- Genus: Oenobotys
- Species: O. invinacealis

Binomial name
- Oenobotys invinacealis Ferguson, Hilburn & Wright, 1991

Species of moth

Oenobotys invinacealis is a moth in the family Crambidae. It was described by Alexander Douglas Campbell Ferguson, D. J. Hilburn and B. Wright in 1991. It is found on Bermuda.
