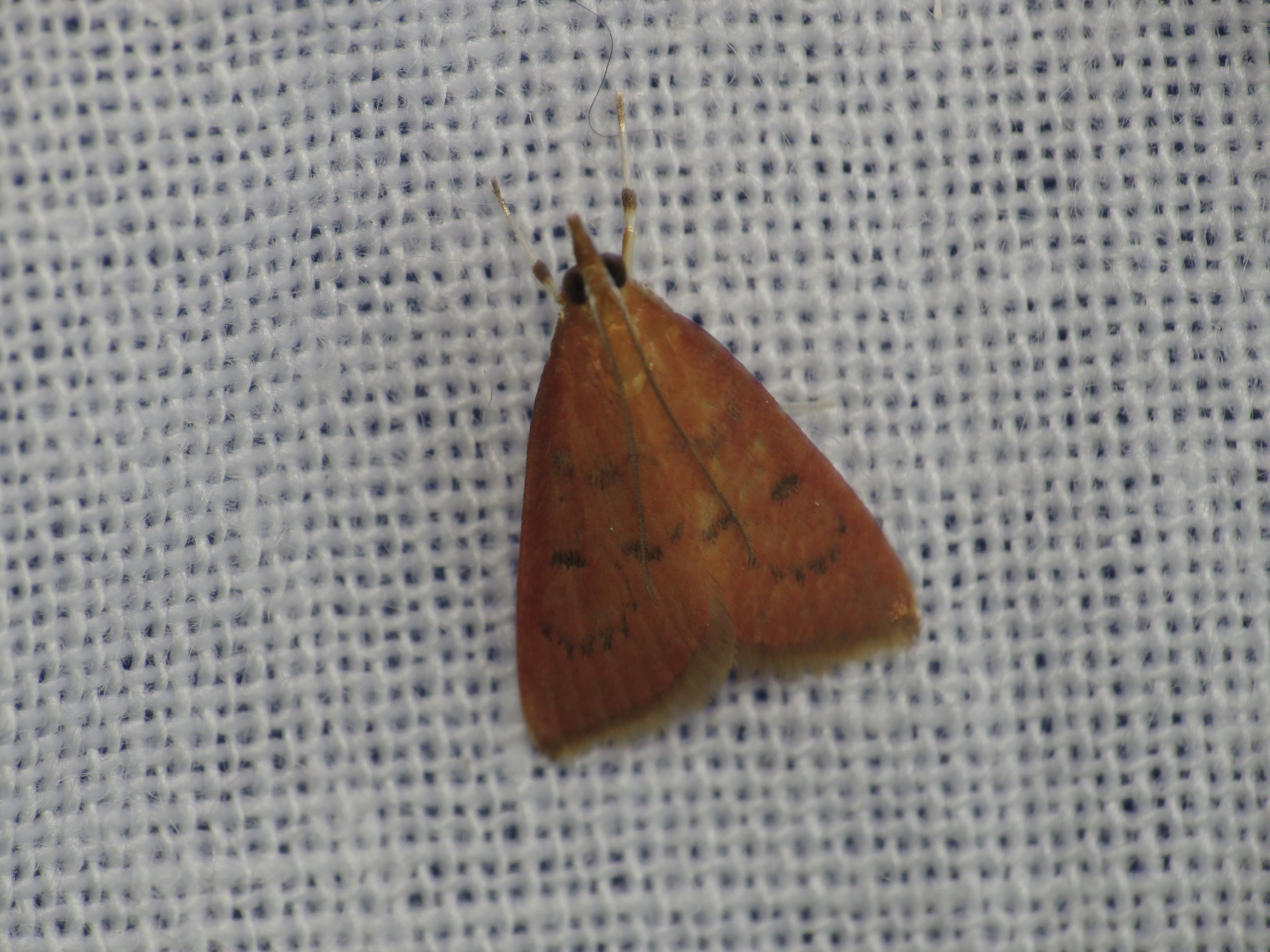

Scientific classification
- Kingdom: Animalia
- Phylum: Arthropoda
- Class: Insecta
- Order: Lepidoptera
- Family: Crambidae
- Genus: Oenobotys
- Species: O. vinotinctalis

Binomial name
- Oenobotys vinotinctalis (Hampson, 1895)

Synonyms
- Pionea vinotinctalis Hampson, 1895

= Oenobotys vinotinctalis =

Species of moth

Oenobotys vinotinctalis, the wine-tinted oenobotys moth, is a moth in the family Crambidae. It was described by George Hampson in 1895. It is found in the United States, where it has been recorded from North Carolina to Florida, west to Texas. It is also found in the West Indies and from Mexico to Central America.

== Etymology ==
The species name refers to the color of the forewings and is derived from Latin vinum (meaning wine) and tinctus (meaning a dye).
