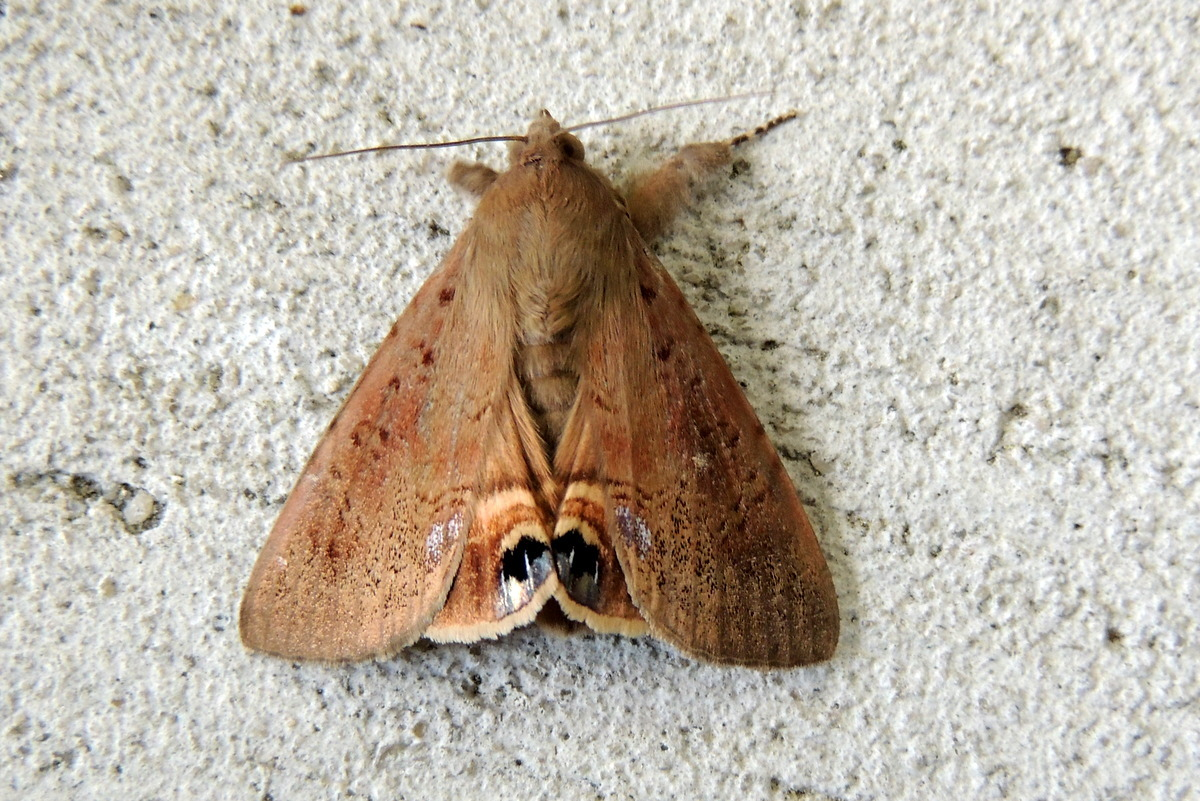

Scientific classification
- Kingdom: Animalia
- Phylum: Arthropoda
- Class: Insecta
- Order: Lepidoptera
- Superfamily: Noctuoidea
- Family: Noctuidae
- Genus: Litoprosopus
- Species: L. futilis

Binomial name
- Litoprosopus futilis (Grote & Robinson, 1868)

= Litoprosopus futilis =

Species of moth

Litoprosopus futilis, known generally as the palmetto borer moth or cabbage palm caterpillar, is a species of moth in the family Noctuidae (the owlet moths). It is found in North America.
