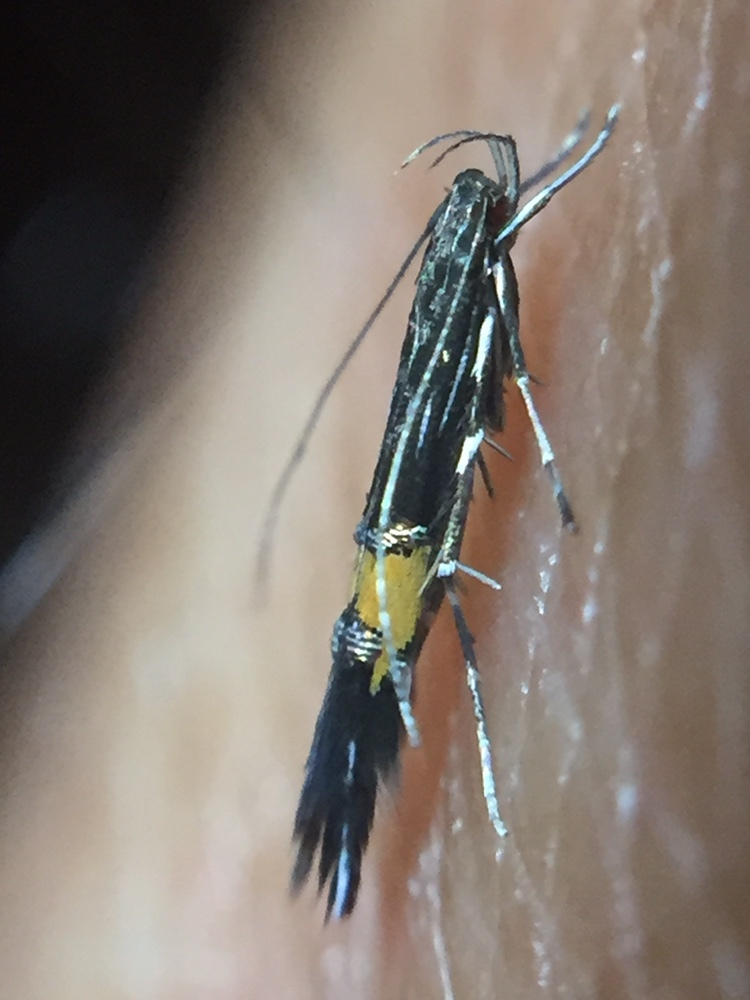

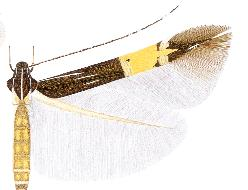

Scientific classification
- Kingdom: Animalia
- Phylum: Arthropoda
- Class: Insecta
- Order: Lepidoptera
- Family: Cosmopterigidae
- Genus: Cosmopterix
- Species: C. attenuatella

Binomial name
- Cosmopterix attenuatella (Walker, 1864)

Synonyms
- Gelechia attenuatella Walker, 1864; Cosmopterix flavofasciata E. Wollaston, 1879; Cosmopterix mimetis Meyrick, 1897; Cosmopteryx venefica Meyrick, 1915; Cosmopteryx apiculata Meyrick, 1922; Cosmopterix antillia Forbes, 1931

= Cosmopterix attenuatella =

Species of moth

Cosmopterix attenuatella is a moth of the family Cosmopterigidae described by Francis Walker in 1864. It is widely distributed in the tropics and subtropics of both the Old and New World, including the United States, Bermuda, the Cayman Islands, Virgin Islands, Dominica, Jamaica, Puerto Rico, Trinidad and Tobago, Costa Rica, Brazil, Ecuador, Peru, Argentina, the Canary Islands, Madeira, the Galápagos Islands, Cook Islands, Taiwan, Australia, New Zealand, China, Japan, Madagascar, Seychelles, Mauritius and Saint Helena.

== Description ==
The wingspan is about 9 mm.

== Larval hosts ==
The larvae feed on Poaceae (Melinus minutiflora), Cyperus rotundus and Scirpus species. They mine the leaves of their host plant.
