= Episimus utilis =

Scientific classification
- Domain: Eukaryota
- Kingdom: Animalia
- Phylum: Arthropoda
- Class: Insecta
- Order: Lepidoptera
- Family: Tortricidae
- Genus: Episimus
- Species: E. utilis

Binomial name
- Episimus utilis Zimmerman, 1978

Species of moth

Episimus utilis is a moth of the family Tortricidae. It was first described by Elwood Zimmerman in 1978. It is native to Brazil, but has been introduced to Hawaii in 1954 to aid in the control of Christmas berry or Brazilian peppertree.
