= Caloptilia perseae =

Scientific classification
- Kingdom: Animalia
- Phylum: Arthropoda
- Class: Insecta
- Order: Lepidoptera
- Family: Gracillariidae
- Genus: Caloptilia
- Species: C. perseae

Binomial name
- Caloptilia perseae (Busck, 1920)

Species of moth

Caloptilia perseae is a moth of the family Gracillariidae. It is known from Cuba and Florida in the United States.

The larvae feed on Persea americana and Persea persea. They mine the leaves of their host plant. The mine has the form of a small mine between the veins of young leaves. Later, the larva folds the tip or sides of the leaf downwards.
