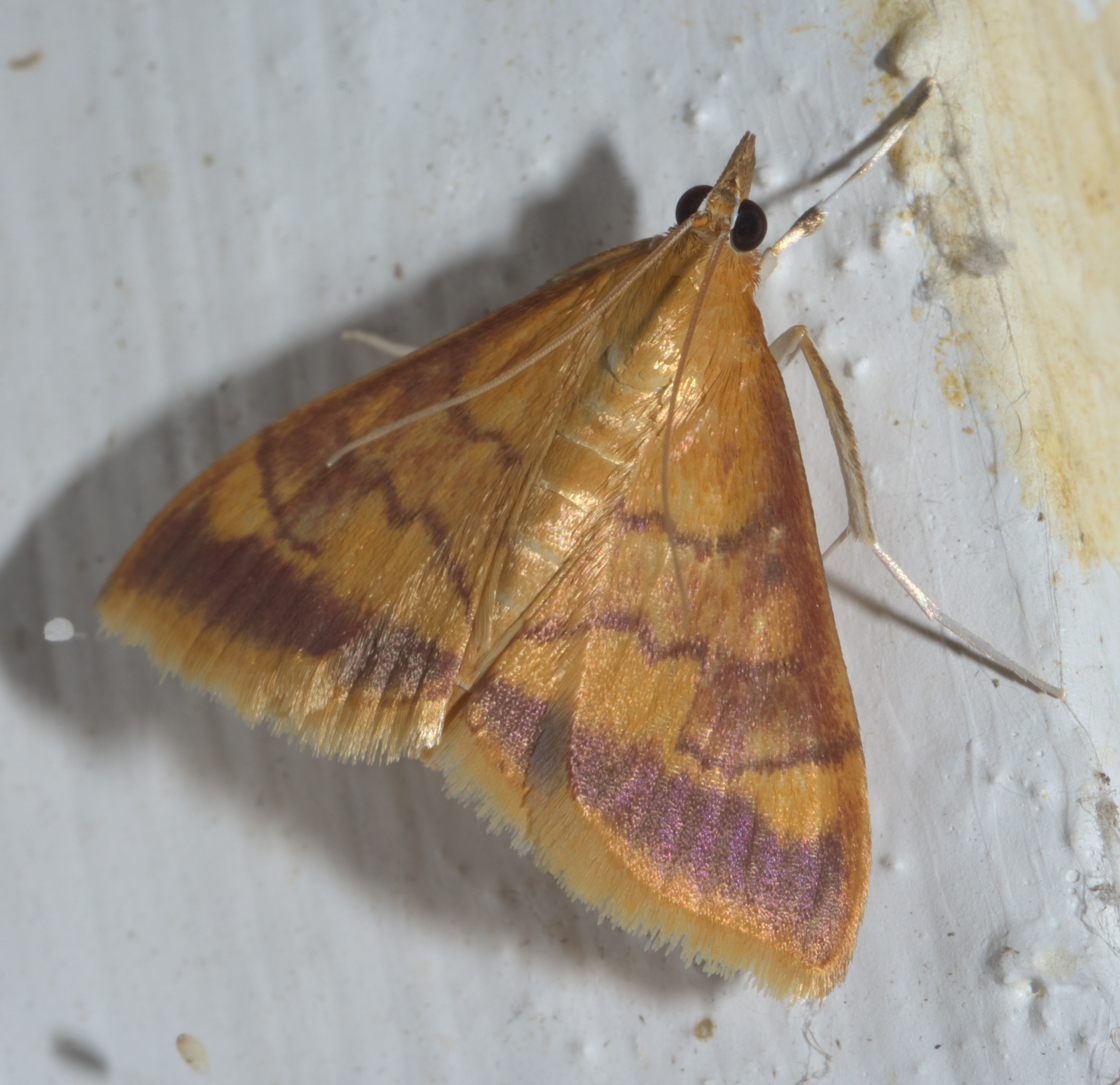

Scientific classification
- Kingdom: Animalia
- Phylum: Arthropoda
- Class: Insecta
- Order: Lepidoptera
- Family: Crambidae
- Genus: Pyrausta
- Species: P. onythesalis

Binomial name
- Pyrausta onythesalis (Walker, 1859)

Synonyms
- Botys onythesalis Walker, 1859

= Pyrausta onythesalis =

Species of moth

Pyrausta onythesalis is a moth in the family Crambidae. It was described by Francis Walker in 1859. It is found in North America, where it has been recorded from Florida to Georgia, Iowa, Kansas, Oklahoma, Texas and Arizona.

The wingspan is 17–21 mm. The exterior line and a broad submarginal band on the wings are purplish red. Adults have been recorded on wing from March to October.
