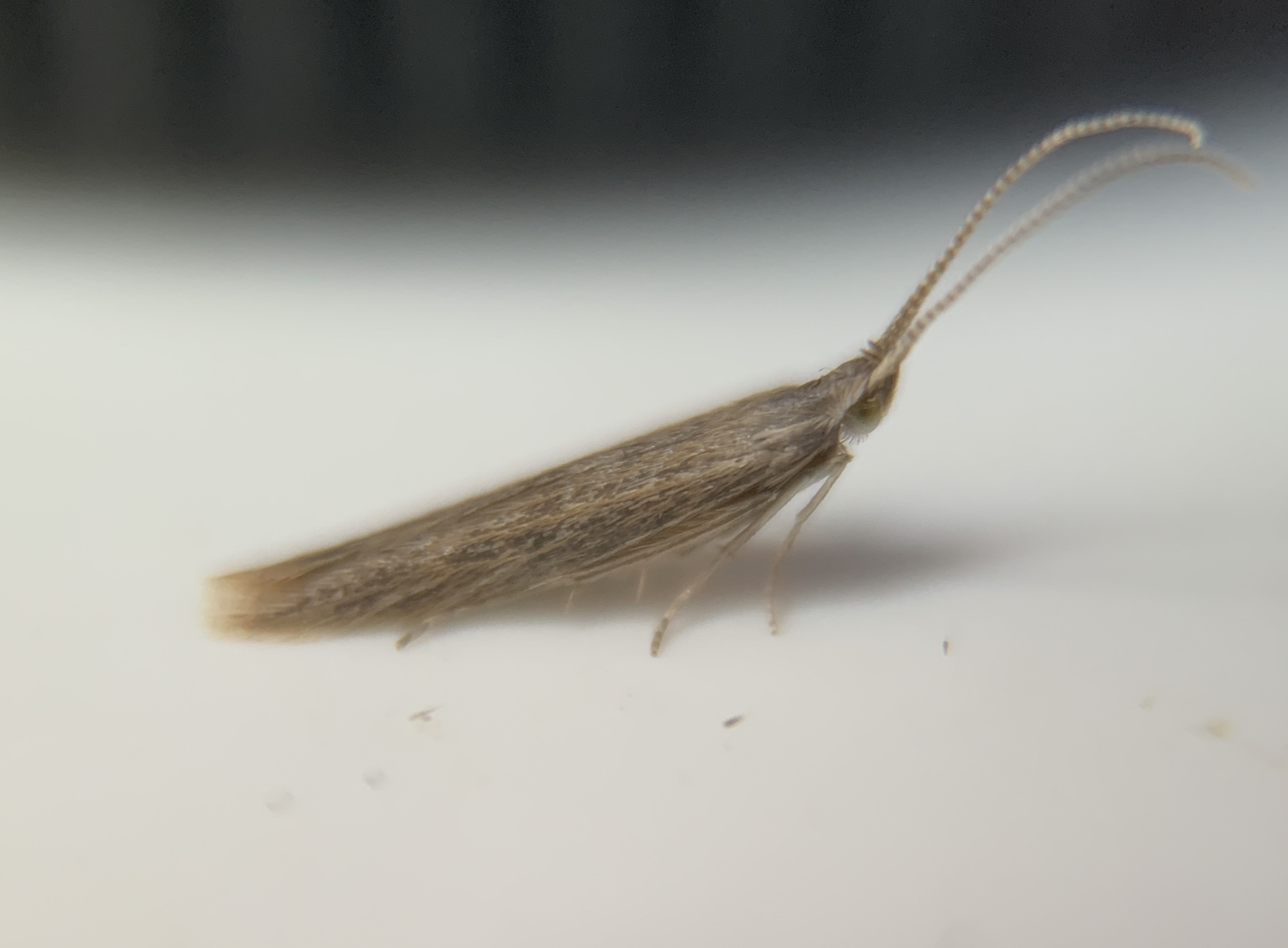

Scientific classification
- Kingdom: Animalia
- Phylum: Arthropoda
- Clade: Pancrustacea
- Class: Insecta
- Order: Lepidoptera
- Family: Coleophoridae
- Genus: Coleophora
- Species: C. texanella

Binomial name
- Coleophora texanella Chambers, 1878

Synonyms
- Coleophora vagans Walsingham, 1907; Coleophora coxi Baldizzone & van der Wolf, 2007

= Coleophora texanella =

Species of moth

Coleophora texanella is a moth of the family Coleophoridae. It is found in the United States, where it has been recorded from Florida to California, north to New York, Michigan and Ohio, west to Kansas and also in Mexico (Baja California Sur). It has also been recorded from Bermuda and Europe, where it is found in Italy (including Sicily) and in Greece (Zakynthos, the Peloponnesos and Crete).

The wingspan is 10–11 mm. There are two generations per year.

The larvae feed on the seeds of Portulaca species, including Portulaca oleracea.
