= Taygete parvella =

Scientific classification
- Domain: Eukaryota
- Kingdom: Animalia
- Phylum: Arthropoda
- Class: Insecta
- Order: Lepidoptera
- Family: Autostichidae
- Genus: Taygete
- Species: T. parvella

Binomial name
- Taygete parvella (Fabricius, 1794)

Synonyms
- Alucita parvella Fabricius, 1794; Epithectis xylochroa Meyrick, 1926

Species of moth

Taygete parvella is a moth in the family Autostichidae. It was described by Johan Christian Fabricius in 1794. It is found on Bermuda.

The wingspan is about 11 mm. The forewings are light brown, with a few scattered black specks. The markings are blackish. There is a small spot on the base of the costa, and an elongate mark at about one-fifth, a moderate spot on the costa at two-fifths, the plical stigma moderate, cloudy, directly beneath this, the first discal similar but slightly anterior. There is a subquadrate blotch on the costa at three-fourths, the second discal stigma rather large, nearly or quite touching this, an elongate mark on the dorsal edge anterior to these. There are sometimes two or three undefined dots on the termen. The hindwings are whitish grey.
