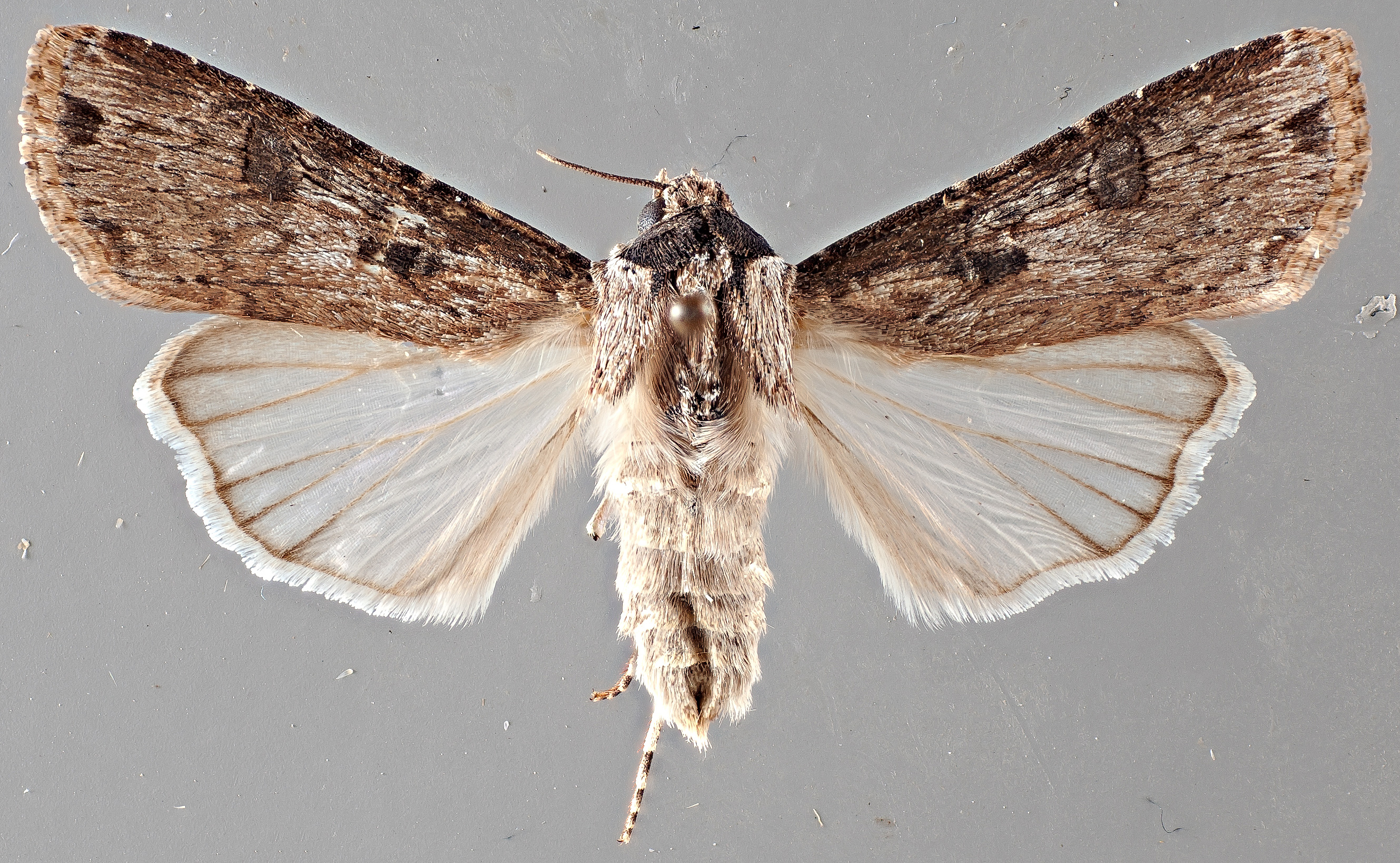

Scientific classification
- Kingdom: Animalia
- Phylum: Arthropoda
- Clade: Pancrustacea
- Class: Insecta
- Order: Lepidoptera
- Superfamily: Noctuoidea
- Family: Noctuidae
- Genus: Agrotis
- Species: A. malefida

Binomial name
- Agrotis malefida Guenée, 1852

Synonyms
- Noctua robusta; Agrotis inspinosa; Agrotis consueta; Agrotis submucosa; ?Agrotis koehleri

= Agrotis malefida =

Species of moth

Agrotis malefida, the rascal dart or palesided cutworm, is a moth in the family Noctuidae. Its range extends from North Carolina and Kentucky south to Florida, west to Arizona, and north to southern Kansas. It is also found in the Neotropics, from Mexico to Argentina and Chile.

The wingspan of Agrotis malefida is 40–50 mm (1.6–2.0 in), with forewings is 18–23 mm (0.71–0.91 in). Adults emerge in late January in the northern part of its range, while in the southern regions, they fly throughout the year.

The larvae feed on a variety of broad-leaved herbaceous plants, including Brassica oleracea, Trifolium, Fabaceae, Allium, Pisum sativum, Capsicum, Solanum tuberosum, Nicotiana, Solanum lycopersicum as well as various weeds. This moth is considered a pest on crops like Zea mays and Gossypium.
