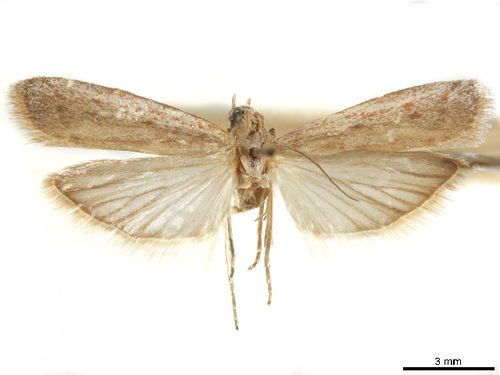

Scientific classification
- Domain: Eukaryota
- Kingdom: Animalia
- Phylum: Arthropoda
- Class: Insecta
- Order: Lepidoptera
- Family: Pyralidae
- Subfamily: Phycitinae
- Genus: Cassiana; Heinrich, 1956
- Species: C. malacella

Binomial name
- Cassiana malacella (Dyar, 1914)

Synonyms
- Vitula malacella Dyar, 1914

= Cassiana =

Genus of moths

Cassiana is a monotypic snout moth genus described by Carl Heinrich in 1956. Its only species, Cassiana malacella, was described by Harrison Gray Dyar Jr. in 1914. It is found in Mexico, the southern United States, the British Virgin Islands Puerto Rico and Bermuda.

The wingspan is 15–17 mm. The forewings are pale grayish fuscous, although the area between the cell and the costa is white with a faint, scattered dusting of reddish scales. The hindwings are whitish, the veins outlined by dark scales, and a narrow smoky border along the termen and costa.
