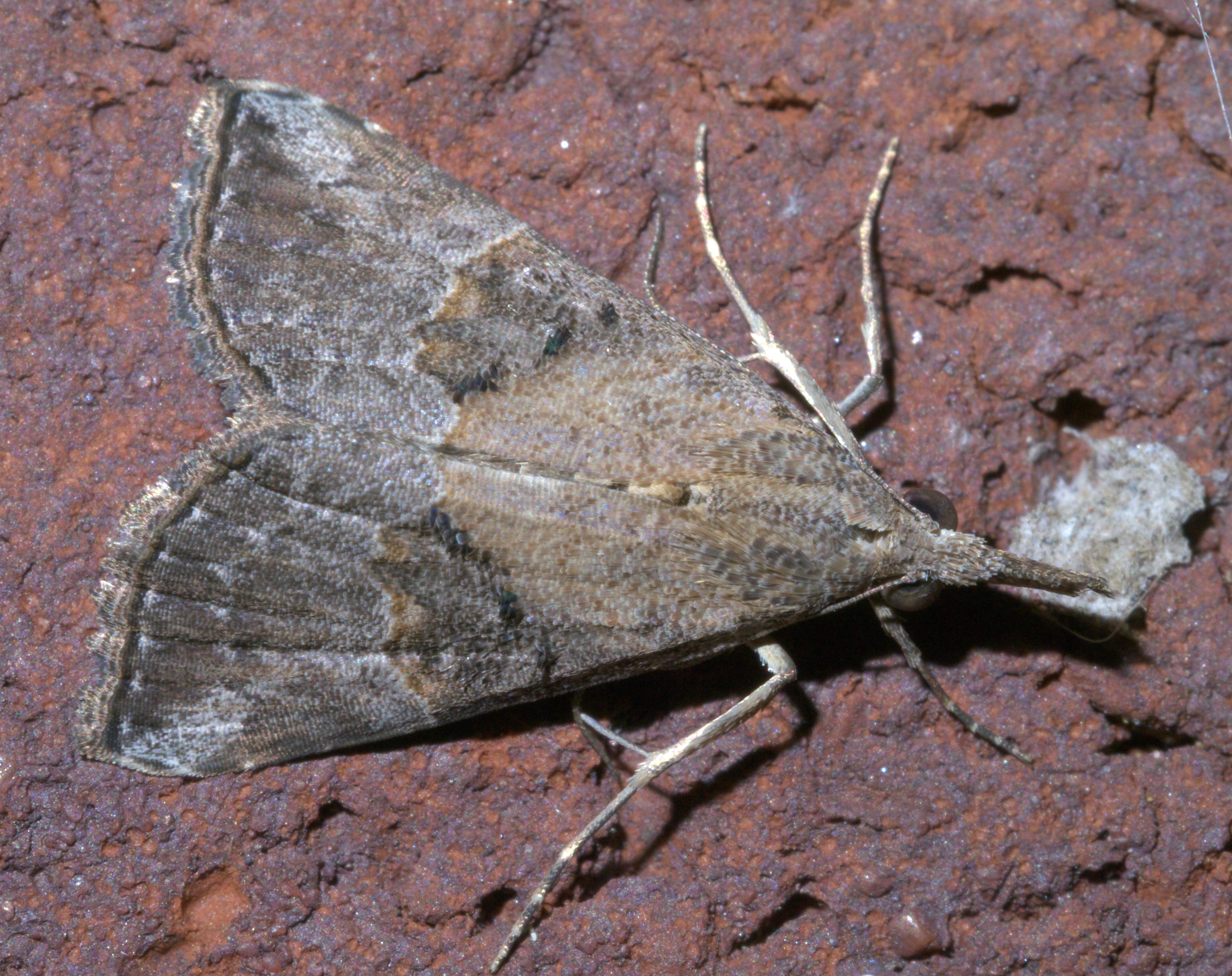

Scientific classification
- Kingdom: Animalia
- Phylum: Arthropoda
- Class: Insecta
- Order: Lepidoptera
- Superfamily: Noctuoidea
- Family: Erebidae
- Genus: Hypena
- Species: H. minualis

Binomial name
- Hypena minualis Guenée, 1854

= Hypena minualis =

Species of moth

Hypena minualis, the sooty hypena or sooty bomolocha moth, is a moth in the family Erebidae. The species was first described by Achille Guenée in 1854. It is found in North America.

The MONA or Hodges number for Hypena minualis is 8457.
