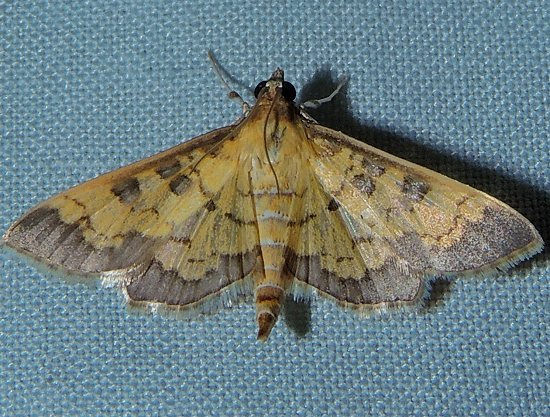

Scientific classification
- Kingdom: Animalia
- Phylum: Arthropoda
- Clade: Pancrustacea
- Class: Insecta
- Order: Lepidoptera
- Family: Crambidae
- Genus: Diacme
- Species: D. elealis

Binomial name
- Diacme elealis (Walker, 1859)

Synonyms
- Samea elealis Walker, 1859; Botys taedialis Walker, 1859

= Diacme elealis =

Paler diacme moth

Species of moth

Diacme elealis, the paler diacme moth, is a moth in the family Crambidae. It was described by Francis Walker in 1859. It is found in North America, where it has been recorded from Virginia to Florida, west to Kentucky and Texas. It can also be found on the island of Puerto Rico and the isles of Bermuda.

The wingspan is 17–23mm.
