= Scoparia jonesalis =

Scientific classification
- Kingdom: Animalia
- Phylum: Arthropoda
- Class: Insecta
- Order: Lepidoptera
- Family: Crambidae
- Genus: Scoparia
- Species: S. jonesalis

Binomial name
- Scoparia jonesalis Dyar, 1915

Species of moth

Scoparia jonesalis is a moth in the family Crambidae. It was described by Harrison Gray Dyar Jr. in 1915. It is found on the Bermuda Islands.

The wingspan is about 13 mm. The ground color of the forewings is nearly white with a black inner line and black irroration in the median area. The outer line is whitish and the terminal area is powdered with black. The hindwings are faintly fuscous tinged. Adults have been recorded on wing in March and May.
