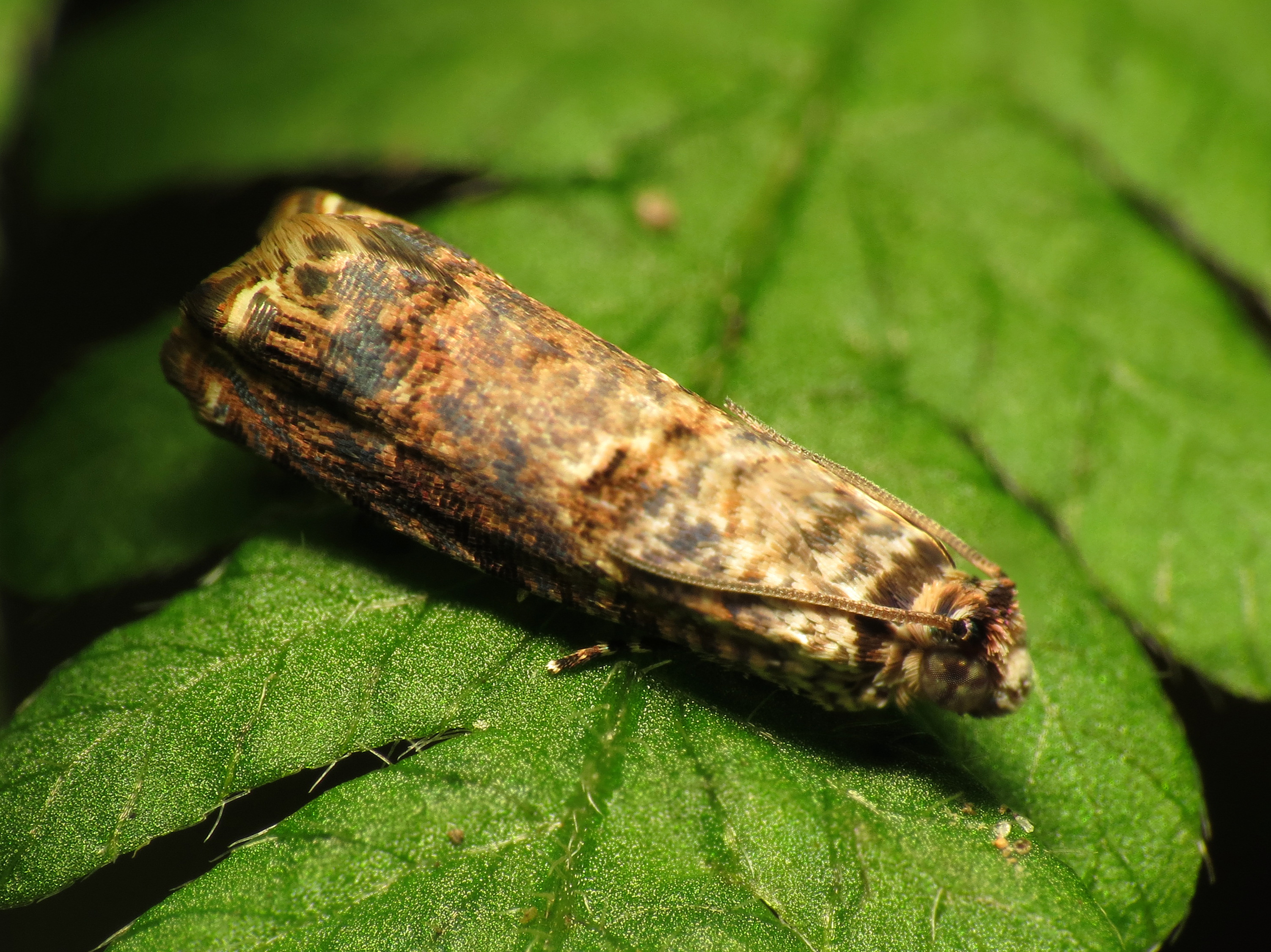
- Episimus argutanus

Scientific classification
- Domain: Eukaryota
- Kingdom: Animalia
- Phylum: Arthropoda
- Class: Insecta
- Order: Lepidoptera
- Family: Tortricidae
- Tribe: Olethreutini
- Genus: Episimus; Walsingham, 1892

Synonyms
- Antictenista Meyrick, 1927; Episemus Dyar, 1901

= Episimus =

Genus of tortrix moths

Episimus is a genus of moths belonging to the subfamily Olethreutinae of the family Tortricidae.

== Species ==
- Episimus argutana (Clemens, 1860)
- Episimus atrorufana (Walker, 1863)
- Episimus augmentana (Zeller, 1877)
- Episimus brunneomarginatus (Razowski & Wojtusiak, 2006)
- Episimus burserae Heppner, 1994
- Episimus caveata (Meyrick, 1912)
- Episimus condensatana (Zeller, 1877)
- Episimus cyanitis Meyrick, 1932
- Episimus descriptana (Walker, 1863)
- Episimus digna (Meyrick, 1917)
- Episimus guiana (Busck, 1913)
- Episimus kimballi Heppner, 1994
- Episimus lagunculariae Heppner, 1994
- Episimus ligneana (Felder & Rogenhofer, 1875)
- Episimus lupata (Meyrick, 1912)
- Episimus mahaiana (Felder & Rogenhofer, 1875)
- Episimus mesotricha (Meyrick, 1927)
- Episimus metaspilana (Walker, 1863)
- Episimus nesiotes Walsingham, 1897
- Episimus ortygia (Meyrick, 1917)
- Episimus phaedra (Meyrick, 1931)
- Episimus prudens (Meyrick, 1917)
- Episimus religiosa (Meyrick, 1917)
- Episimus selectana (Walker, 1863)
- Episimus selenosema Diakonoff, 1963
- Episimus semicirculana (Walker, 1863)
- Episimus silvaticus Razowski & Wojtusiak, 2008
- Episimus strigulana (Walker, 1863)
- Episimus terminana (Walker, 1863)
- Episimus transferrana (Walker, 1863)
- Episimus tyrius Heinrich, 1923
- Episimus unguiculus Clarke, 1951
- Episimus utilis Zimmerman, 1978
- Episimus vermiculata (Meyrick, 1912)
- Episimus vittata (Walsingham, 1914)

== See also ==
- List of Tortricidae genera
