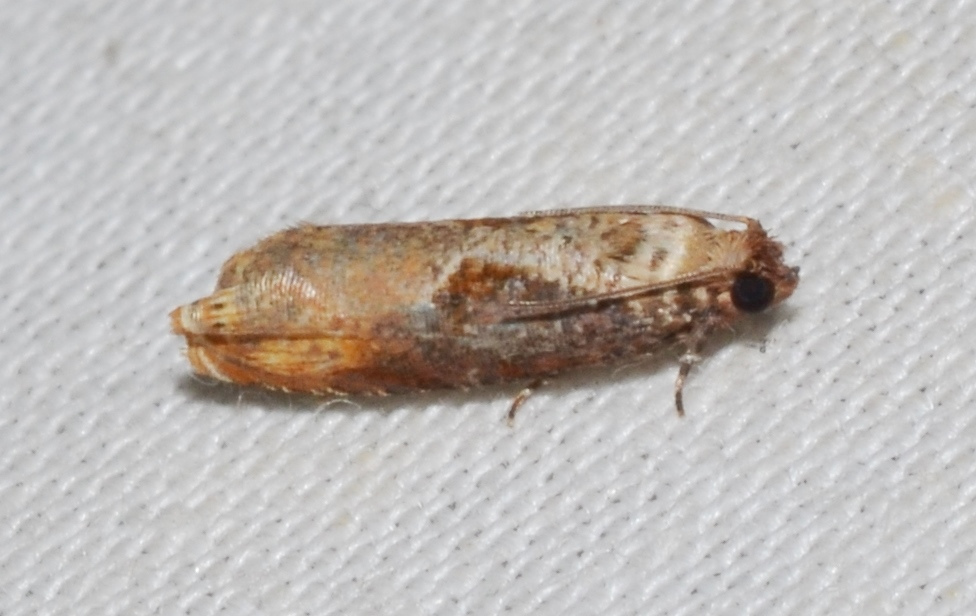

Scientific classification
- Domain: Eukaryota
- Kingdom: Animalia
- Phylum: Arthropoda
- Class: Insecta
- Order: Lepidoptera
- Family: Tortricidae
- Genus: Episimus
- Species: E. tyrius

Binomial name
- Episimus tyrius Heinrich, 1923

= Episimus tyrius =

Species of moth

Episimus tyrius, the maple tip borer moth or maple leaftier moth, is a species of moth in the family Tortricidae. It is found in the eastern United States from New York to Florida west to Texas.

The wingspan measures 9–12 mm. The moth flies year round in Florida, but flies from June to August in other parts of its range.

The larvae feed on mainly on maples (Acer), but may also use redbay (Persea borbonia) and Carolina laurelcherry (Prunus caroliniana).
