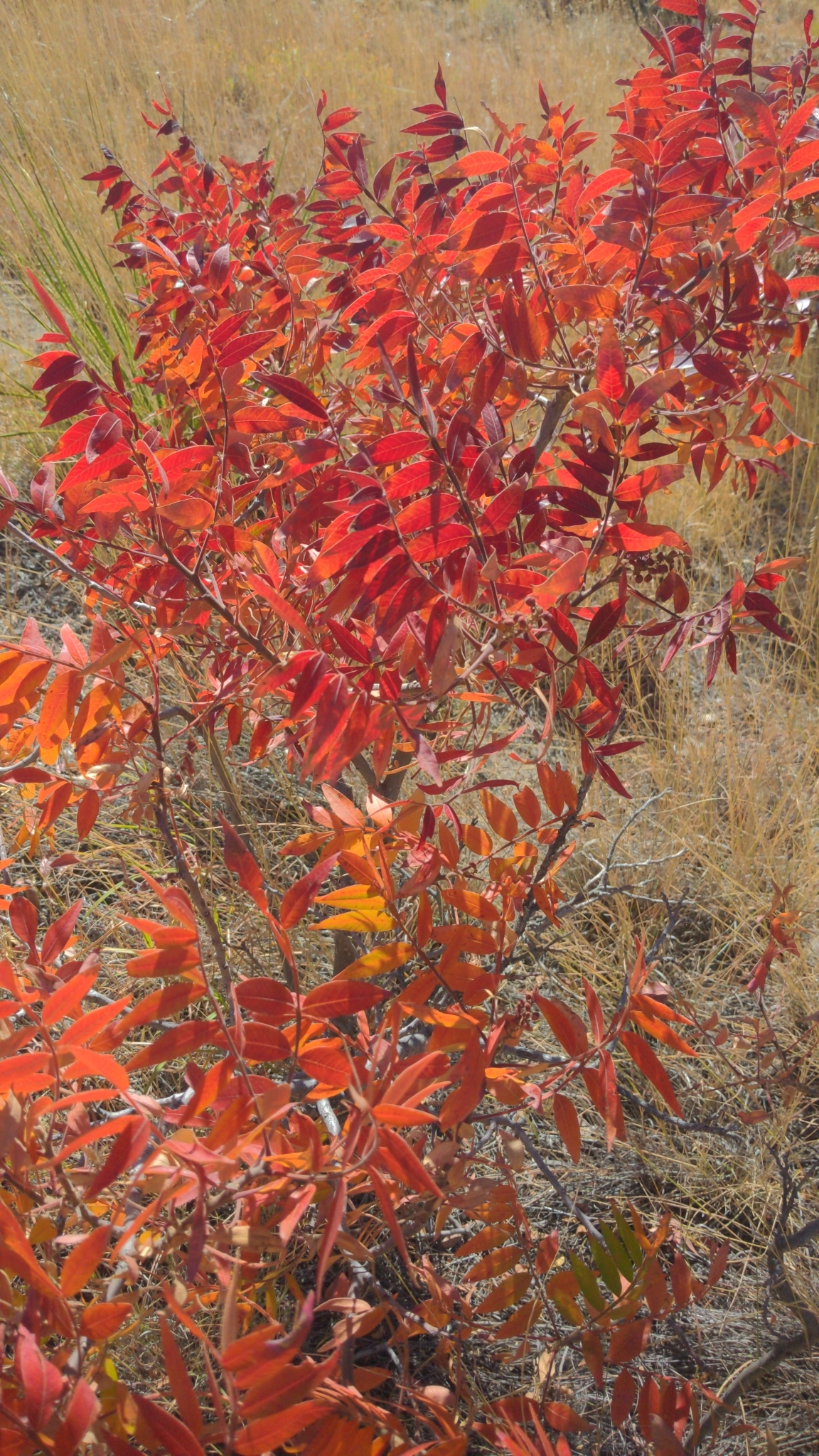

Scientific classification
- Kingdom: Plantae
- Clade: Tracheophytes
- Clade: Angiosperms
- Clade: Eudicots
- Clade: Rosids
- Order: Sapindales
- Family: Anacardiaceae
- Genus: Rhus
- Species: R. lanceolata

Binomial name
- Rhus lanceolata (A. Gray) Britton

Synonyms
- Rhus copallinum var. lanceolata A. Gray; Schmaltzia lanceolata (A. Gray) Small

= Rhus lanceolata =

Species of tree

Rhus lanceolata, the prairie sumac, is a species of plant native to the south-western United States (Texas, Oklahoma, Arizona, New Mexico), and northern Mexico (Coahuila, Nuevo León and Tamaulipas).

Rhus lanceolata is a shrub or small tree up to 9 m (30 feet) tall, reproducing by means of underground rhizomes. Leaves are pinnately compound with 13-17 lanceolate leaflets and a winged rachis. Leaflets are entire (untoothed) or with small teeth, green and shiny above but whitish and pubescent below. Flowers are born in a panicle up to 14 cm (5.6 inches) tall. Flowers are white to greenish. Fruits are lens-shaped, about 6 mm (0.25 inches) across, dark red and hairy.

== Uses ==
Birds eat the fruit during the winter, and deer forage the foliage. The tannin-containing leaves have been used to tan leather.
