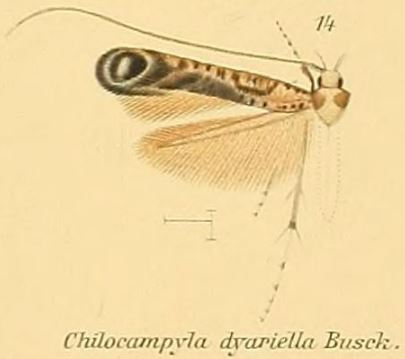

Scientific classification
- Domain: Eukaryota
- Kingdom: Animalia
- Phylum: Arthropoda
- Class: Insecta
- Order: Lepidoptera
- Family: Gracillariidae
- Genus: Chilocampyla
- Species: C. dyariella

Binomial name
- Chilocampyla dyariella Busck, 1900

= Chilocampyla dyariella =

Species of moth

Chilocampyla dyariella is a moth of the family Gracillariidae. It is known from Florida, United States.

The wingspan is 7-8.5 mm.

The larvae feed on Eugenia species including Eugenia axillaris, Eugenia foetida, Eugenia garberi, Eugenia procera and Eugenia rhombea. They mine the leaves of their host plant. The mine has the form of a long narrow line along the edge of the leaf for about 25 mm and then turning inward suddenly broadening out in a large bladder-like blotch nearly covering the entire leaf. The upper and lower epidermis are separated and the leaf is inflated and yields to pressure like an air cushion. The mine shows whitish green on the underside, discoloured with purple on the upper side. The inside of the mine looks as if it is overgrown with a small, whitish pearly fungus. The larva is cylindrical, clear, transparent, with sparse white hairs and 14 legs. The head is light brown with darker reddish brown sutures and two black eyespots. When full grown, it leaves the mine, turns vivid wine red, and spins a dense, oval, yellowish grey cocoon in a slight fold on the leaf. The pupa is white at first. When mature the pupa assumes the coloration of the imago.
