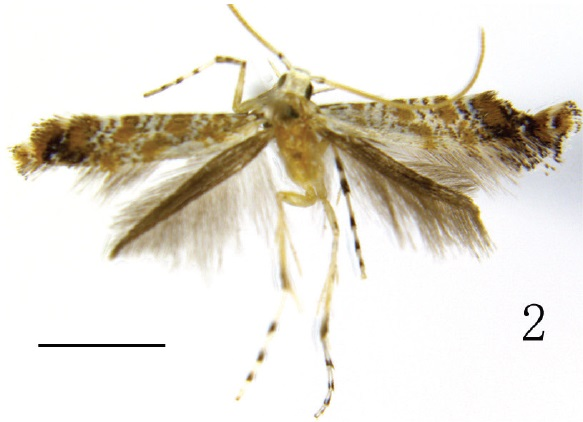
- Eumetriochroa hederae

Scientific classification
- Kingdom: Animalia
- Phylum: Arthropoda
- Class: Insecta
- Order: Lepidoptera
- Family: Gracillariidae
- Subfamily: Oecophyllembiinae; Réal & Balachowsky, 1966

Genera
- Six, see text

= Oecophyllembiinae =

Subfamily of moths

Oecophyllembiinae is a subfamily of moths described by Pierre Réal and Alfred Serge Balachowsky in 1966.

== Genera ==
In alphabetical order:

- Angelabella Vargas & Parra, 2005
- Corythoxestis Meyrick, 1921
- Eumetriochroa Kumata, 1998
- Guttigera Diakonoff, 1955
- Metriochroa Busck, 1900
- Prophyllocnistis Davis, 1994
