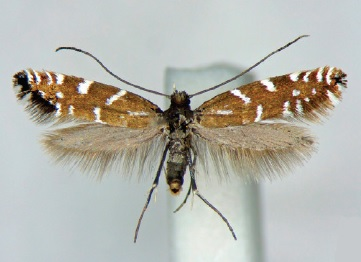
- Male
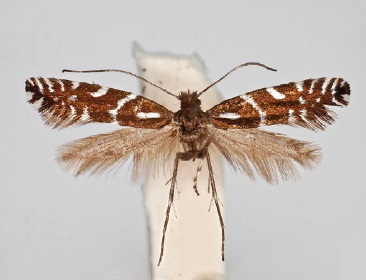
- Female

Scientific classification
- Kingdom: Animalia
- Phylum: Arthropoda
- Clade: Pancrustacea
- Class: Insecta
- Order: Lepidoptera
- Family: Gracillariidae
- Genus: Callisto
- Species: C. basistrigella

Binomial name
- Callisto basistrigella Huemer, Deutsch & Triberti, 2015

= Callisto basistrigella =

Species of moth

Callisto basistrigella is a moth of the family Gracillariidae. It is found in the south-eastern Alps, ranging from the Dolomites (Italy) in the west to the Julian Alps (Slovenia) in the east and the Carnic Alps and Lienzer Dolomiten (Austria) in the north. The habitats are related to the dwarf-shrub zone and include subalpine meadows, rock formations and scree with Salix-bushes and shrubs. The species is restricted to limestone with an altitudinal range from about 1,200 to 2,300 meters.

The wingspan is 10.5–13 mm. In external appearance adults are distinguishable from Callisto coffeella by the forewing pattern. In basistrigella, the sub-basal whitish silvery line of the forewing is almost parallel and lies in the fold, whereas in coffeella this line is transverse to the wing axis or reduced to a spot. On average, the forewings are slightly narrower than in coffeella. Sexual dimorphism, as observed in coffeella, is absent in basistrigella. Genitalia do not provide obvious diagnostic differences but the length of the phallus is significantly longer in basistrigella than in coffeella.

Adults have been collected during the day, flying around low bushes of alpine Salix glabra and Salix waldsteiniana. The flight period is largely dependent on exposure and snow coverage and usually extends between early June and late July.

== Etymology ==
The species name refers to the characteristic wing markings.
