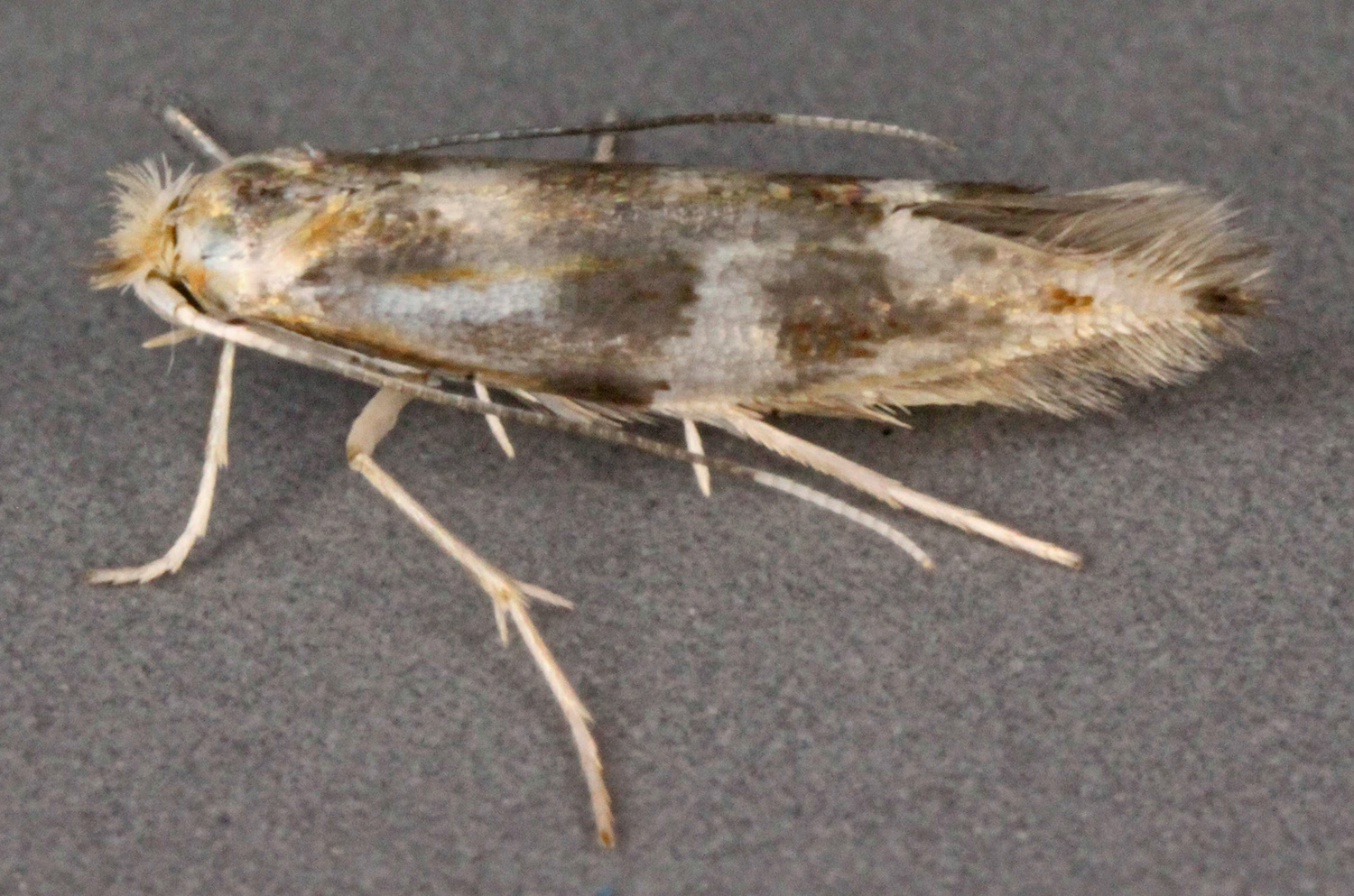
- Phyllonorycter salicicolella North Wales
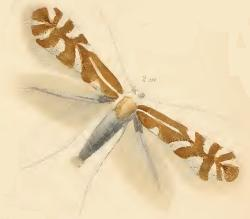

Scientific classification
- Domain: Eukaryota
- Kingdom: Animalia
- Phylum: Arthropoda
- Class: Insecta
- Order: Lepidoptera
- Family: Gracillariidae
- Genus: Phyllonorycter
- Species: P. salicicolella

Binomial name
- Phyllonorycter salicicolella (Sircom, 1848)

Synonyms
- Lithocolletis salicicolella; Argyromiges salicicolella Sircom, 1848; Lithocolletis brevilineatella Benander, 1946

= Phyllonorycter salicicolella =

Species of moth

Phyllonorycter salicicolella is a moth of the family Gracillariidae. It is known from all of Europe (except the Balkan Peninsula), east to Russia and Japan.

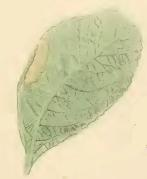
Mined leaf of Salix caprea

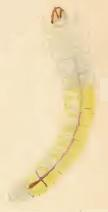
Larva

The wingspan is 7–9 mm. It differs from L.viminetorum as follows: forewings more golden-ochreous, dorsal antemedian spot not reaching basal streak, hindwings rather lighter; the larva whitish-green; dorsal line green.

There are two generations per year with adults on wing in May and again in July and August.

The larvae feed on eared willow (Salix aurita), goat willow (Salix caprea), common sallow (Salix cinerea) and dark-leaved willow (Salix myrsinifolia). They mine the leaves of their host plant.
