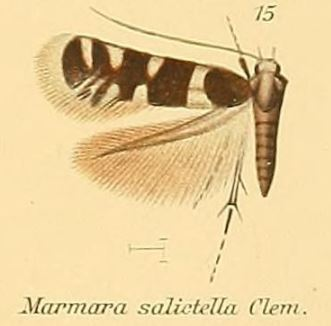
- Marmara salictella

Scientific classification
- Kingdom: Animalia
- Phylum: Arthropoda
- Clade: Pancrustacea
- Class: Insecta
- Order: Lepidoptera
- Family: Gracillariidae
- Subfamily: Marmarinae; Kawahara & Ohshima, 2016

Genera
- Two, see text

= Marmarinae =

Subfamily of moths

Marmarinae is a subfamily of moths described by Akito Yuji Kawahara and Issei Ohshima in 2016.

== Genera ==
In alphabetical order:

- Dendrorycter Kumata, 1978
- Marmara Clemens, 1863
