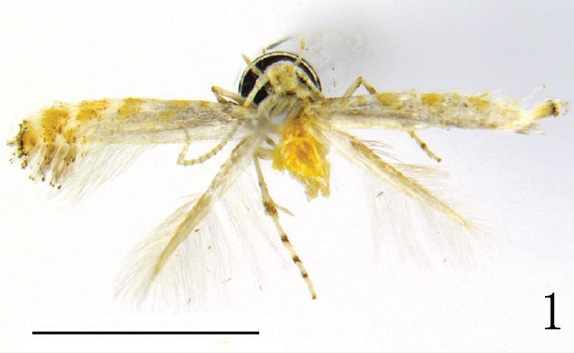

Scientific classification
- Kingdom: Animalia
- Phylum: Arthropoda
- Class: Insecta
- Order: Lepidoptera
- Family: Gracillariidae
- Genus: Eumetriochroa
- Species: E. hiranoi

Binomial name
- Eumetriochroa hiranoi Kumata, 1998

= Eumetriochroa hiranoi =

Species of moth

Eumetriochroa hiranoi is a moth of the family Gracillariidae. It is known from Japan (Honshū and the Ryukyu islands) and China (Jiangxi). It was named in honor of Nagao Hirano.

The wingspan is 4.6–6.1 mm. This species appears very similar to Eumetriochroa kalopanacis but can be distinguished from the latter by differences in the genital structures. The larvae feed on Styrax japonicus. They mine the leaves of their host plant.
