= Marmara gulosa =

Citrus peelminer

Scientific classification
- Kingdom: Animalia
- Phylum: Arthropoda
- Class: Insecta
- Order: Lepidoptera
- Family: Gracillariidae
- Genus: Marmara
- Species: M. gulosa

Binomial name
- Marmara gulosa Guillén & Davis, 2001

Species of moth

Marmara gulosa, the citrus peelminer, is a moth of the family Gracillariidae. It is known from California, Arizona, Texas and Florida in the United States and from Cuba.

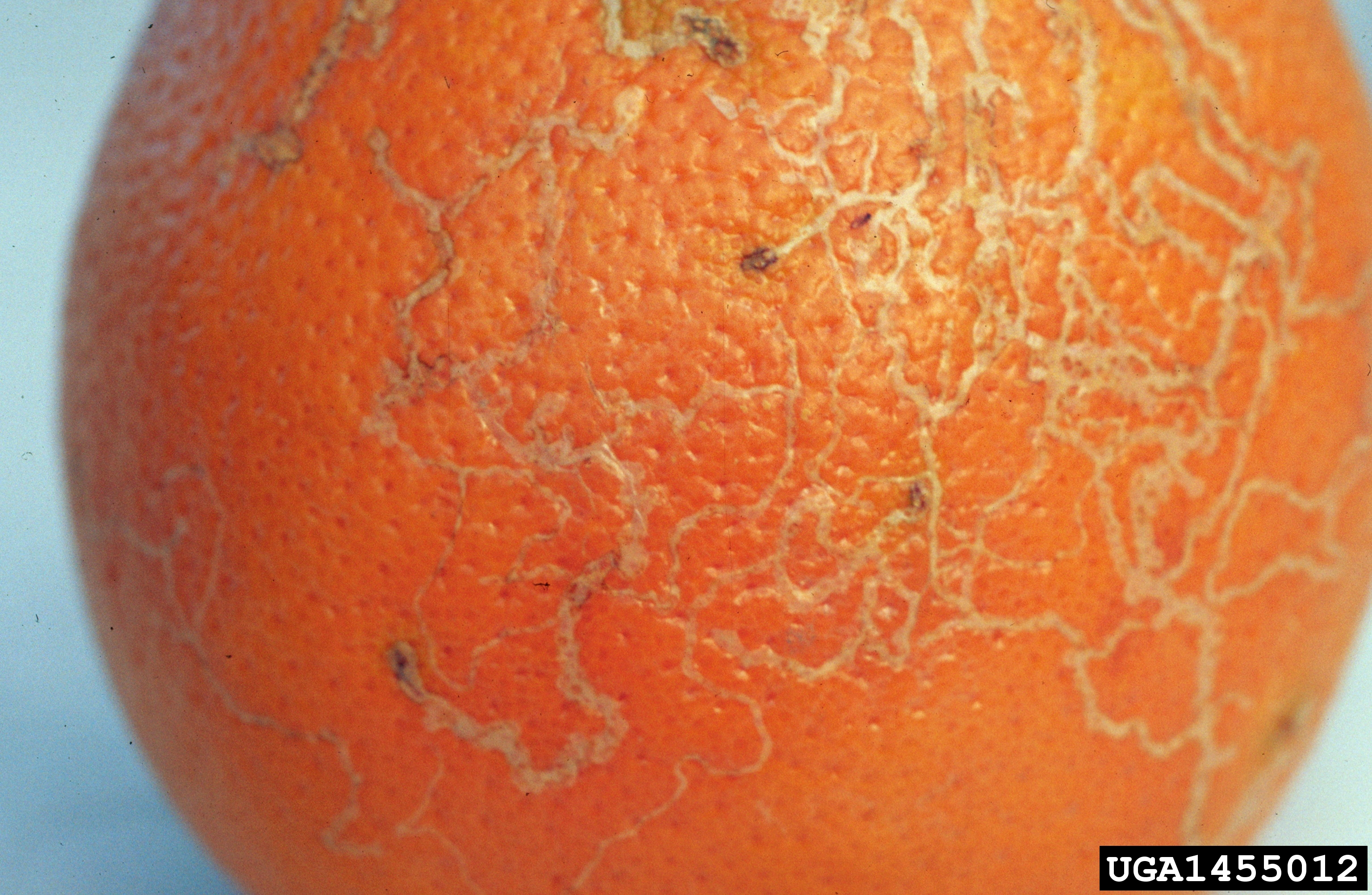
Damage

The larvae feed on Nerium oleander, Citrullus vulgaris, Prosopis, Persea americana, Gossypium hirsutum, Citrus paradisi, Salix lasiolepis and Vitis vinifera.

== Taxonomy ==
A Marmara species feeding on Citrus species was originally identified as Marmara salictella. Later research concluded this species is distinct. It is now known as Marmara gulosa.
