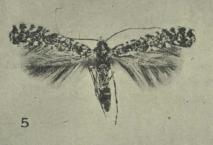

Scientific classification
- Kingdom: Animalia
- Phylum: Arthropoda
- Clade: Pancrustacea
- Class: Insecta
- Order: Lepidoptera
- Family: Gracillariidae
- Genus: Acrocercops
- Species: A. panacicorticis

Binomial name
- Acrocercops panacicorticis (Watt, 1920)

Synonyms
- Parectopa panacicorticis Watt, 1920; Parectopa aethalota; Eumetriochroa panacicorticis (Watt, 1920)

= Acrocercops panacicorticis =

Species of moth

Acrocercops panacicorticis or Eumetriochroa panacicorticis is a moth of the family Gracillariidae. It is endemic to New Zealand. In 2019 Robert Hoare and colleagues proposed that this species be provisionally assigned to the genus Eumetriochroa.

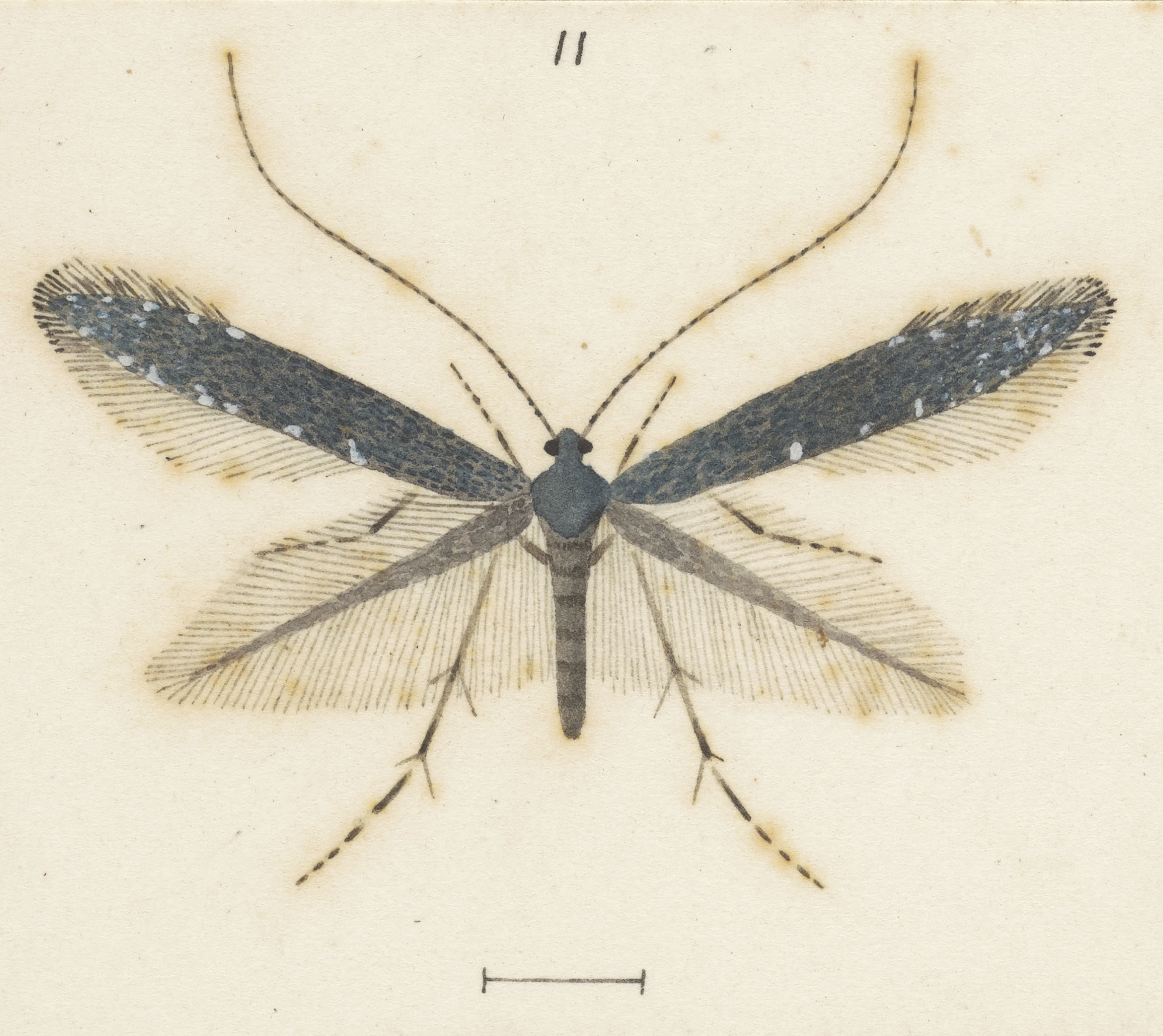
Illustration of A. panacicorticis.

Mine

The wingspan is 7–8 mm.

The larvae feed on Pseudopanax arboreus. They mine the stem of their host plant. The mine is a simple gallery throughout, gradually increasing in width. The general direction is along the young stem in the internodes in its long axis. On reaching a node where the large expanded base of the leaf-stalk closely embraces the greater part of the stem the mine follows the obstruction on a varying distance, eventually turning down into the next internode or retracing its way back in its old internode, turning again in a similar manner on reaching the other extremity. In this way the internodes become more or less occupied by long galleries, while at the nodes the mine may enlarge and envelop the stem. Blind branches are rarely found. The mine may at times become somewhat tortuous, and in places more or less expanded owing to several parts intercommunicating. As a general rule but one internode will be occupied by any one mine, though sometimes a mine may extend into two. Where two mines are occupying the rather small area offered by a single internode, their galleries may intermingle indiscriminately without any attempt at mutual avoidance. The colour of the mine is white at first, later white or a very pale brown. The frass is scanty, and in the earlier portions of the mine occupies a narrow central line in the gallery.
