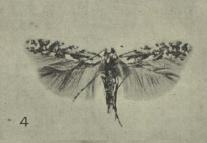

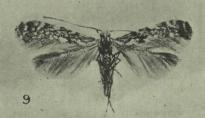
- South Island form

Scientific classification
- Kingdom: Animalia
- Phylum: Arthropoda
- Clade: Pancrustacea
- Class: Insecta
- Order: Lepidoptera
- Family: Gracillariidae
- Genus: Acrocercops
- Species: A. panacivermiforma

Binomial name
- Acrocercops panacivermiforma (Watt, 1920)

Synonyms
- Parectopa panacivermiforma Watt, 1920; Eumetriochroa panacivermiforma (Watt, 1920)

= Acrocercops panacivermiforma =

Species of moth

Acrocercops panacivermiforma or Eumetriochroa panacivermiforma is a moth of the family Gracillariidae. It is endemic to New Zealand. In 2019 Robert Hoare and colleagues proposed that this species be provisionally assigned to the genus Eumetriochroa.

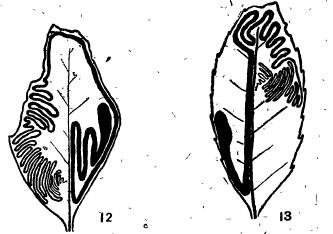
Mine

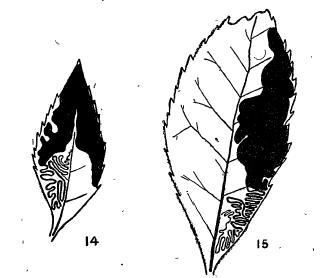
Mine of the South Island Form

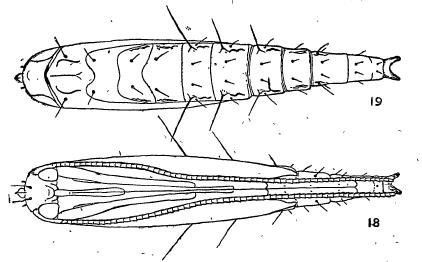
Pupa

The wingspan is about 10 mm (0.39 in). There is a separate South Island form.

The larvae feed on Nothopanax simplex and Nothopanax sinclairii. They mine the leaves of their host plant. The mine has the form of a simple gallery throughout, and is vermiform in character, the loops being very closely applied to one another, but never crossing. As a rule the gallery at first winds backwards and forwards in slightly increasing distances, closely applied to itself, and in a direction more or less parallel to the long axis of the leaf. Then it changes its direction for one almost at right angles to the earlier one, now crossing the leaf in curved sweeps from edge to midrib, this latter forming a certain obstacle to trespass on the other half of the leaf. On reaching the upper region of the leaf the mine becomes less vermiform in character and becomes rather tortuous in its direction, crossing the midrib in its upper and thinner part, and continuing down the other half of the leaf in more or less close proximity to the midrib or outer margin. This latter portion of the mine is often deeper in the leaf than the earlier part. The entire mine is in the upper surface of the leaf, and no trace of it can be seen beneath. The colour of the mine is a paler green than other portions of the leaf. The terminal portion of the gallery may be slightly enlarged, and within it the cocoon is constructed, a small area of the upper cuticle of the leaf at the extreme end of the mine being first prepared to a transparent thinness for the exit of the pupa later. The frass is finely granular, pale in colour, not very abundant, and occupies a rather broad band in the central third of the gallery.

The mine made by the South Island form differs somewhat. In the earlier part the mine is a simple vermiform gallery. Later, however, instead of ending in a somewhat tortuous and widened gallery, it expands into a relatively large blotch, which may occupy the entire leaf, or all or the greater part of one half of the leaf in larger leaves. The entire mine is on the upper surface of the leaf, and is pale green in colour. The midrib forms a barrier in its basal two-thirds. The blotch is irregular in shape, but all irregularities are rounded. The frass is finely granular, black and scanty. Old mines soon become white and conspicuous.
