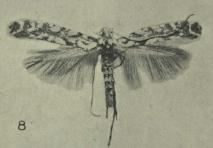

Scientific classification
- Kingdom: Animalia
- Phylum: Arthropoda
- Clade: Pancrustacea
- Class: Insecta
- Order: Lepidoptera
- Family: Gracillariidae
- Genus: Acrocercops
- Species: A. aellomacha

Binomial name
- Acrocercops aellomacha (Meyrick, 1880)

Synonyms
- Gracilaria aellomacha Meyrick, 1880; Parectopa aellomacha (Meyrick, 1880)

= Acrocercops aellomacha =

Species of moth

Acrocercops aellomacha is a moth of the family Gracillariidae, known from New Zealand. The species was first described by Edward Meyrick in 1880 and originally named Gracilaria aellomacha. In 2019 Robert Hoare proposed that this species be provisionally assigned to the genus Eumetriochroa. However as this proposal needs further investigation this species is also currently known as Eumetriochroa (s.l.) aellomacha.

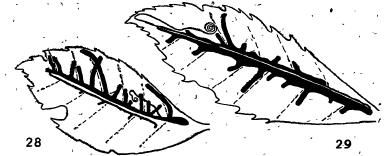

The wingspan is 7–9 mm.

The host plant for the species is Pseudopanax arboreus. They mine the leaves of their host plant. The larva, on hatching, at once mines into the leaf through the shell of the egg, and as a general rule takes several spiral turns before mining in any definite direction. The mine throughout is a very gradually widening gallery, never becoming blotched, and rarely do portions cross each other except in the smaller leaves. Its direction invariably takes it along both sides of the midrib, this obstacle being crossed in its upper and thinner part. From these long straight portions a varying number of blind arms or branches of varying lengths, mostly straight but sometimes slightly curved, sprout out into the leaf. As a rule the greater number will be confined to one half of the leaf. These blind branches sometimes follow the course of the veins of the leaf, but most often do not, generally treating these as no obstacle. They do not often reach as far as the outer margin of the leaf, but may do so, and may follow it a short distance. These branches are all more or less parallel to one another, and rarely cross. The mine is found only in the younger leaves, and is pale green in colour, the tips of the branches often being white, showing where the larva came close against the upper cuticle. Old mines become white, but otherwise do not discolour the leaf. The frass is very finely granular.
