= Chilocampyla psidiella =

Scientific classification
- Kingdom: Animalia
- Phylum: Arthropoda
- Class: Insecta
- Order: Lepidoptera
- Family: Gracillariidae
- Genus: Chilocampyla
- Species: C. psidiella

Binomial name
- Chilocampyla psidiella Busck, 1934

Species of moth

Chilocampyla psidiella is a moth of the family Gracillariidae. It is known from Cuba.

The larvae feed on Eugenia axillaris, Psidium guajava and Psidium guineense. They mine the leaves of their host plant.
