= Callicercopinae =

Scientific classification
- Kingdom: Animalia
- Phylum: Arthropoda
- Clade: Pancrustacea
- Class: Insecta
- Order: Lepidoptera
- Family: Gracillariidae
- Subfamily: Callicercopinae; Li, Ohshima & Kawahara, 2022

Genera
- Callicercops

Subfamily of moths

Callicercopinae are a subfamily of moths which was described by Li, Ohshima & Kawahara in 2022.

== Genus ==
- Callicercops Vári, 1961
