= Psydrocercops =

Scientific classification
- Kingdom: Animalia
- Phylum: Arthropoda
- Class: Insecta
- Order: Lepidoptera
- Family: Gracillariidae
- Subfamily: Acrocercopinae
- Genus: Psydrocercops; Kumata & Kuroko, 1988

Species
- See text

Genus of moths

Psydrocercops is a genus of moths in the family Gracillariidae.

== Species ==
- Psydrocercops wisteriae (Kuroko, 1982)
