= Leucocercops =

Scientific classification
- Kingdom: Animalia
- Phylum: Arthropoda
- Class: Insecta
- Order: Lepidoptera
- Family: Gracillariidae
- Subfamily: Acrocercopinae
- Genus: Leucocercops; Vári, 1961

Species
- See text

Genus of moths

Leucocercops is a genus of moths in the family Gracillariidae.

== Species ==
- Leucocercops dasmophora (Meyrick, 1908)
