= Marmara pomonella =

Scientific classification
- Domain: Eukaryota
- Kingdom: Animalia
- Phylum: Arthropoda
- Class: Insecta
- Order: Lepidoptera
- Family: Gracillariidae
- Genus: Marmara
- Species: M. pomonella

Binomial name
- Marmara pomonella Busck, 1915

Species of moth

Marmara pomonella, the apple fruitminer, is a moth of the family Gracillariidae. It is known from Canada and the United States (Oregon and Maine).

The larvae feed on Malus species (including Malus pumila and Malus sylvestris) and Pyrus species.
