= Marmara habecki =

Scientific classification
- Kingdom: Animalia
- Phylum: Arthropoda
- Clade: Pancrustacea
- Class: Insecta
- Order: Lepidoptera
- Family: Gracillariidae
- Genus: Marmara
- Species: M. habecki

Binomial name
- Marmara habecki Davis, 2011

Species of moth

Marmara habecki is a moth of the family Gracillariidae. It is found in Florida, United States.

The larvae feed on Schinus terebinthifolia. They mine the leaves of their host plant.
