= Hypectopa ornithograpta =

Scientific classification
- Domain: Eukaryota
- Kingdom: Animalia
- Phylum: Arthropoda
- Class: Insecta
- Order: Lepidoptera
- Family: Gracillariidae
- Genus: Hypectopa
- Species: H. ornithograpta

Binomial name
- Hypectopa ornithograpta Diakonoff, 1955

Species of moth

Hypectopa ornithograpta is a moth of the family Gracillariidae. It is known from Papua New Guinea.
