= Marmara corticola =

Scientific classification
- Domain: Eukaryota
- Kingdom: Animalia
- Phylum: Arthropoda
- Class: Insecta
- Order: Lepidoptera
- Family: Gracillariidae
- Genus: Marmara
- Species: M. corticola

Binomial name
- Marmara corticola Fitzgerald, 1973

Species of moth

Marmara corticola is a moth of the family Gracillariidae. It is known from Québec, Canada, and New York and Vermont, in the United States.

The larvae feed on Fraxinus pennsylvanica. They mine in the stem of their host plant.
