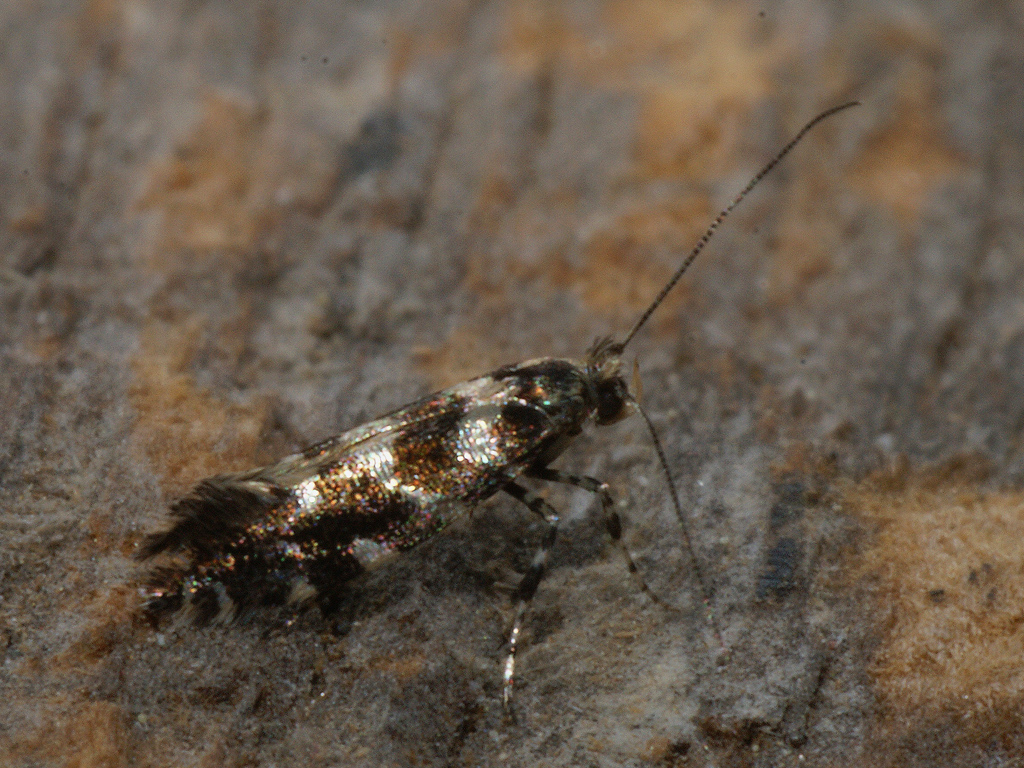

Scientific classification
- Domain: Eukaryota
- Kingdom: Animalia
- Phylum: Arthropoda
- Class: Insecta
- Order: Lepidoptera
- Family: Gracillariidae
- Genus: Callisto
- Species: C. insperatella

Binomial name
- Callisto insperatella (Nickerl, 1864)

Synonyms
- Ornix insperatella Nickerl, 1864

= Callisto insperatella =

Species of moth

Callisto insperatella is a moth of the family Gracillariidae. It is found from Fennoscandia to Switzerland, Austria, and Ukraine.

The larvae feed on Prunus cerasus and Prunus padus. They mine the leaves of their host plant.
