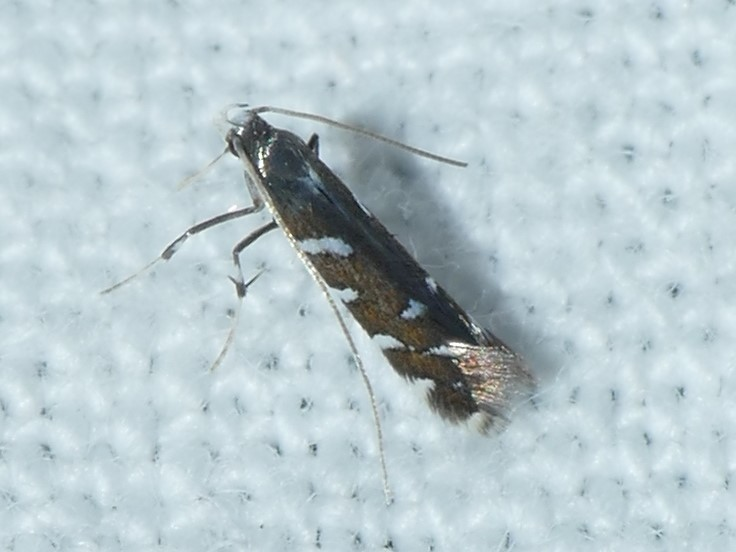

Scientific classification
- Kingdom: Animalia
- Phylum: Arthropoda
- Class: Insecta
- Order: Lepidoptera
- Family: Gracillariidae
- Genus: Sauterina
- Species: S. hofmanniella

Binomial name
- Sauterina hofmanniella (Schleich, 1867)

Synonyms
- Gracilaria hofmanniella Schleich, 1867

= Sauterina hofmanniella =

Species of moth

Sauterina hofmanniella is a species of moth in the family Gracillariidae. It is found from Scandinavia to the Pyrenees, Sardinia, Italy and Romania and from France to central Russia.

The larvae feed on Lathyrus niger. They mine the leaves of their host plant.
