= Marmara basidendroca =

Scientific classification
- Domain: Eukaryota
- Kingdom: Animalia
- Phylum: Arthropoda
- Class: Insecta
- Order: Lepidoptera
- Family: Gracillariidae
- Genus: Marmara
- Species: M. basidendroca

Binomial name
- Marmara basidendroca Fitzgerald, 1973

Species of moth

Marmara basidendroca is a moth of the family Gracillariidae. It is known from the New York, United States.

The larvae feed on Fraxinus pennsylvanica. They mine in the stem of their host plant. They are restricted to the main stem at the base of the tree and the root collar.
