= Marmara isortha =

Scientific classification
- Kingdom: Animalia
- Phylum: Arthropoda
- Class: Insecta
- Order: Lepidoptera
- Family: Gracillariidae
- Genus: Marmara
- Species: M. isortha

Binomial name
- Marmara isortha (Meyrick, 1915)

Species of moth

Marmara isortha is a moth of the family Gracillariidae. It is known from Guyana, Brazil and India.

The larvae feed on Theobroma cacao. They mine the fruit of their host plant.
