= Amblyptila =

Scientific classification
- Kingdom: Animalia
- Phylum: Arthropoda
- Class: Insecta
- Order: Lepidoptera
- Family: Gracillariidae
- Subfamily: Acrocercopinae
- Genus: Amblyptila; Vári, 1961

Species
- See text

Genus of moths

Amblyptila is a genus of moths in the family Gracillariidae.

== Species ==
- Amblyptila cynanchi Vári, 1961
- Amblyptila strophanthina Vári, 1961
