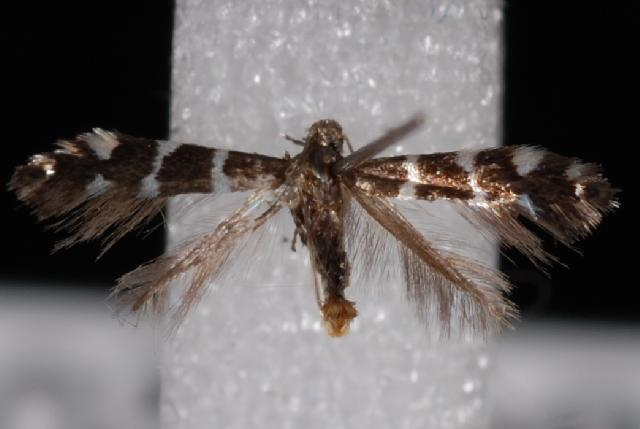

Scientific classification
- Domain: Eukaryota
- Kingdom: Animalia
- Phylum: Arthropoda
- Class: Insecta
- Order: Lepidoptera
- Family: Gracillariidae
- Genus: Marmara
- Species: M. arbutiella

Binomial name
- Marmara arbutiella Busck, 1904

= Marmara arbutiella =

Species of moth

Marmara arbutiella is a moth of the family Gracillariidae. It is known from Canada and the United States (Oregon, Washington and California).

The larvae feed on Arbutus menziesii, Arbutus unedo and Arctostaphylos species. They mine the leaves of their host plant.
