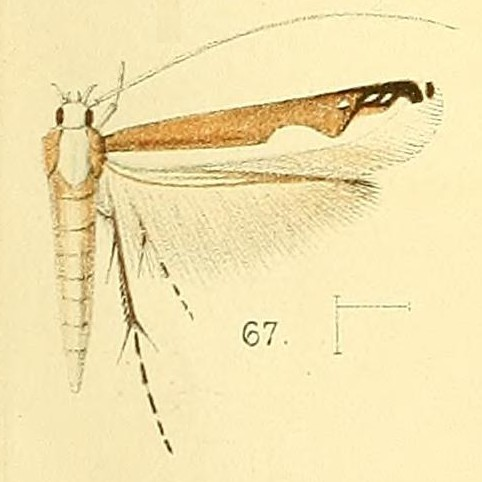

Scientific classification
- Domain: Eukaryota
- Kingdom: Animalia
- Phylum: Arthropoda
- Class: Insecta
- Order: Lepidoptera
- Family: Gracillariidae
- Genus: Lamprolectica
- Species: L. apicistrigata

Binomial name
- Lamprolectica apicistrigata (Walsingham, 1891)

Synonyms
- Gracilaria apicistrigata Walsingham, 1891

= Lamprolectica apicistrigata =

Species of moth

Lamprolectica apicistrigata is a moth of the family Gracillariidae. It is found in South Africa, Nigeria and Gambia.

The larvae feed on Deinbollia oblongifolia. They probably mine the leaves of their host plant.
