= Callisto pfaffenzelleri =

Scientific classification
- Kingdom: Animalia
- Phylum: Arthropoda
- Class: Insecta
- Order: Lepidoptera
- Family: Gracillariidae
- Genus: Callisto
- Species: C. pfaffenzelleri

Binomial name
- Callisto pfaffenzelleri (Frey, 1856)

Synonyms
- Ornix pfaffenzelleri Frey, 1856

Species of moth

Callisto pfaffenzelleri is a moth of the family Gracillariidae. It is known from the Alps and Slovenia.

The larvae feed on Amelanchier, Cotoneaster integerrimus, and Sorbus species.
