= Psydrocercops wisteriae =

Scientific classification
- Kingdom: Animalia
- Phylum: Arthropoda
- Class: Insecta
- Order: Lepidoptera
- Family: Gracillariidae
- Genus: Psydrocercops
- Species: P. wisteriae

Binomial name
- Psydrocercops wisteriae (Kuroko, 1982)

Synonyms
- Acrocercops wisteriae Kuroko, 1982

Species of moth

Psydrocercops wisteriae is a moth of the family Gracillariidae. It is known from China (Beijing), Hong Kong, Japan (Honshū, Kyūshū, Shikoku) and the Russian Far East.

The wingspan is 6–9 mm.

The larvae feed on Wisteria floribunda. They mine the leaves of their host plant.
