= Eumetriochroa miyatai =

Scientific classification
- Kingdom: Animalia
- Phylum: Arthropoda
- Class: Insecta
- Order: Lepidoptera
- Family: Gracillariidae
- Genus: Eumetriochroa
- Species: E. miyatai

Binomial name
- Eumetriochroa miyatai Kumata, 1998

Species of moth

Eumetriochroa miyatai is a moth of the family Gracillariidae. It is known from all the four main islands of Japan (Hokkaidō, Honshū, Shikoku, and Kyūshū).

The wingspan is 6.1–9 mm for the vernal (spring) form and 5.7–6.9 mm for the aestival (summer) form. The larvae feed on Ilex species, including Ilex crenata, Ilex rotundata, and Ilex pedunculosa. They mine the leaves of their host plant.
