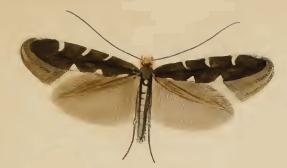
- Callisto denticulella

Scientific classification
- Domain: Eukaryota
- Kingdom: Animalia
- Phylum: Arthropoda
- Class: Insecta
- Order: Lepidoptera
- Family: Gracillariidae
- Subfamily: Parornichinae
- Genus: Callisto; Stephens, 1834

Species
- See text

Synonyms
- Annickia Gibeaux, 1990

= Callisto (moth) =

Genus of moths

Callisto is a genus of moths in the family Gracillariidae.

== Species ==
- Callisto albicinctella Kuznetzov, 1979
- Callisto basistrigella Huemer, Deutsch & Triberti, 2015
- Callisto coffeella (Zetterstedt, 1839)
- Callisto denticulella (Thunberg, 1794)
- Callisto elegantella Kuznetzov, 1979
- Callisto insperatella (Nickerl, 1864)
- Callisto pfaffenzelleri (Frey, 1856)
