= Guttigera schefflerella =

Scientific classification
- Domain: Eukaryota
- Kingdom: Animalia
- Phylum: Arthropoda
- Class: Insecta
- Order: Lepidoptera
- Family: Gracillariidae
- Genus: Guttigera
- Species: G. schefflerella

Binomial name
- Guttigera schefflerella Kobayashi, Huang & Hirowatari, 2013

Species of moth

Guttigera schefflerella is a moth of the family Gracillariidae. It is found in the Ryukyu Islands of Japan (Amami Ōshima and Ishigaki Island).

The wingspan is 6.1–8.1 mm. There are multiple generations per year. The larvae feed on Heptapleurum heptaphyllum. They mine the leaves of their host plant.

== Etymology ==
The specific name is derived from Schefflera, the (former) generic name of the host plant.
