= Marmara oregonensis =

Scientific classification
- Kingdom: Animalia
- Phylum: Arthropoda
- Class: Insecta
- Order: Lepidoptera
- Family: Gracillariidae
- Genus: Marmara
- Species: M. oregonensis

Binomial name
- Marmara oregonensis Fitzgerald, 1975

Species of moth

Marmara oregonensis is a moth of the family Gracillariidae. It is known from Oregon, United States to British Columbia, Canada in western North America.

The larvae feed on Abies grandis and Pseudotsuga menziesii. They mine the stem of their host plant.
