= Eumetriochroa araliella =

Scientific classification
- Domain: Eukaryota
- Kingdom: Animalia
- Phylum: Arthropoda
- Class: Insecta
- Order: Lepidoptera
- Family: Gracillariidae
- Genus: Eumetriochroa
- Species: E. araliella

Binomial name
- Eumetriochroa araliella Kobayashi, Huang & Hirowatari, 2013

Species of moth

Eumetriochroa araliella is a moth of the family Gracillariidae. It is found in Japan (Mie, Nara, Fukuoka, Kagoshima (Amami Islands) prefectures) and Korea.

The wingspan is 5–8.1 mm. The larvae feed on various species in the family Araliaceae: Dendropanax trifidus, Eleutherococcus sciadophylloides, Evodiopanax innovans, and Fatsia japonica, mining the leaves of their host plants.

== Etymology ==
The specific name refers to the family of the host plants, Araliaceae.
