= Marmara affirmata =

Scientific classification
- Kingdom: Animalia
- Phylum: Arthropoda
- Class: Insecta
- Order: Lepidoptera
- Family: Gracillariidae
- Genus: Marmara
- Species: M. affirmata

Binomial name
- Marmara affirmata (Meyrick, 1918)

Species of moth

Marmara affirmata is a moth of the family Gracillariidae. It is known from Peru.
