= Callicercops triceros =

Scientific classification
- Kingdom: Animalia
- Phylum: Arthropoda
- Clade: Pancrustacea
- Class: Insecta
- Order: Lepidoptera
- Family: Gracillariidae
- Genus: Callicercops
- Species: C. triceros

Binomial name
- Callicercops triceros (Meyrick, 1926)

Synonyms
- Acrocercops triceros Meyrick, 1926; Acrocercops triactis Meyrick, 1930; Callicercops triactis (Meyrick, 1930)

Species of moth

Callicercops triceros is a moth of the family Gracillariidae. It is known from Mauritius, Namibia, Réunion, Zambia, Zimbabwe and South Africa.

Hostplant of this species is Bauhinia monandra (Fabaceae).
