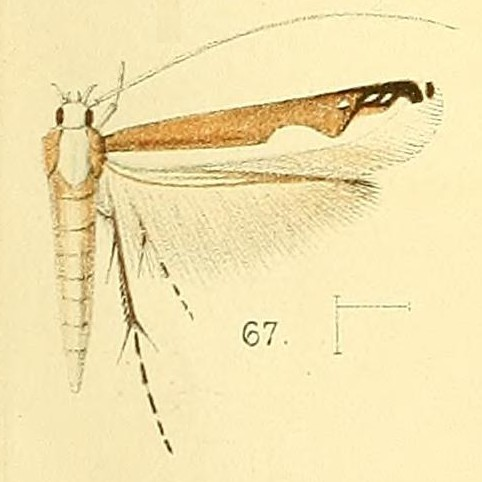
- Lamprolectica apicistrigata

Scientific classification
- Domain: Eukaryota
- Kingdom: Animalia
- Phylum: Arthropoda
- Class: Insecta
- Order: Lepidoptera
- Family: Gracillariidae
- Subfamily: Acrocercopinae
- Genus: Lamprolectica; Vári, 1961

Species
- See text

= Lamprolectica =

Genus of moths

Lamprolectica is a genus of moths in the family Gracillariidae.

== Species ==
- Lamprolectica apicistrigata (Walsingham, 1891)
