= Marmara phaneropis =

Scientific classification
- Kingdom: Animalia
- Phylum: Arthropoda
- Class: Insecta
- Order: Lepidoptera
- Family: Gracillariidae
- Genus: Marmara
- Species: M. phaneropis

Binomial name
- Marmara phaneropis (Meyrick, 1915)

Species of moth

Marmara phaneropis is a moth of the family Gracillariidae. It is known from Ecuador.
