= Amblyptila cynanchi =

Scientific classification
- Kingdom: Animalia
- Phylum: Arthropoda
- Class: Insecta
- Order: Lepidoptera
- Family: Gracillariidae
- Genus: Amblyptila
- Species: A. cynanchi

Binomial name
- Amblyptila cynanchi Vári, 1961

Species of moth

Amblyptila cynanchi is a moth of the family Gracillariidae. It is known from South Africa.

The larvae feed on Cynanchum ellipticum and Cynanchum obtusifolium. They mine the leaves of their host plant.
