= Marmara elotella =

Scientific classification
- Domain: Eukaryota
- Kingdom: Animalia
- Phylum: Arthropoda
- Class: Insecta
- Order: Lepidoptera
- Family: Gracillariidae
- Genus: Marmara
- Species: M. elotella

Binomial name
- Marmara elotella (Busck, 1909)

Species of moth

Marmara elotella, the apple barkminer, is a moth of the family Gracillariidae. It is known from Massachusetts, Connecticut, Kentucky, Maine and Virginia in the United States.

The larvae feed on Pyrus and Malus species, including Malus pumila and Malus sylvestris. They mine the twigs of their host plant. The larvae are sap feeders.
