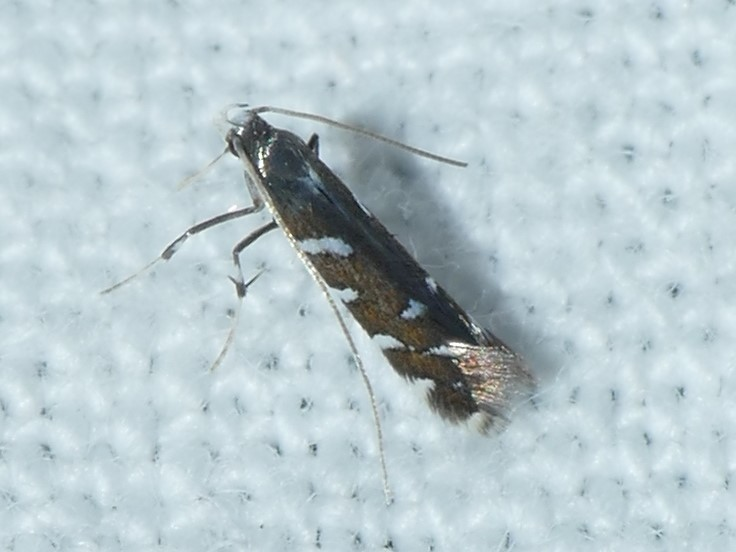
- Sauterina hofmanniella

Scientific classification
- Kingdom: Animalia
- Phylum: Arthropoda
- Class: Insecta
- Order: Lepidoptera
- Family: Gracillariidae
- Subfamily: Acrocercopinae
- Genus: Sauterina; Kuznetzov, 1979

Species
- 3 species (see text)

= Sauterina =

Genus of moths

Sauterina is a genus of moths in the family Gracillariidae.

== Species ==
There are three recognized species:

- Sauterina hexameris (Meyrick, 1921)
- Sauterina hofmanniella (Schleich, 1867)
- Sauterina phiaropis (Meyrick, 1921)
