= Marmara fulgidella =

Scientific classification
- Kingdom: Animalia
- Phylum: Arthropoda
- Clade: Pancrustacea
- Class: Insecta
- Order: Lepidoptera
- Family: Gracillariidae
- Genus: Marmara
- Species: M. fulgidella

Binomial name
- Marmara fulgidella (Clemens, 1860)

Species of moth

Marmara fulgidella is a moth of the family Gracillariidae. It is known from the United States (including Pennsylvania).

The larvae feed on Castanea and Quercus species, including Quercus prinus.
