= Vihualpenia =

Scientific classification
- Kingdom: Animalia
- Phylum: Arthropoda
- Class: Insecta
- Order: Lepidoptera
- Family: Gracillariidae
- Subfamily: Acrocercopinae
- Genus: Vihualpenia; Mundaca, Parra & Vargas, 2013
- Species: V. lithraeophaga

Binomial name
- Vihualpenia lithraeophaga (Mundaca, Parra & Vargas, 2013)

Synonyms
- Hualpenia Mundaca, Parra & Vargas, 2013 (preocc.); Hualpenia lithraeophaga Mundaca, Parra & Vargas, 2013

Genus of moths

Vihualpenia is a genus of moths in the family Gracillariidae. It contains only one species, Vihualpenia lithraeophaga, which is found in southern central Chile.

The length of the forewings is 1.0–1.1 mm .
