= Marmara serotinella =

Scientific classification
- Domain: Eukaryota
- Kingdom: Animalia
- Phylum: Arthropoda
- Class: Insecta
- Order: Lepidoptera
- Family: Gracillariidae
- Genus: Marmara
- Species: M. serotinella

Binomial name
- Marmara serotinella Busck, 1915

Species of moth

Marmara serotinella is a moth of the family Gracillariidae. It is known from Virginia, Maine, and Massachusetts in the United States. The larvae are leaf miners of black cherry.
