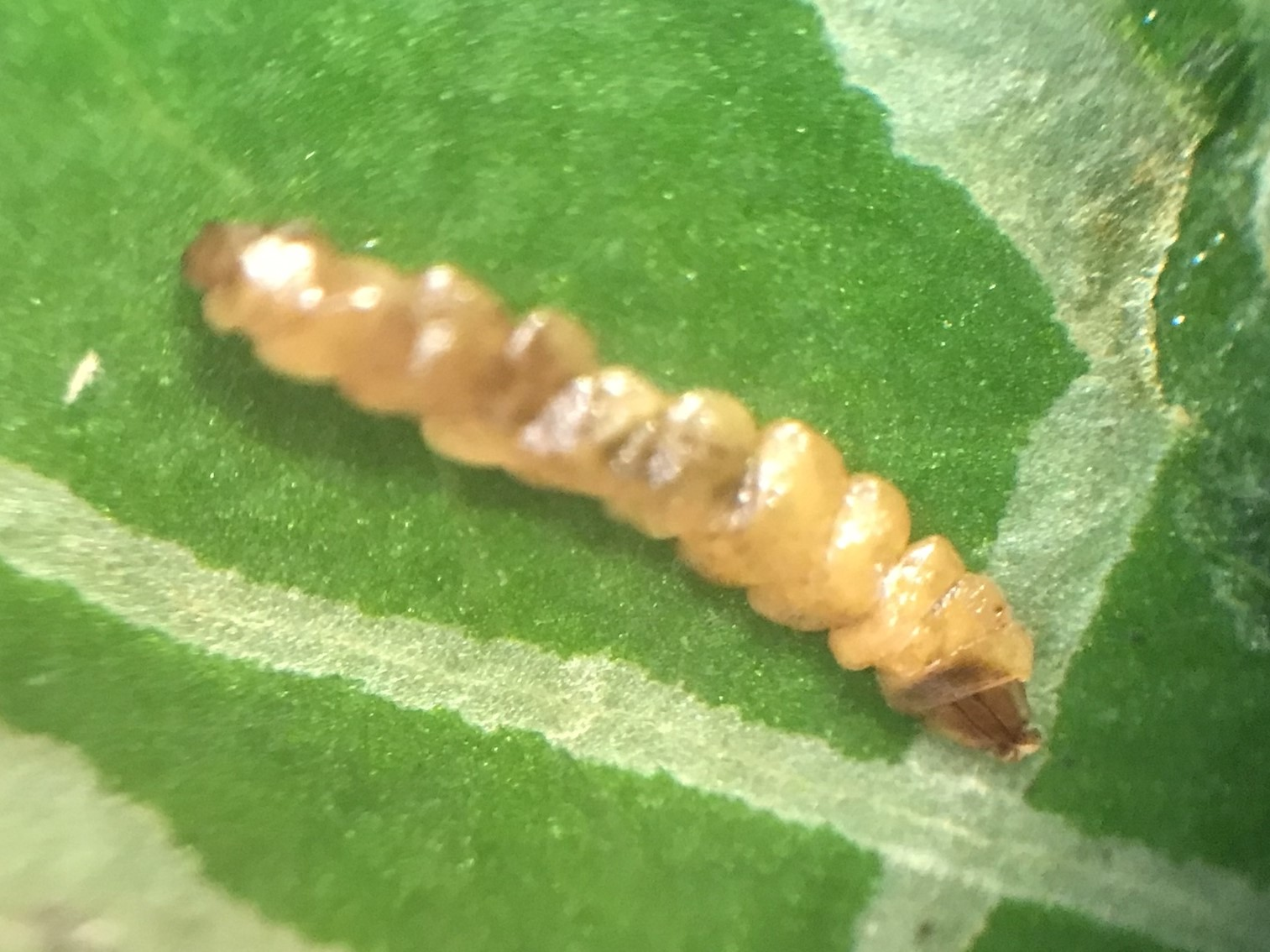
- Larva and leaf mines

Scientific classification
- Kingdom: Animalia
- Phylum: Arthropoda
- Clade: Pancrustacea
- Class: Insecta
- Order: Lepidoptera
- Family: Gracillariidae
- Genus: Marmara
- Species: M. smilacisella

Binomial name
- Marmara smilacisella (Chambers, 1875)

Synonyms
- Phyllocnistis smilacisella Chambers, 1875; Marmara similiacicella Dyar, [1903]; Marmara smilaciella Meyrick, 1912

= Marmara smilacisella =

Species of moth

Marmara smilacisella is a species of moth of the family Gracillariidae. It is known from the United States (Kentucky and Ohio south to Florida and Texas).

The larvae feed on Smilax glabra, Smilax glauca and Smilax hispida.
