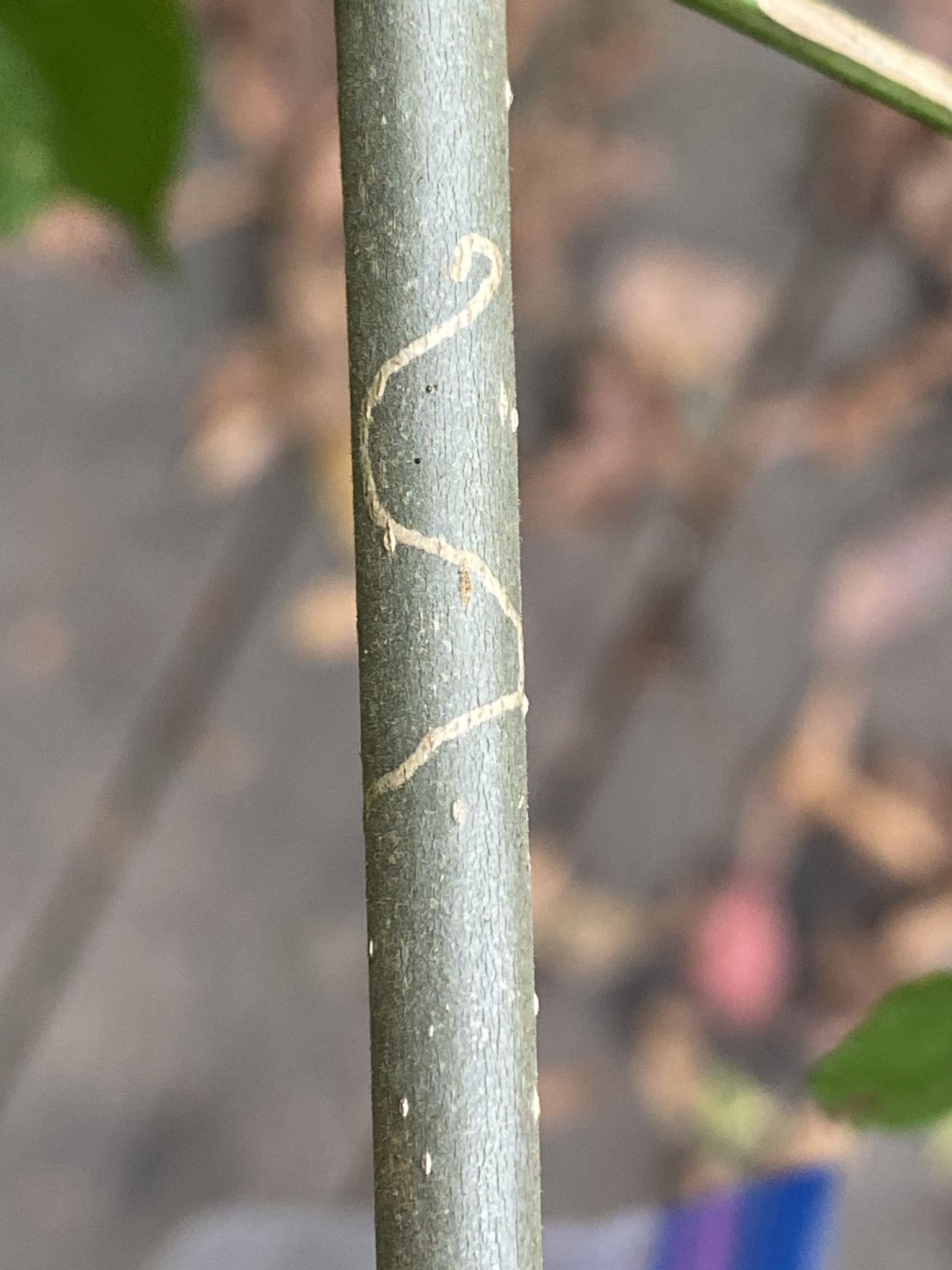
- Stem mine on ash

Scientific classification
- Kingdom: Animalia
- Phylum: Arthropoda
- Class: Insecta
- Order: Lepidoptera
- Family: Gracillariidae
- Genus: Marmara
- Species: M. fraxinicola

Binomial name
- Marmara fraxinicola Braun, 1922

= Marmara fraxinicola =

Species of moth

Marmara fraxinicola is a moth of the family Gracillariidae. It is known from Québec, Canada, and Ohio, Vermont and New York in the United States.

There is one generation per year.

The larvae feed on Fraxinus americana and Fraxinus pennsylvanica. They mine in the stem of their host plant.
