= Callicercops iridocrossa =

Scientific classification
- Kingdom: Animalia
- Phylum: Arthropoda
- Class: Insecta
- Order: Lepidoptera
- Family: Gracillariidae
- Genus: Callicercops
- Species: C. iridocrossa

Binomial name
- Callicercops iridocrossa (Meyrick, 1938)

Synonyms
- Callicercops yakusimensis Kumata & Kuroko, 1988

Species of moth

Callicercops iridocrossa is a moth of the family Gracillariidae. It is known from China (Yunnan, Sichuan, Hong Kong) and Japan (the Ryukyu Islands). The wingspan is 9.2–11.8 millimetres (0.36–0.46 in). The larvae feed on Bauhinia japonica. They probably mine the leaves of their host plant.
