= Callisto elegantella =

Scientific classification
- Domain: Eukaryota
- Kingdom: Animalia
- Phylum: Arthropoda
- Class: Insecta
- Order: Lepidoptera
- Family: Gracillariidae
- Genus: Callisto
- Species: C. elegantella

Binomial name
- Callisto elegantella Kuznetzov, 1979

Species of moth

Callisto elegantella is a moth of the family Gracillariidae. It is known from the Russian Far East.
