= Marmara opuntiella =

Scientific classification
- Domain: Eukaryota
- Kingdom: Animalia
- Phylum: Arthropoda
- Class: Insecta
- Order: Lepidoptera
- Family: Gracillariidae
- Genus: Marmara
- Species: M. opuntiella

Binomial name
- Marmara opuntiella Busck, 1907

Species of moth

Marmara opuntiella is a moth of the family Gracillariidae. It is known from Texas in the United States and from Mexico. There are records of similar larvae with identical habits from Colombia, Cuba, Ecuador, El Salvador, Guatemala, Haiti, Honduras, Peru and Venezuela, and these may also refer to this species.

The larvae feed on Nopalea and Opuntia species. They mine the leaves of their host plant.
