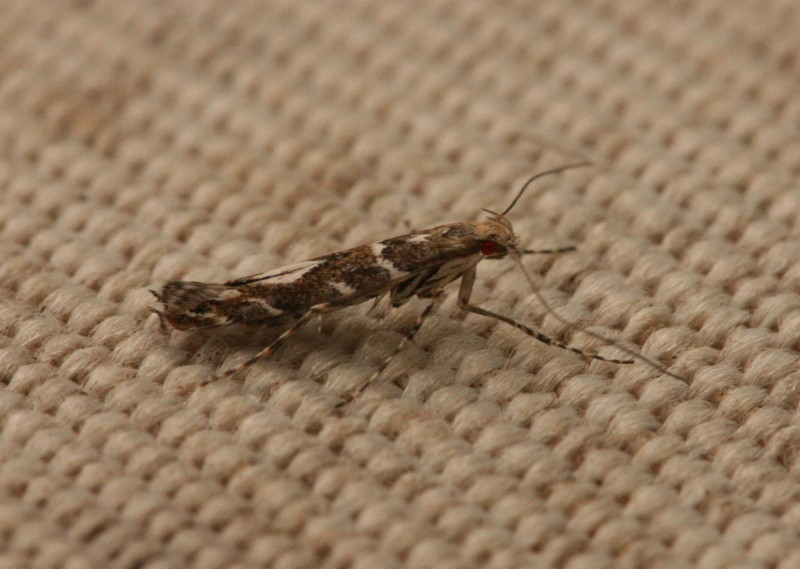
- Acrocercops brongniardella

Scientific classification
- Kingdom: Animalia
- Phylum: Arthropoda
- Clade: Pancrustacea
- Class: Insecta
- Order: Lepidoptera
- Family: Gracillariidae
- Subfamily: Acrocercopinae; Kawahara & Ohshima, 2016

Genera
- 28, see text

= Acrocercopinae =

Subfamily of moths

Acrocercopinae is a subfamily of moths described by Akito Yuji Kawahara and Issei Ohshima in 2016.

== Genera ==
In alphabetical order:

- Acrocercops Wallengren, 1881
- Amblyptila Vári, 1961
- Artifodina Kumata, 1985
- Borboryctis Kumata & Kuroko, 1988
- Chilocampyla Busck, 1900
- Chrysocercops Kumata & Kuroko, 1988
- Corethrovalva Vári, 1961
- Cryptolectica Vári, 1961
- Dekeidoryxis Kumata, 1989
- Deoptilia Kumata & Kuroko, 1988
- Dialectica Walsingham, 1897
- Eteoryctis Kumata & Kuroko, 1988
- Eucosmophora Walsingham, 1897
- Gibbovalva Kumata & Kuroko, 1988
- Hypectopa Diakonoff, 1955
- Lamprolectica Vári, 1961
- Leucocercops Vári, 1961
- Melanocercops Kumata & Kuroko, 1988
- Leucospilapteryx Spuler, 1910
- Metacercops Vári, 1961
- Monocercops Kumata, 1989
- Phodoryctis Kumata & Kuroko, 1988
- Psydrocercops Kumata & Kuroko, 1988
- Sauterina Kuznetzov, 1979
- Schedocercops Vári, 1961
- Spulerina Vári, 1961
- Telamoptilia Kumata & Kuroko, 1988
- Vihualpenia Mundaca, Parra & Vargas, 2013
