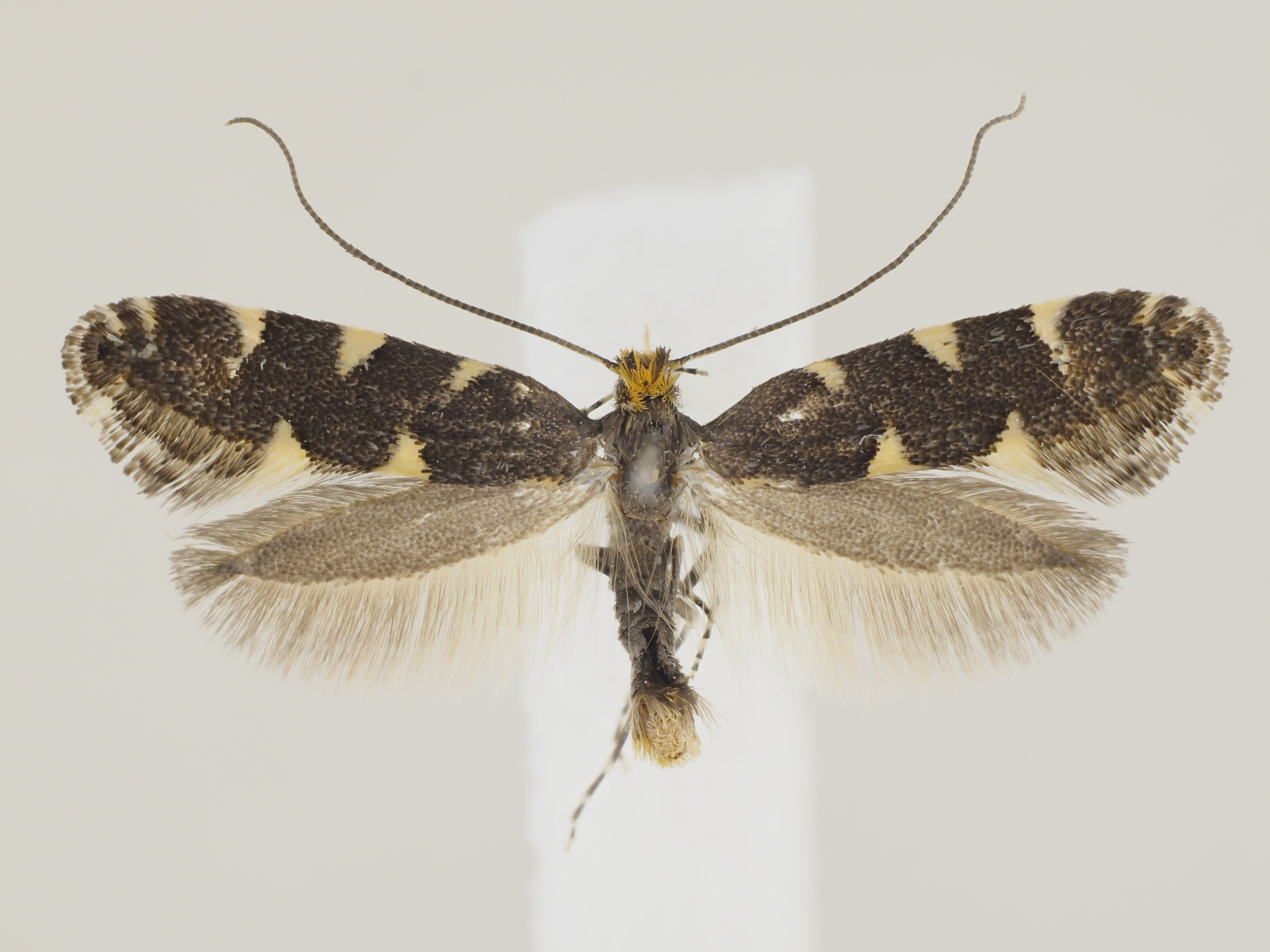

Scientific classification
- Domain: Eukaryota
- Kingdom: Animalia
- Phylum: Arthropoda
- Class: Insecta
- Order: Lepidoptera
- Family: Gracillariidae
- Genus: Callisto
- Species: C. denticulella

Binomial name
- Callisto denticulella (Thunberg, 1794)

Synonyms
- Ornix guttea (Haworth, 1828); Ornix guttea var. solitariella Dietz, 1907; Parornix solitariella; Ornix solitariella; Ornix guttella Doubleday, 1859; Oecophora guttiferella Duponchel, 1840; Tinea gyllenhalella Thunberg, 1794; Tinea malinella Hübner, 1813; Oecophora marginimaculella Eversmann, 1844

= Callisto denticulella =

Species of moth

Callisto denticulella is a moth of the family Gracillariidae. It is found in most of Europe, except the Balkan Peninsula and islands in the Mediterranean Sea. It is also known in Canada (Québec and Nova Scotia) and the United States (Vermont, Maryland and New Hampshire).

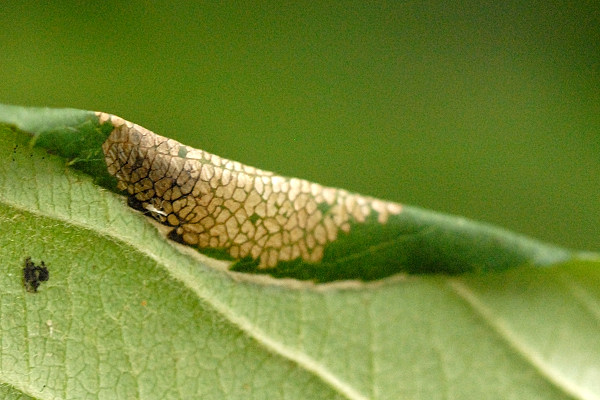
Larval mine

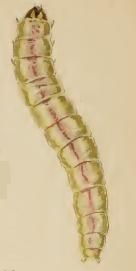
Larva

The wingspan is about 11 mm.The head is orange brown. The forewing has evenly brown ground colour. There are three white triangular striae at the costa and 2 small striae near the apex. The inner margin has a white dot at the base and two triangular striae, one in the middle of the inner margin, the other at 2/3.

Adults are on wing from May to June.

Young larvae mine the leaves of Malus species. Other recorded food plants are Cotoneaster, Crataegus and Pyrus communis.
