= Marmara auratella =

Scientific classification
- Kingdom: Animalia
- Phylum: Arthropoda
- Class: Insecta
- Order: Lepidoptera
- Family: Gracillariidae
- Genus: Marmara
- Species: M. auratella

Binomial name
- Marmara auratella Braun, 1915

Species of moth

Marmara auratella is a moth of the family Gracillariidae. It is known from the United States (Ohio and Maine).

The larvae feed on Dahlia species and Rudbeckia laciniata. They mine the stem of their host plant. The mine has the form of a long serpentine mine on the stem.
