= Guttigera rhythmica =

Scientific classification
- Kingdom: Animalia
- Phylum: Arthropoda
- Clade: Pancrustacea
- Class: Insecta
- Order: Lepidoptera
- Family: Gracillariidae
- Genus: Guttigera
- Species: G. rhythmica

Binomial name
- Guttigera rhythmica Diakonoff, 1955

Species of moth

Guttigera rhythmica is a moth of the family Gracillariidae. It is known from Papua New Guinea.
