= Marmara apocynella =

Scientific classification
- Domain: Eukaryota
- Kingdom: Animalia
- Phylum: Arthropoda
- Class: Insecta
- Order: Lepidoptera
- Family: Gracillariidae
- Genus: Marmara
- Species: M. apocynella

Binomial name
- Marmara apocynella Braun, 1915

Species of moth

Marmara apocynella is a moth of the family Gracillariidae. It is known from Ohio and Maine in the United States.

The larvae feed on Apocynum cannabinum. They mine the stem of their host plant. The mine has the form of a long whitish serpentine mine on the stem.
