= Schedocercops maeruae =

Scientific classification
- Kingdom: Animalia
- Phylum: Arthropoda
- Class: Insecta
- Order: Lepidoptera
- Family: Gracillariidae
- Genus: Schedocercops
- Species: S. maeruae

Binomial name
- Schedocercops maeruae Vári, 1961

Species of moth

Schedocercops maeruae is a moth of the family Gracillariidae. It is known from South Africa.

The larvae feed on Maerua racemulosa. They probably mine the leaves of their host plant.
