= Hypectopa =

Scientific classification
- Domain: Eukaryota
- Kingdom: Animalia
- Phylum: Arthropoda
- Class: Insecta
- Order: Lepidoptera
- Family: Gracillariidae
- Subfamily: Acrocercopinae
- Genus: Hypectopa; Diakonoff, 1955

Species
- See text

Genus of moths

Hypectopa is a genus of moths in the family Gracillariidae.

== Species ==
- Hypectopa ornithograpta Diakonoff, 1955
