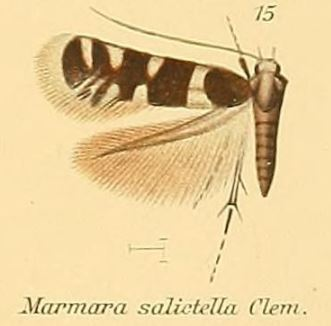
- Marmara salictella

Scientific classification
- Kingdom: Animalia
- Phylum: Arthropoda
- Clade: Pancrustacea
- Class: Insecta
- Order: Lepidoptera
- Family: Gracillariidae
- Subfamily: Marmarinae
- Genus: Marmara; Clemens, 1863

Species
- See text

Synonyms
- Aesyle Chambers, 1875

= Marmara (moth) =

Genus of moths

Marmara is a genus of moths in the family Gracillariidae.

The head is smooth, antennae four-fifths to one, basal joint thick, with slight pecten. Labial palpi moderately long, porrected, slender, with appressed scales, pointed. Maxillary palpi 3 absent, 4 absent, 6 absent, 8 absent, 11 absent. Hindwings about one-half, linear-canceolate, cilia: 3 absent, 4 absent, 5 and 6 stalked.

Correlated to Lithocolletis, but distinguished by the smooth head. Imago in repose sitting with forepart somewhat raised.

== Species ==
- Marmara affirmata (Meyrick, 1918)
- Marmara apocynella Braun, 1915
- Marmara arbutiella Busck, 1904
- Marmara auratella Braun, 1915
- Marmara basidendroca Fitzgerald, 1973
- Marmara corticola Fitzgerald, 1973
- Marmara elotella (Busck, 1909)
- Marmara fasciella (Chambers, 1875)
- Marmara fraxinicola Braun, 1922
- Marmara fulgidella (Clemens, 1860)
- Marmara guilandinella Busck, 1900
- Marmara gulosa Guillén & Davis, 2001
- Marmara habecki D.R. Davis, 2011
- Marmara ischnotoma (Meyrick, 1915)
- Marmara isortha (Meyrick, 1915)
- Marmara leptodesma Meyrick, 1928
- Marmara opuntiella Busck, 1907
- Marmara oregonensis Fitzgerald, 1975
- Marmara phaneropis (Meyrick, 1915)
- Marmara pomonella Busck, 1915
- Marmara salictella Clemens, 1863
- Marmara serotinella Busck, 1915
- Marmara smilacisella (Chambers, 1875)
