= Sauterina hexameris =

Scientific classification
- Kingdom: Animalia
- Phylum: Arthropoda
- Class: Insecta
- Order: Lepidoptera
- Family: Gracillariidae
- Genus: Sauterina
- Species: S. hexameris

Binomial name
- Sauterina hexameris (Meyrick, 1921)

Synonyms
- Gracilaria hexameris Meyrick, 1921; Caloptilia hexameris (Meyrick, 1921)

Species of moth

Caloptilia hexameris is a moth of the family Gracillariidae. It is known from Brazil.
