= Marmara leptodesma =

Scientific classification
- Kingdom: Animalia
- Phylum: Arthropoda
- Class: Insecta
- Order: Lepidoptera
- Family: Gracillariidae
- Genus: Marmara
- Species: M. leptodesma

Binomial name
- Marmara leptodesma Meyrick, 1928

Species of moth

Marmara leptodesma is a moth of the family Gracillariidae. It is known from the New Mexico and Texas in the United States.
