= Callicercops milloti =

Scientific classification
- Kingdom: Animalia
- Phylum: Arthropoda
- Class: Insecta
- Order: Lepidoptera
- Family: Gracillariidae
- Genus: Callicercops
- Species: C. milloti

Binomial name
- Callicercops milloti (Viette, 1951)

Synonyms
- Acrocercops milloti Viette, 1951

Species of moth

Callicercops milloti is a moth of the family Gracillariidae. It is known from Madagascar. The larvae feed on Bauhinia species. They roll the leaf of their host plant.
