= Guttigera albicaput =

Scientific classification
- Domain: Eukaryota
- Kingdom: Animalia
- Phylum: Arthropoda
- Class: Insecta
- Order: Lepidoptera
- Family: Gracillariidae
- Genus: Guttigera
- Species: G. albicaput

Binomial name
- Guttigera albicaput Diakonoff, 1955

Species of moth

Guttigera albicaput is a moth of the family Gracillariidae. It is known from Papua New Guinea.
