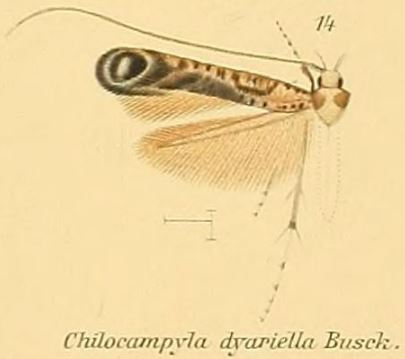
- Chilocampyla dyariella

Scientific classification
- Domain: Eukaryota
- Kingdom: Animalia
- Phylum: Arthropoda
- Class: Insecta
- Order: Lepidoptera
- Family: Gracillariidae
- Subfamily: Acrocercopinae
- Genus: Chilocampyla; Busck, 1900

Species
- See text

= Chilocampyla =

Genus of moths

Chilocampyla is a genus of moths in the family Gracillariidae.

== Species ==
- Chilocampyla dyariella Busck, 1900
- Chilocampyla psidiella Busck, 1934
