= Sauterina phiaropis =

Scientific classification
- Kingdom: Animalia
- Phylum: Arthropoda
- Class: Insecta
- Order: Lepidoptera
- Family: Gracillariidae
- Genus: Sauterina
- Species: S. phiaropis

Binomial name
- Sauterina phiaropis (Meyrick, 1921)

Synonyms
- Gracilaria phiaropis Meyrick, 1921; Caloptilia phiaropis (Meyrick, 1921)

Species of moth

Sauterina phiaropis is a moth of the family Gracillariidae. It is known from Peru.
