= Leucocercops dasmophora =

Scientific classification
- Kingdom: Animalia
- Phylum: Arthropoda
- Class: Insecta
- Order: Lepidoptera
- Family: Gracillariidae
- Genus: Leucocercops
- Species: L. dasmophora

Binomial name
- Leucocercops dasmophora (Meyrick, 1908)

Synonyms
- Acrocercops dasmophora Meyrick, 1908

Species of moth

Leucocercops dasmophora is a moth of the family Gracillariidae. It is known from South Africa.

The larvae feed on Parinari capensis. They probably mine the leaves of their host plant.
