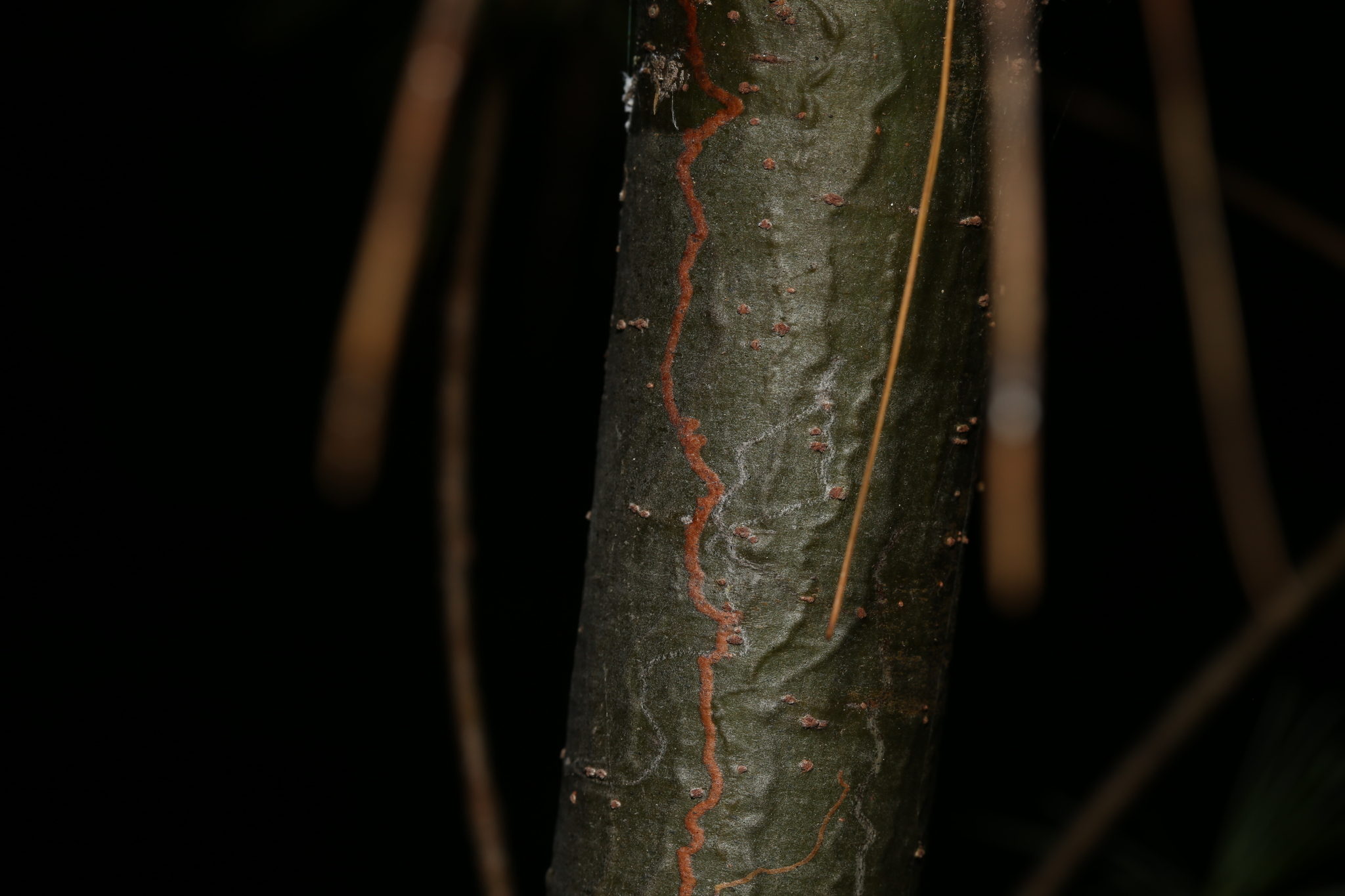
- Bark mine on Pinus strobus

Scientific classification
- Kingdom: Animalia
- Phylum: Arthropoda
- Clade: Pancrustacea
- Class: Insecta
- Order: Lepidoptera
- Family: Gracillariidae
- Genus: Marmara
- Species: M. fasciella

Binomial name
- Marmara fasciella (Chambers, 1875)

Synonyms
- Aesyle fasciella Chambers, 1875; Gracilaria quinquenotella Chambers 1877; Marmara quinquenotella Chambers 1877

= Marmara fasciella =

Species of moth

Marmara fasciella, the white pine barkminer moth, is a moth of the family Gracillariidae. It is found in Québec, Canada, and Kentucky, Maryland, New York, Vermont and Maine in the United States.

Adults are on wing from May to early July. The larvae feed on Quercus species, Abies balsamea, Pinus monticula and Pinus strobus.
