= Marmara guilandinella =

Scientific classification
- Domain: Eukaryota
- Kingdom: Animalia
- Phylum: Arthropoda
- Class: Insecta
- Order: Lepidoptera
- Family: Gracillariidae
- Genus: Marmara
- Species: M. guilandinella

Binomial name
- Marmara guilandinella Busck, 1900

Species of moth

Marmara guilandinella is a moth of the family Gracillariidae. It is known from Florida, United States.

The wingspan is about 4.8 mm.

The larvae feed on Caesalpinia bonduc. They mine the twigs of their host plant. The mine has the form of a very long, narrow, irregular serpentine, going upward or downward very near the surface just under the epidermis in the twig. The larva is very flat, much incised between the segments, tapering backward. At maturity it assumes a wine-red coloration of transverse bands. The cocoon is white and spun outside the mine.
