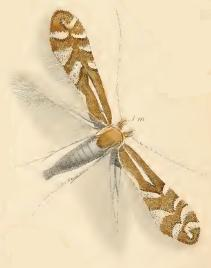

Scientific classification
- Domain: Eukaryota
- Kingdom: Animalia
- Phylum: Arthropoda
- Class: Insecta
- Order: Lepidoptera
- Family: Gracillariidae
- Genus: Phyllonorycter
- Species: P. lantanella

Binomial name
- Phyllonorycter lantanella (Schrank, 1802)

Synonyms
- Tinea lantanella Schrank, 1802

= Phyllonorycter lantanella =

Species of moth

Phyllonorycter lantanella is a moth of the family Gracillariidae. It is found in all of Europe, except Scandinavia, Ireland and the Balkan Peninsula.

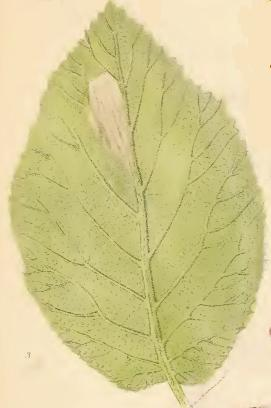
Mined Viburnum lantana leaf

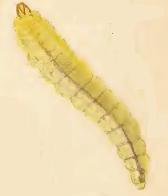
Larva

The wingspan is about 9 mm. There are two generations per year with adults on wing in May and again in August.

The larvae feed on the wayfaring tree (Viburnum lantana), guelder rose (Viburnum opulus), laurestine (Viburnum tinus) and rowan (Sorbus aucuparia), mining the leaves of their host plant.
