= Gracillaria confectella =

"Gracillaria" confectella

Scientific classification
- Kingdom: Animalia
- Phylum: Arthropoda
- Clade: Pancrustacea
- Class: Insecta
- Order: Lepidoptera
- Family: Gracillariidae
- Subfamily: Gracillariinae
- Genus: Gracillaria (disputed)
- Species: "G." confectella

Binomial name
- "Gracillaria" confectella Walker, 1864

Species of moth

"Gracillaria" confectella is a moth of the family Gracillariidae. It is known from Australia.
