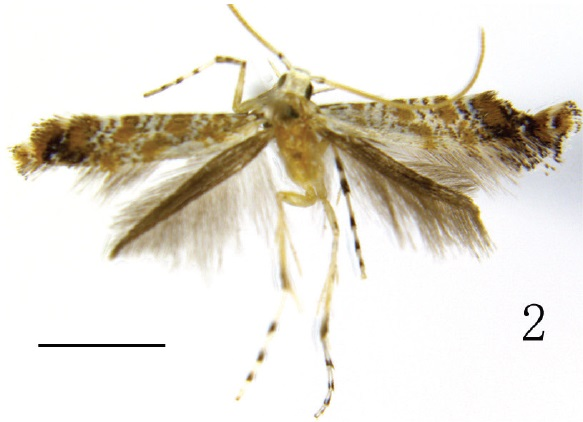

Scientific classification
- Kingdom: Animalia
- Phylum: Arthropoda
- Class: Insecta
- Order: Lepidoptera
- Family: Gracillariidae
- Genus: Eumetriochroa
- Species: E. hederae

Binomial name
- Eumetriochroa hederae Kumata, 1998

= Eumetriochroa hederae =

Species of moth

Eumetriochroa hederae is a moth of the family Gracillariidae. It is known from Japan (Honshū, Kyūshū, Shikoku), China (Hunan, Jiangxi), and Korea.

The wingspan is 8.1–9.7 mm. The larvae feed on Hedera rhombea and Hedera nepalensis var. sinensis. They mine the leaves of their host plant.
