= Guttigera =

Scientific classification
- Domain: Eukaryota
- Kingdom: Animalia
- Phylum: Arthropoda
- Class: Insecta
- Order: Lepidoptera
- Family: Gracillariidae
- Subfamily: Phyllocnistinae
- Genus: Guttigera; Diakonoff, 1955

Species
- See text

Genus of moths

Guttigera is a genus of moths in the family Gracillariidae.

== Species ==
- Guttigera albicaput Diakonoff, 1955
- Guttigera rhythmica Diakonoff, 1955
- Guttigera schefflerella Kobayashi, Huang & Hirowatari, 2013
