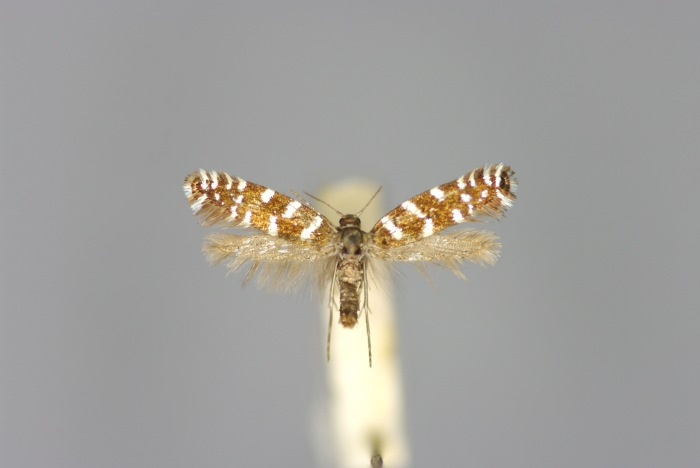

Scientific classification
- Domain: Eukaryota
- Kingdom: Animalia
- Phylum: Arthropoda
- Class: Insecta
- Order: Lepidoptera
- Family: Gracillariidae
- Genus: Callisto
- Species: C. coffeella

Binomial name
- Callisto coffeella (Zetterstedt, 1839)

Synonyms
- Oecophora interruptella Zetterstedt, 1839; Oecophora coffeella Zeller, 1839; Annickia alpicola Gibeaux, 1990

= Callisto coffeella =

Species of moth

Callisto coffeella is a moth of the family Gracillariidae found in Europe. It was first described by Johan Wilhelm Zetterstedt in 1839.

== Description ==
The wingspan is 10–12 mm. There is one generation per year, with adults on wing in June.

The larvae feed on mountain willow (Salix arbuscula), tea-leaved willow (Salix phylicifolia), and Salix silesiaca, mining the leaves of their host plant.

== Distribution ==
The moth is found from Fennoscandia and northern Russia to the Pyrenees, Italy and Romania and from Scotland to Ukraine.
