= Eumetriochroa kalopanacis =

Scientific classification
- Kingdom: Animalia
- Phylum: Arthropoda
- Class: Insecta
- Order: Lepidoptera
- Family: Gracillariidae
- Genus: Eumetriochroa
- Species: E. kalopanacis

Binomial name
- Eumetriochroa kalopanacis Kumata, 1998

Species of moth

Eumetriochroa kalopanacis is a moth of the family Gracillariidae. It is known from Japan (Hokkaidō and Honshū islands).

The wingspan is 6.4-7.2 mm for the autumnal form and about 5.7 mm for the aestival (summer) form. There are two seasonal forms, which differ in size and colour: one is an aestival form with adults on wing in summer from July to August, and the other is an autumnal form with adults on wing in autumn from mid September to October.

The larvae feed on Kalopanax pictus. They mine the leaves of their host plant.
