= Callicercops =

Scientific classification
- Domain: Eukaryota
- Kingdom: Animalia
- Phylum: Arthropoda
- Class: Insecta
- Order: Lepidoptera
- Family: Gracillariidae
- Subfamily: Gracillariinae
- Genus: Callicercops; Vári, 1961

Species
- See text

Genus of moths

Callicercops is a genus of moths in the family Gracillariidae.

== Species ==
- Callicercops iridocrossa (Meyrick, 1938)
- Callicercops milloti (Viette, 1951)
- Callicercops triceros (Meyrick, 1926)
