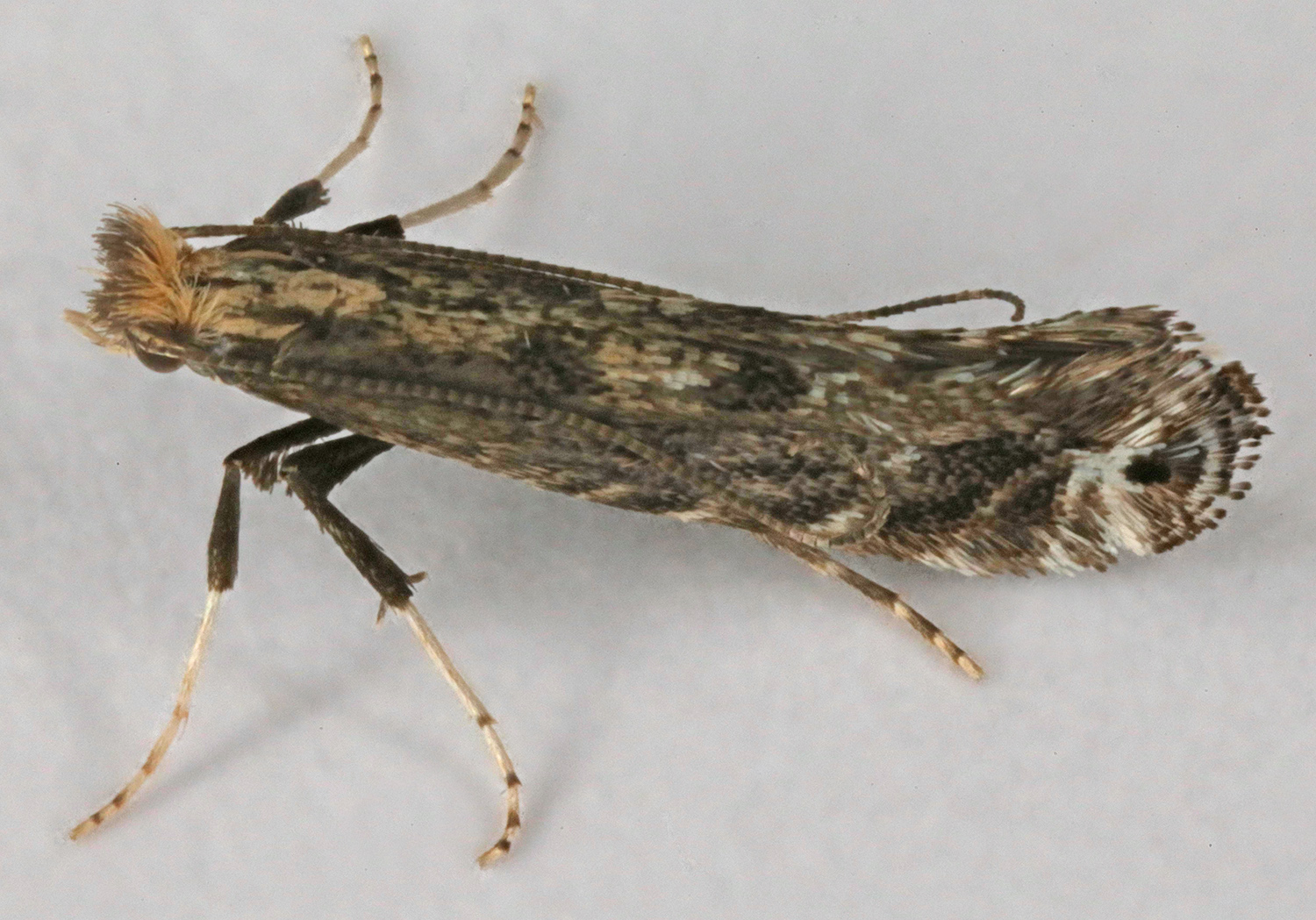
- Parornix torquillella

Scientific classification
- Kingdom: Animalia
- Phylum: Arthropoda
- Class: Insecta
- Order: Lepidoptera
- Family: Gracillariidae
- Subfamily: Parornichinae; Kuznetzov & Baryshnikova, 2001

Genera
- Four, see text

= Parornichinae =

Subfamily of moths

Parornichinae is a subfamily of moths described by Vladimir Ivanovitsch Kuznetzov and Svetlana Vladimirovna Baryshnikova in 2001.

== Genera ==
In alphabetical order:

- Callisto Stephens, 1834
  - =Annickia Gibeaux, 1990
- Graphiocephala Vári, 1961
- Parornix Spuler, 1910
  - =Alfaornix Kuznetzov, 1979
  - =Betaornix Kuznetzov, 1979
  - =Deltaornix Kuznetzov, 1979
  - =Gammaornix Kuznetzov, 1979
- Pleiomorpha Vári, 1961
