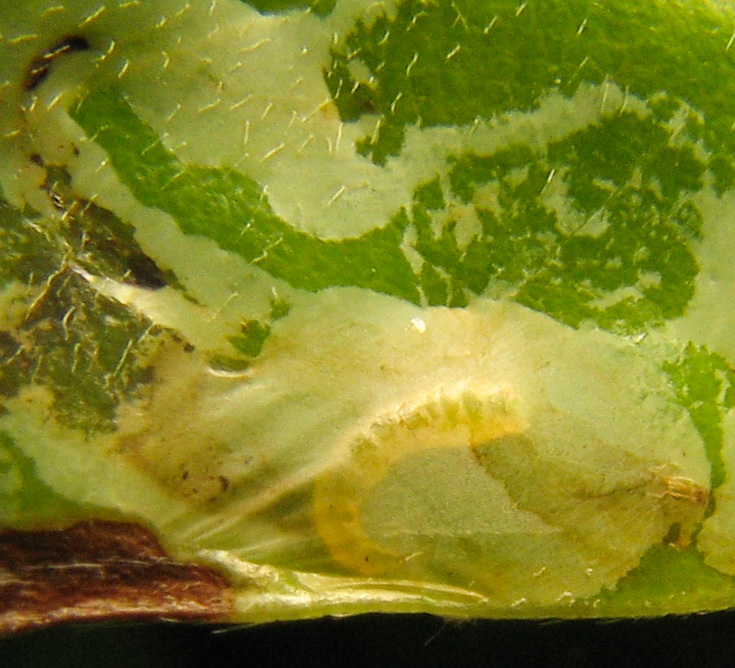
- Caterpillar inside leaf mine

Scientific classification
- Kingdom: Animalia
- Phylum: Arthropoda
- Clade: Pancrustacea
- Class: Insecta
- Order: Lepidoptera
- Family: Gracillariidae
- Genus: Phyllocnistis
- Species: P. magnoliella

Binomial name
- Phyllocnistis magnoliella Chambers, 1878

Synonyms
- Phyllocnistis magnoliaella Busck, 1900; Phyllocnistis magnoliella Dyar, [1903]

= Phyllocnistis magnoliella =

Species of moth

Phyllocnistis magnoliella (magnolia serpentine leafminer moth) is a moth of the family Gracillariidae, known from the United States (Florida, Georgia, Louisiana, Virginia, Kentucky, Maryland, Pennsylvania, New Jersey and New York). The hostplants for the species include Magnolia acuminata, Magnolia grandiflora, Magnolia umbrella, and Magnolia virginiana.

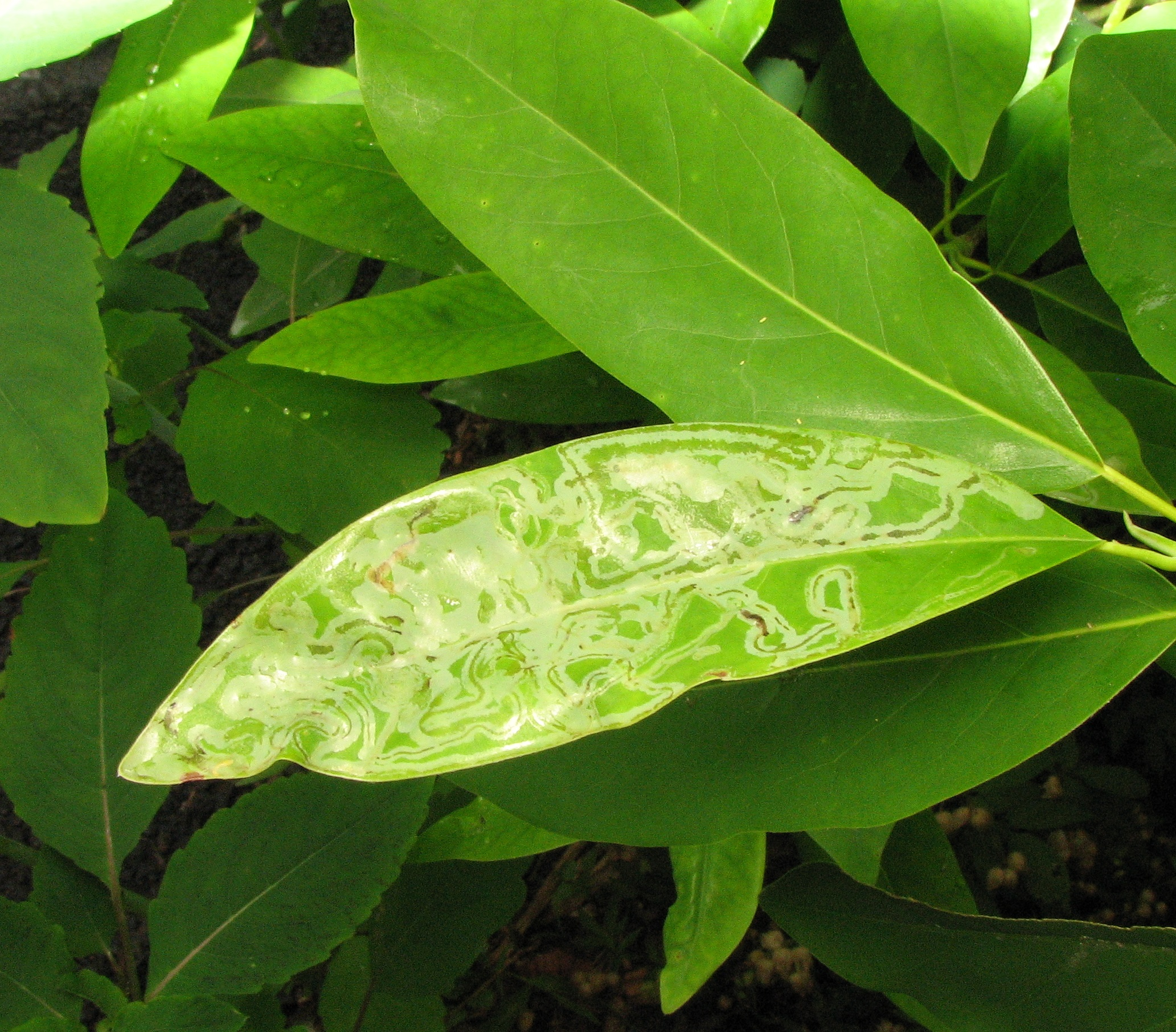
Magnolia leaf with mines made by P. magnoliella
