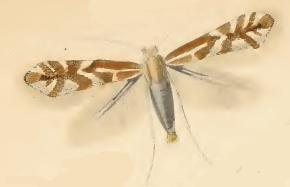

Scientific classification
- Kingdom: Animalia
- Phylum: Arthropoda
- Clade: Pancrustacea
- Class: Insecta
- Order: Lepidoptera
- Family: Gracillariidae
- Genus: Phyllonorycter
- Species: P. viminetorum

Binomial name
- Phyllonorycter viminetorum (Stainton, 1854)

Synonyms
- Lithocolletis viminetorum Stainton, 1854

= Phyllonorycter viminetorum =

Species of moth

Phyllonorycter viminetorum is a moth of the family Gracillariidae. It is found from Latvia to the Pyrenees and Italy and from Ireland to Ukraine.

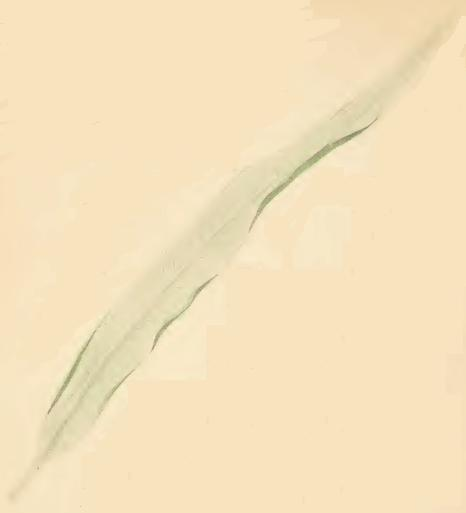
Mined leaf of Salix viminalis

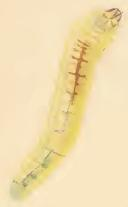
Larva

The wingspan is 8–9 mm. The antennae with the apex whitish. Forewings golden-brown, sprinkled with dark fuscous; a slender white median streak from base to near middle; a triangular white dorsal spot at 1/3 reaching basal streak; an angulated sometimes interrupted median fascia, three ill-defined posterior costal and two dorsal spots white, anteriorly dark margined; an elongate blackish apical dot. Hindwings are dark grey. The larva is pale yellowish; dorsal line greenish; head pale brown.

The larvae feed on Salix viminalis. They mine the leaves of their host plant.
