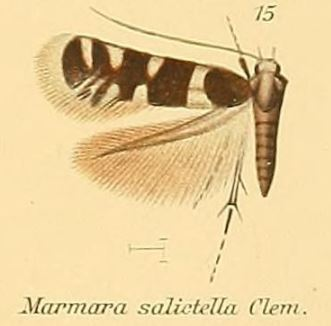

Scientific classification
- Kingdom: Animalia
- Phylum: Arthropoda
- Clade: Pancrustacea
- Class: Insecta
- Order: Lepidoptera
- Family: Gracillariidae
- Genus: Marmara
- Species: M. salictella

Binomial name
- Marmara salictella Clemens, 1863

Synonyms
- Marmara saliclella (Chambers, 1878)

= Marmara salictella =

Species of moth

Marmara salictella is a moth of the family Gracillariidae. It is known from Québec in Canada and Connecticut, Maine, Vermont, Virginia, California and the Atlantic states of the United States.

The larvae feed on Salix species, including Salix lasiolepis and Salix lutea.
