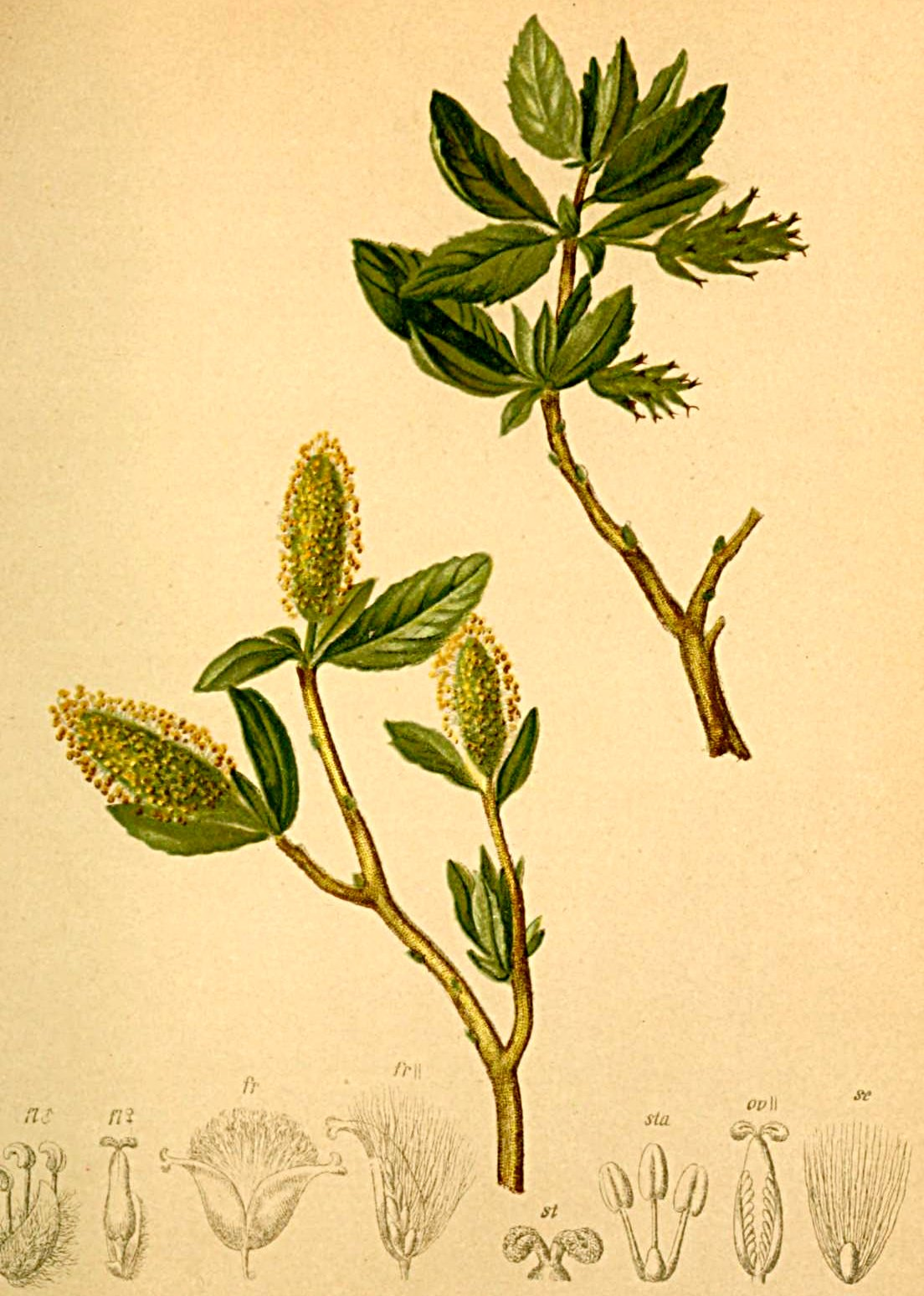

Conservation status
- Least Concern (IUCN 3.1)

Scientific classification
- Kingdom: Plantae
- Clade: Embryophytes
- Clade: Tracheophytes
- Clade: Angiosperms
- Clade: Eudicots
- Clade: Rosids
- Order: Malpighiales
- Family: Salicaceae
- Genus: Salix
- Species: S. waldsteiniana

Binomial name
- Salix waldsteiniana Willd.

= Salix waldsteiniana =

Shrub in the genus of willows

Salix waldsteiniana, the Waldstein willow, is a species of willow native to Europe.

== Description ==
Flowering takes place in May-June. The shrub has a size of 30 to 150 cm. In the fall, its golden foliage makes it very decorative.

Salix waldsteiniana grows in Italy, Austria, Germany, Switzerland, the Balkan Peninsula, the Alps (1,500 to 2,500 m above sea level) and the Greater Balkans.

== Synonymy ==
- Salix arbuscula var. waldsteiniana (Willd.) K.Koch
- Salix prunifolia Sm.

== Bibliography ==
- Hassler M. (2016). World Plants: Synonymic Checklists of the Vascular Plants of the World (version Nov 2015). In: Species 2000 & ITIS Catalog of Life, 2016 Annual Checklist (Roskov Y., Abucay L., Orrell T., Nicolson D., Flann C., Bailly N., Kirk P., Bourgoin T., DeWalt RE, Decock W., De Wever A., eds). Digital resource at www.catalogueoflife.org/annual-checklist/2016. Species 2000: Naturalis, Leiden, the Netherlands. ISSN 2405-884X.
- Botanische Jahrbücher für Systematik, Pflanzengeschichte und Pflanzengeographie, Adolf Engler (1844-1930), newspaper, publication info, Stuttgart: Schweizerbart, [1881] -2009.
- Walter Erhardt, Erich Götz, Nils Bödeker, Siegmund Seybold: Der große Zander. Eugen Ulmer KG, Stuttgart 2008, ( ISBN 978-3-8001-5406-7 ) . (g.)
- Christopher Brickell (Editor-in-chief): RHS AZ Encyclopedia of Garden Plants. Third edition. Dorling Kindersley, London 2003, ( ISBN 0-7513-3738-2 ) . (Eng.)
