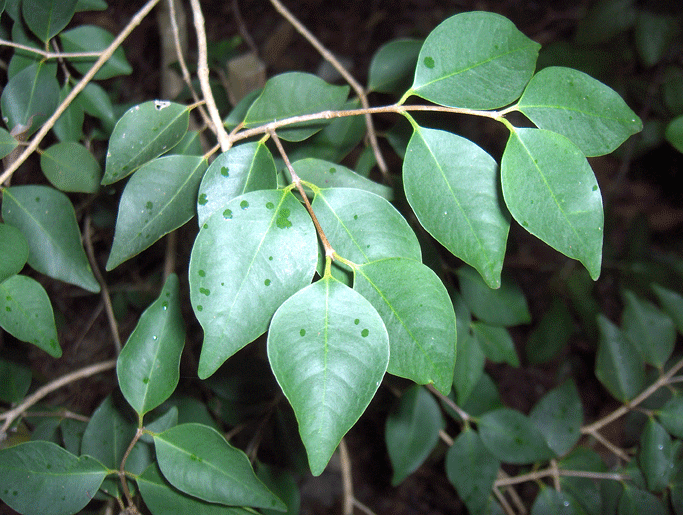
- Foliage

Conservation status
- Least Concern (IUCN 3.1)

Scientific classification
- Kingdom: Plantae
- Clade: Tracheophytes
- Clade: Angiosperms
- Clade: Eudicots
- Clade: Rosids
- Order: Myrtales
- Family: Myrtaceae
- Genus: Eugenia
- Species: E. rhombea

Binomial name
- Eugenia rhombea (O.Berg) Krug & Urb.

Synonyms
- Eugenia fiscalensis Donn.Sm.; Eugenia foetida var. rhombea O.Berg; Eugenia leptopa Lundell; Eugenia pusilana Lundell

= Eugenia rhombea =

Species of plant

Eugenia rhombea, the red stopper, is a species of flowering plant in the family Myrtaceae. It is native to southern Florida, Mexico, Central America, the Caribbean, and northern Venezuela. A shrub or tree reaching 12 ft (3.7 m) with white flowers, it is typically found in rockland hammocks.
