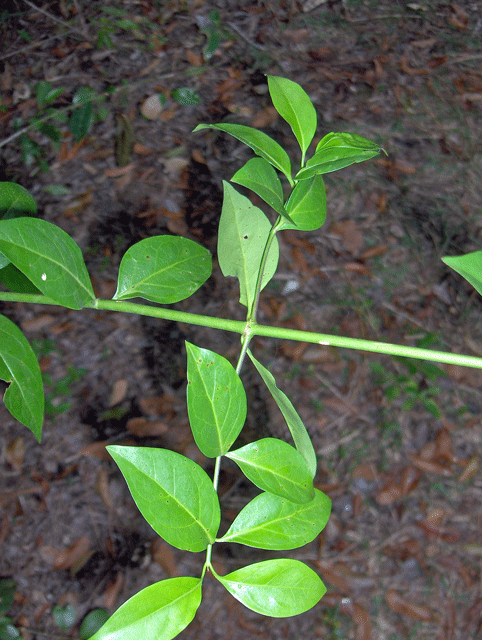
- Leaves
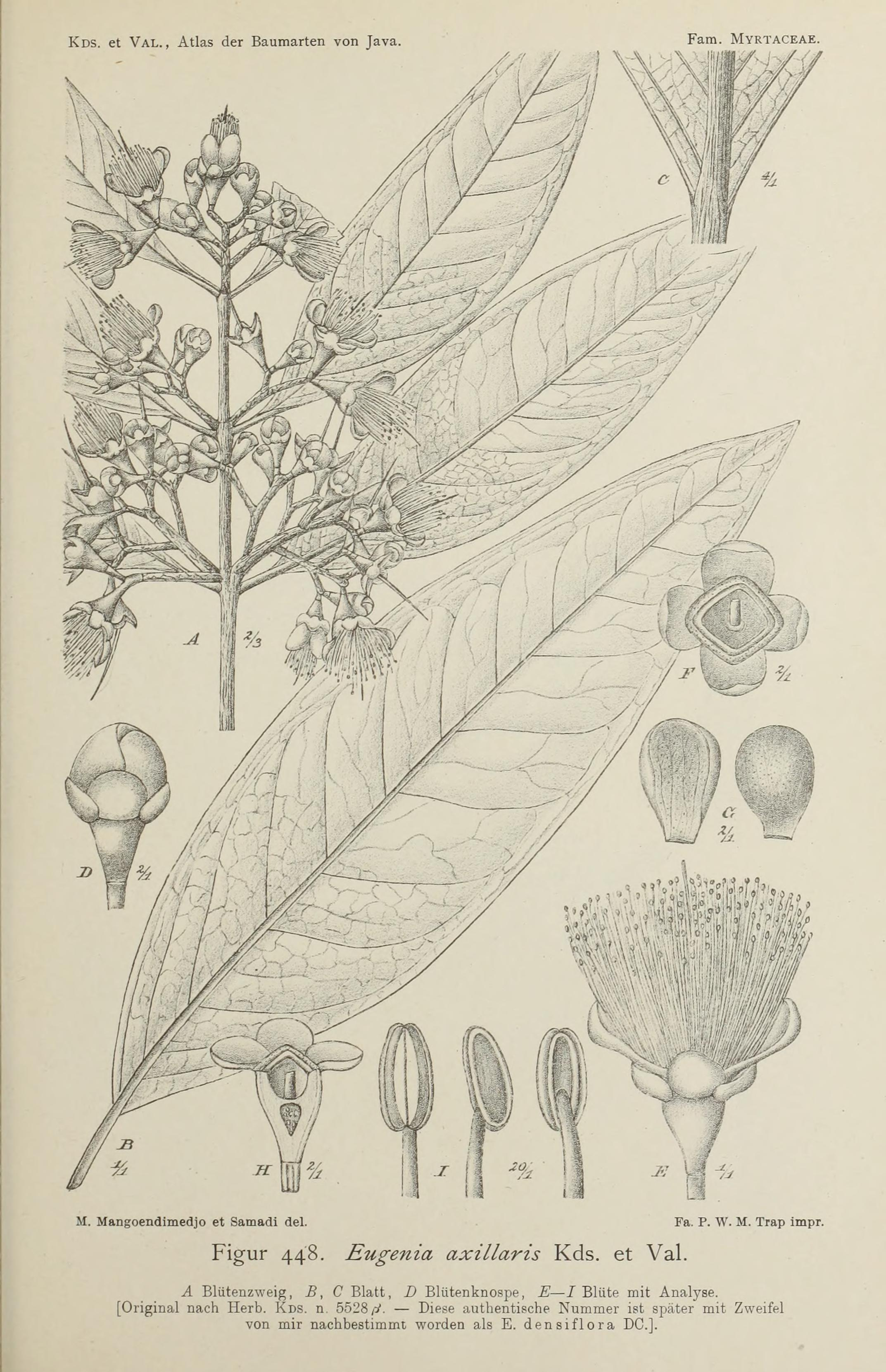
- Botanical illustration

Conservation status
- Least Concern (IUCN 3.1)

Scientific classification
- Kingdom: Plantae
- Clade: Tracheophytes
- Clade: Angiosperms
- Clade: Eudicots
- Clade: Rosids
- Order: Myrtales
- Family: Myrtaceae
- Genus: Eugenia
- Species: E. axillaris

Binomial name
- Eugenia axillaris (Sw.) Willd.

Synonyms
- List: Eugenia anthera Small; Eugenia axillaris var. cozumelensis (Lundell) Lundell; Eugenia axillaris var. microcarpa Krug & Urb.; Eugenia baruensis (Jacq.) Jacq.; Eugenia cabanisiana O.Berg; Eugenia carthagenensis var. baruensis Jacq.; Eugenia carthagenensis var. myrtifolia Jacq.; Eugenia cozumelensis Lundell; Eugenia divaricata Willd. ex O.Berg; Eugenia guadalupensis DC.; Eugenia guttata Lundell; Eugenia itzana Lundell; Eugenia matanzensis O.Berg; Eugenia minimiflora Lundell; Eugenia verrucosa A.Rich.; Eugenia yumuryensis O.Berg; Myrtus axillaris Sw.; Myrtus baruensis (Jacq.) Spreng.; Myrtus divaricata Ham.; Psidiastrum dubium Bello

= Eugenia axillaris =

Species of plant

Eugenia axillaris, the white stopper, is a species of flowering plant in the family Myrtaceae. It is native to central and southern Florida, the Caribbean, Bermuda, eastern Mexico, and Central America. An evergreen shrub or tree reaching 20 to 30 ft (6 to 9 m) but often shorter, it is typically found in partly shady coastal hammocks and other sandy areas.
