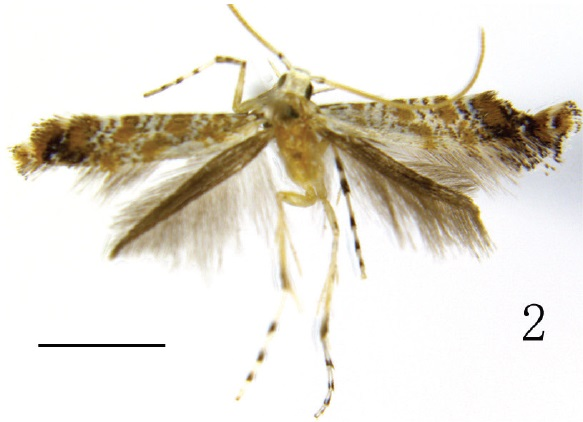

Scientific classification
- Kingdom: Animalia
- Phylum: Arthropoda
- Class: Insecta
- Order: Lepidoptera
- Family: Gracillariidae
- Subfamily: Phyllocnistinae
- Genus: Eumetriochroa; Kumata, 1998

Species
- See text

= Eumetriochroa =

Genus of moths

Eumetriochroa is a genus of moths in the family Gracillariidae.

== Etymology ==
The name is derived from the Greek eu (meaning original, primitive), metrios (meaning moderate, temperate) and chroa (skin, colour of skin).

== Species ==
- Eumetriochroa araliella Kobayashi, Huang & Hirowatari, 2013
- Eumetriochroa hederae Kumata, 1998
- Eumetriochroa hiranoi Kumata, 1998
- Eumetriochroa kalopanacis Kumata, 1998
- Eumetriochroa miyatai Kumata, 1998
