= Akito Y. Kawahara =

Entomologist

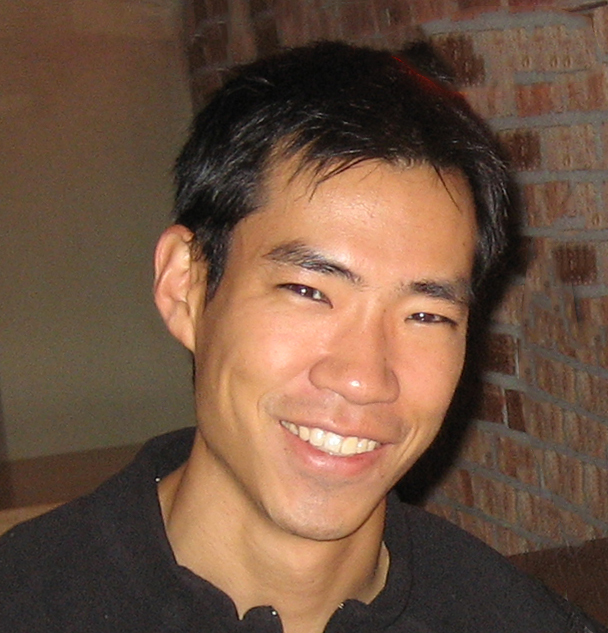
- Born: New York City, United States
- Education: Cornell University, B.S. Smithsonian Institution & University of Maryland, M.S. and Ph.D. all in Entomology
- Alma mater: Cornell University
- Known for: Entomology, Evolution
- Scientific career
- Fields: Biology; Evolutionary Biology; Entomology
- Institutions: University of Florida
- Website: akitokawahara.com

Akito Y. Kawahara is an American and Japanese entomologist, scientist, and advocate of nature education, and the son of the modern conceptual artist On Kawara.

== Education ==
Kawahara received his bachelor's degree from Cornell University in 2002 and his Ph.D. from the University of Maryland with Dr. Charles Mitter through the Smithsonian Institution, National Museum of Natural History in 2010. He was a National Science Foundation Postdoctoral Fellow at the University of Hawaiʻi at Mānoa before starting his position at the University of Florida.

== Career ==
Kawahara is a Professor and Curator at the University of Florida and lead researcher at the Florida Museum of Natural History's McGuire Center for Lepidoptera and Biodiversity. He was named Director of the McGuire Center in August 2023. He holds the position of Research Associate at the Smithsonian Institution, National Museum of Natural History.

Kawahara's research interests are insect evolution, predator-prey interactions, and genetics. He has published over 215 peer-reviewed scientific papers. Among his largest contributions are papers on the evolution of butterflies and moths.

He also conducts research on ultrasound production and hearing in moths and echolocation in bats, which he works on with Dr. Jesse Barber. He has also published numerous papers on the importance of insects as models for nature education, including an article on the action items that every individual can do to help global insect declines.

== Awards and recognition ==
Kawahara has appeared in numerous films, television programs, and radio productions, including Nature: "American Spring LIVE" (2019), Nature: "Nature's Sex, Lies, and Butterflies" (2018), David Attenborough's Conquest of the Skies 3D (2015), Beetle Queen Conquers Tokyo (2009), and Nature: "Bugs That Rule the World" (2025).

He has also been featured on NPR programs including All Things Considered (2023) and the Radiolab episode The Caterpillar Roadshow (2025), as well as in Science Friday (2023). His work has been covered by Smithsonian magazine, and he has been featured on Japanese television, including Fuji Television (October 2024) and Asahi Television (October 2024).

Kawahara received the UF Excellence Award for Assistant Professors (2013) and a UF Term Professorship (2017), along with honors such as the International Congress of Entomology Young Investigator Award and the ESA’s John Henry Comstock Award, among others.

== Personal life ==
Kawahara was born in New York City, United States. He is the son of modern Contemporary Artist, On Kawara. As a child, he traveled between New York and Tokyo annually, attending two schools simultaneously, a schooling called "Taiheiyou-tsugaku" (Trans-Pacific Commute). He resides in Florida and New York, and has two children.

== Selected publications ==
- Barber, Jesse R.; Kawahara, Akito Y. (23 August 2013). "Hawkmoths produce anti-bat ultrasound". Biology Letters. 9 (4) 20130161. doi:10.1098/rsbl.2013.0161. PMC 3730625. PMID 23825084.
- Kawahara, Akito Y.; Breinholt, Jesse W. (7 August 2014). "Phylogenomics provides strong evidence for relationships of butterflies and moths". Proceedings of the Royal Society B: Biological Sciences. 281 (1788) 20140970. doi:10.1098/rspb.2014.0970. PMC 4083801. PMID 24966318.
- Barber, Jesse R.; Leavell, Brian C.; Keener, Adam L.; Breinholt, Jesse W.; Chadwell, Brad A.; McClure, Christopher J. W.; Hill, Geena M.; Kawahara, Akito Y. (3 March 2015). "Moth tails divert bat attack: Evolution of acoustic deflection". Proceedings of the National Academy of Sciences. 112 (9): 2812–2816. Bibcode:2015PNAS..112.2812B. doi:10.1073/pnas.1421926112. PMC 4352808. PMID 25730869.
- Breinholt, Jesse W.; Earl, Chandra; Lemmon, Alan R.; Lemmon, Emily Moriarty; Xiao, Lei; Kawahara, Akito Y. (1 January 2018). "Resolving Relationships among the Megadiverse Butterflies and Moths with a Novel Pipeline for Anchored Phylogenomics". Systematic Biology. 67 (1): 78–93. doi:10.1093/sysbio/syx048. PMID 28472519. S2CID 3658506.
- Kawahara, Akito Y.; Plotkin, David; Espeland, Marianne; Meusemann, Karen; Toussaint, Emmanuel F. A.; Donath, Alexander; Gimnich, France; Frandsen, Paul B.; Zwick, Andreas; Reis, Mario dos; Barber, Jesse R.; Peters, Ralph S.; Liu, Shanlin; Zhou, Xin; Mayer, Christoph; Podsiadlowski, Lars; Storer, Caroline; Yack, Jayne E.; Misof, Bernhard; Breinholt, Jesse W. (5 November 2019). "Phylogenomics reveals the evolutionary timing and pattern of butterflies and moths". Proceedings of the National Academy of Sciences. 116 (45): 22657–22663. Bibcode:2019PNAS..11622657K. doi:10.1073/pnas.1907847116. PMC 6842621. PMID 31636187.
- Kawahara, Akito Y.; Reeves, Lawrence E.; Barber, Jesse R.; Black, Scott H. (12 January 2021). "Opinion: Eight simple actions that individuals can take to save insects from global declines". Proceedings of the National Academy of Sciences. 118 (2) e2002547117. Bibcode:2021PNAS..11820025K. doi:10.1073/pnas.2002547117. PMC 7812750. PMID 33431563.
- Barber, J.R.; Plotkin, D.; Rubin, J.J.; Homziak, N.; Leavell, B.C.; Houlihan, P.; Miner, K.; Breinholt, J.W.; Quirk-Royal, B.; Padron, S.; Nunez, M.; Kawahara, A.Y. (2022). "Anti-bat ultrasound production in moths is globally and phylogenetically widespread". Proceedings of the National Academy of Sciences. 119 (25) e2117485119. doi:10.1073/pnas.2117485119. PMC 9231501.
- Kawahara, A.Y.; Storer, C.; Carvalho, A.P.S.; Plotkin, D.M. (2023). "A comprehensive phylogeny of butterflies reveals their evolutionary history, ancestral hosts and biogeographic origins". Nature Ecology and Evolution. 7: 903–913.
- Gross, C.P.; Kawahara, A.Y.; Daru, B. (2025-01-14). "Climate and regional plant richness drive diet specialization in butterfly caterpillars". Ecology Letters.
- Pinkert, S.; Farwig, N.; Kawahara, A.Y.; Jetz, W. (2025-03-24). "Global hotspots of butterfly diversity in a warming world". Nature Ecology and Evolution. doi:10.1038/s41559-025-02664-0. PMC 12066357.
- Rubin, J. (2025-05-07). "Strong bat predation and weak environmental constraints predict longer moth tails". Proceedings of the Royal Society B. 292 (2046). doi:10.1098/rspb.2024.2824. PMC 12056560.
