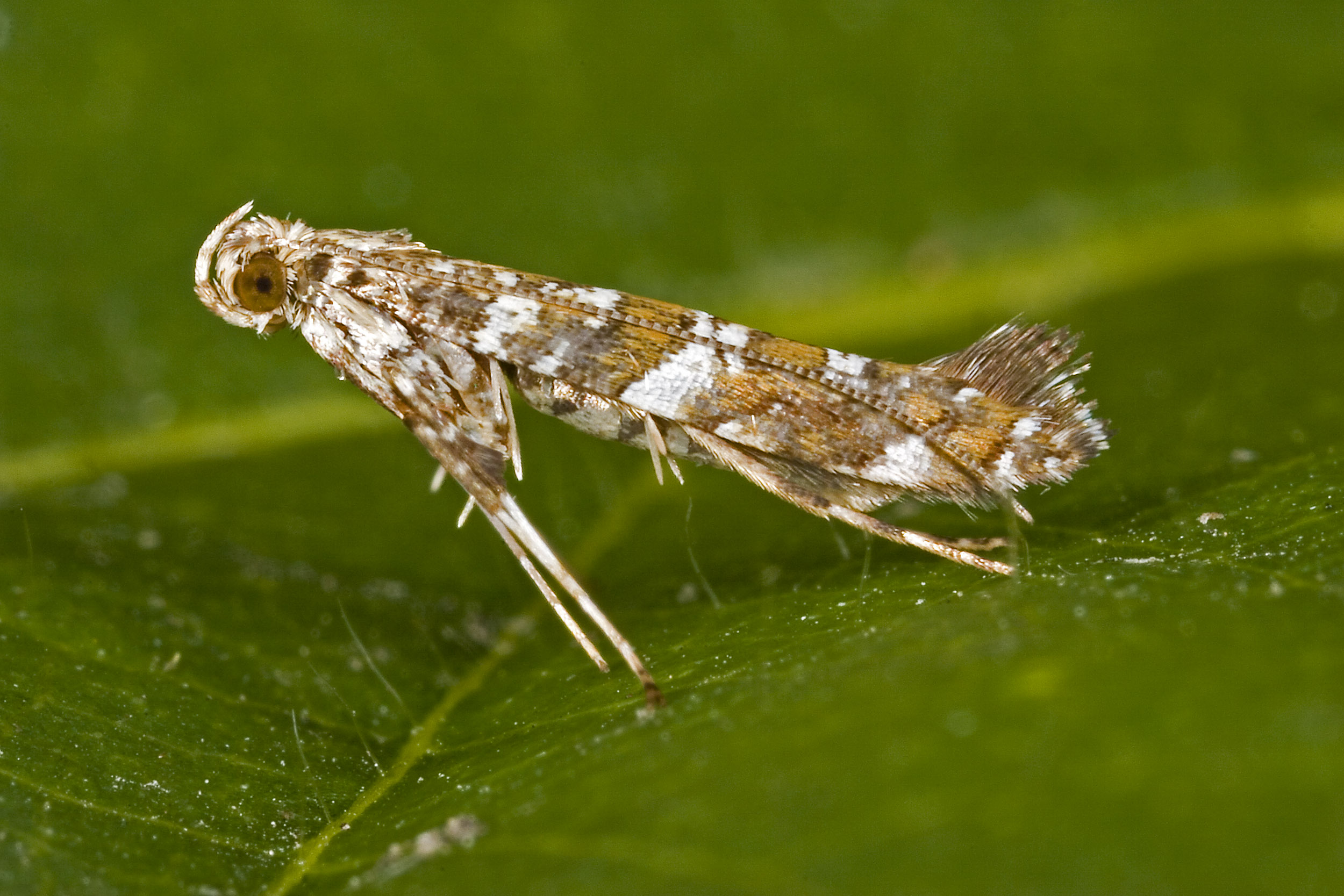
- Privet leaf miner, Gracillaria syringella (Fabricius, 1794)

Scientific classification
- Kingdom: Animalia
- Phylum: Arthropoda
- Clade: Pancrustacea
- Class: Insecta
- Order: Lepidoptera
- Superfamily: Gracillarioidea
- Family: Gracillariidae; Stainton, 1854

Subfamilies
- Gracillariinae Stainton, 1854; Lithocolletinae Stainton, 1854; Phyllocnistinae Herrich-Schäffer, 1857; Genera – see "Subfamilies and genera"

Diversity
- About 101 genera and 1,866 species

= Gracillariidae =

Family of moths

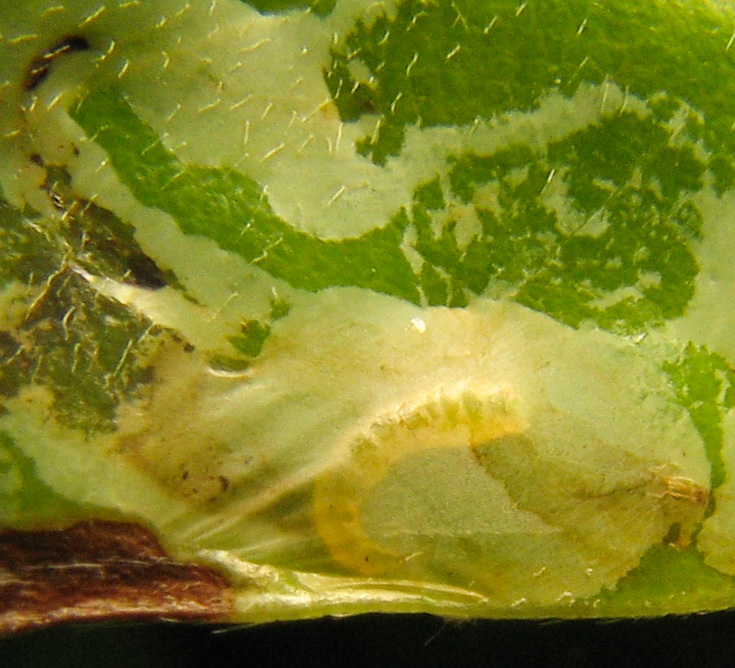
Phyllocnistis magnoliella in magnolia leaf.

Gracillariidae is an important family of insects in the order Lepidoptera and the principal family of leaf miners that includes several economic, horticultural or recently invasive pest species such as the horse-chestnut leaf miner, Cameraria ohridella.

== Taxonomy and systematics ==
There are 98 described genera of Gracillariidae (see below). A complete checklist is available of all currently recognised species. There are many undescribed species in the tropics but there is also an online catalogue of Afrotropical described species; the South African fauna is quite well known. Although Japanese and Russian authors have recognised additional subfamilies, there are three currently recognised subfamilies, Phyllocnistinae of which is likely to be basal. In this subfamily, the primitive genus Prophyllocnistis from Chile feeds on the plant genus Drimys (Winteraceae), and has leaf mines structurally similar in structure to fossils (see "Fossils"). While there have been some recent DNA sequence-based studies of Palaearctic species there is need for a satisfactory modern global phylogenetic framework for the subfamilies of Gracillariidae. Some genera are very large, e.g. Acrocercops, Caloptilia, Cameraria, Epicephala and Phyllonorycter.

== Distribution ==
Gracillariidae occur in all terrestrial regions of the world except Antarctica.

== Identification ==
These generally small (wingspan 5–20 mm) moths are leaf miners as caterpillars, which can provide a useful means of identification, especially if the hostplant is known. The subfamilies differ by the adult moth resting posture (Davis and Robinson, 1999). Most Gracillariinae rest with the front of the body steeply raised; Lithocolletinae and Phyllocnistinae rest with the body parallel to the surface; in Lithocolletinae often with the head lowered.

Some additional features can be seen under close examination. The antennal flagellomeres of adults have two rows of scales: a basal row with large scales covering an apical row with smaller scales. The male genitalia has only four pair of muscles and lacks a gnathos. The female ovipositor is short and laterally flattened.

== Life history ==
Most larval Gracillariidae undergo hypermetamorphosis, meaning there is a major change within the larval stage. Early instars have a flattened head and body, modified mandibles, and lack functional spinnerets or legs; these feed on sap. Later instars are cylindrical with round heads, and have chewing mouthparts, legs and functional spinnerets; these feed on plant tissue. Some species additionally have a spinning instar that does not feed, and others have a non-feeding instar before this spinning instar.

The Brazilian Spinivalva gaucha is an exception to this trend, lacking a sap-feeding stage.

Gracillariidae have various lifestyles. Some larvae mine leaves while others instead roll leaves, and there are also larvae which mine other plant parts or form galls.

== Larval hostplants ==
Many host plants are known, generally dicotyledonous trees or shrubs. Patterns of hostplant shifting have been inferred for many United Kingdom species in the genus Phyllonorycter and its sister genus Cameraria. A recent DNA sequencing study mainly of Palaearctic species has shown that the burst of evolutionary adaptive radiation occurred long after that of the larval hostplants, rather than demonstrating a tight coevolutionary process.

== Fossils ==
The family is an old one, with fossil Phyllocnistinae mines known from 97-million-year-old rocks in Kansas and Nebraska. There are other fossil mines known from rocks of Eocene and Miocene age. There are also two adult moths known from Lithuanian or Baltic amber of Eocene age: Gracillariites lithuanicus Kozlov, 1987 and G. mixtus Kozlov, 1987.

== Subfamilies and genera ==
Phylogeny of Gracillariidae

- Gracillariidae
  - - - - - Lithocolletinae
          - Phyllocnistinae
        - - Marmarinae
          - - Oecophyllembiinae
            - Acrocercopinae
    - - Gracillariinae
      - - Parornichinae
        - Callicercopinae
  - Ornixolinae

from Li et al. 2022

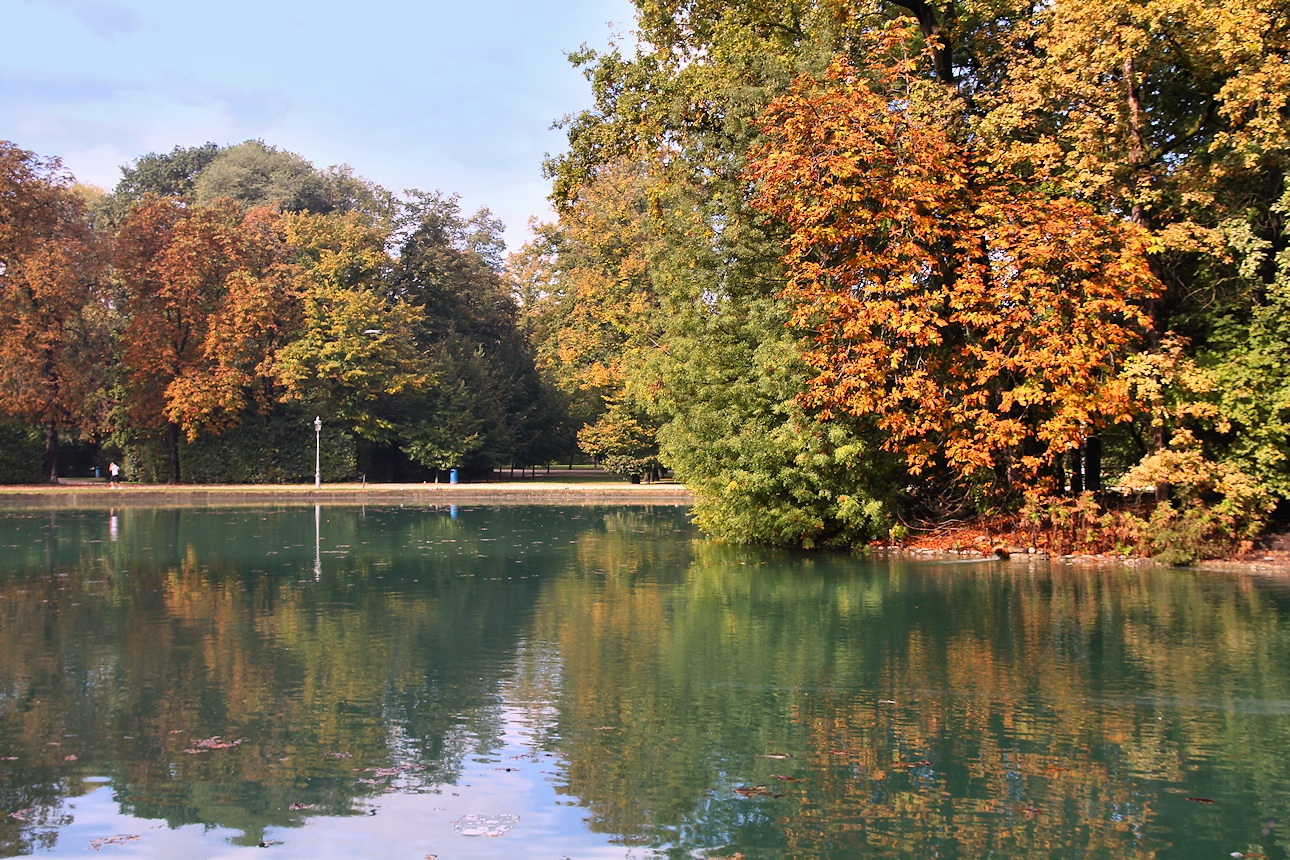
Horse-chestnut leaf miner (Cameraria ohridella) tree damage in Parma, Italy

Gracillariidae phylogeny has been revised in 2017 and is now containing eight subfamilies:

- Acrocercopinae Kawahara & Ohshima, 2016
- Callicercopinae Li, Ohshima & Kawahara, 2022
- Gracillariinae Stainton, 1854
- Lithocolletinae Stainton, 1854
- Marmarinae Kawahara & Ohshima, 2016
- Oecophyllembiinae Réal & Balachowsky, 1966
- Ornixolinae Kuznetzov & Baryshnikova, 2001
- Parornichinae Kawahara & Ohshima, 2016
- Phyllocnistinae Herrich-Schäffer, 1857

Unplaced species

- "Ornix" blandella Müller-Rutz, 1920, this species was described from Switzerland. Larvae were recorded feeding on Salix. The present taxonomic status is unknown.
- "Gracilaria" confectella Walker, 1864
- "Gracilaria" delicatulella Walker, 1864
- "Phyllonorycter" fennicella Hering, 1924, this species was described from Finland. The larval hostplant is probably a Salix species. The present taxonomic status is unknown, but is probably a junior subjective synonym of Lithocolletis viminetorum or Lithocolletis salictella.
- "Lithocolletis" graeseriella Sorhagen, 1900, see Phyllonorycter
- "Lithocolletis" italica Herrich-Schäffer, 1855, this species was described from Italy. The present taxonomic status is unknown.
- "Ornix" jyngipennella Heydenreich, 1851, nomen nudum.
- "Lithocolletis" lativitella Sorhagen, 1900, this species was described from Germany. Larvae were recorded feeding on Sorbus aria and Pyrus scandinavica. The present taxonomic status is unknown. It might be a synonym of Tinea lantanella Schrank, 1802.
- "Lithocolletis" norvegicella Strand, 1919, this species was described from Norway. The present taxonomic status is unknown.
- "Gracillaria" pistaciella Rondani, 1876, this species was described from Italy. Larvae were recorded feeding on Pistacia terebinthus.
- "Ornix" quercella Müller-Rutz, 1934, this species was described from Switzerland. Larvae were probably bred from a mine on a Quercus species. The present taxonomic status is unknown.
- "Phyllonorycter" sessilifoliella Hering, 1957, this species was recorded from southern France, where it was said to have been reared on a Quercus species. nomen nudum
