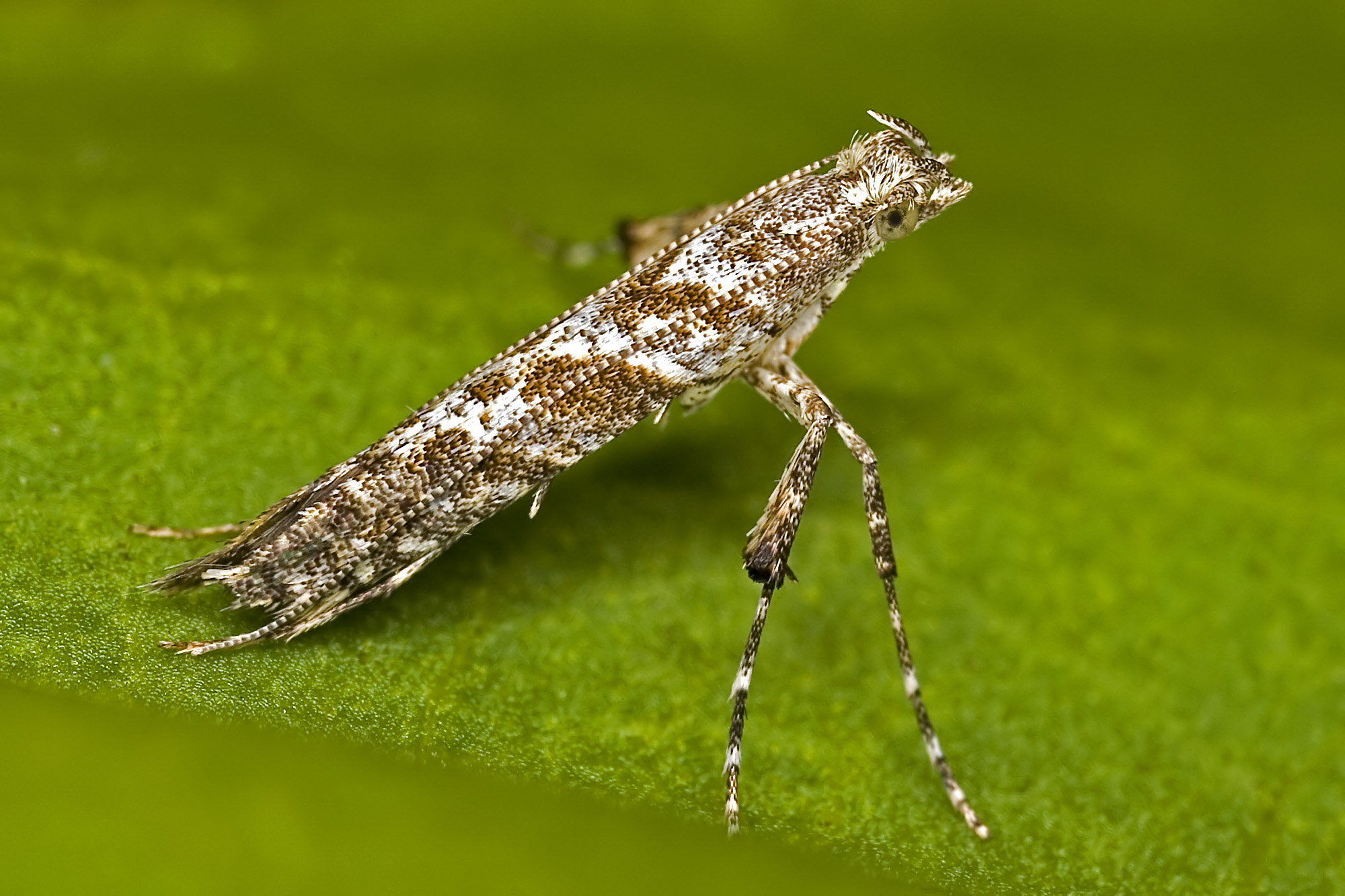
- Caloptilia cuculipennella

Scientific classification
- Kingdom: Animalia
- Phylum: Arthropoda
- Clade: Pancrustacea
- Class: Insecta
- Order: Lepidoptera
- Family: Gracillariidae
- Subfamily: Gracillariinae; Stainton, 1854

Genera
- See text

= Gracillariinae =

Subfamily of moths

Gracillariinae are a subfamily of moths which was described by Henry Tibbats Stainton in 1854.

== Genera ==
Gracillariidae phylogeny has been revised in 2017(Kawahara et al. 2017) and the Acrocercopinae subfamily is contains 25 genera (59 genera were affected to other subfamilies):

- Africephala Vári, 1986
- Apistoneura Vári, 1961
- Aristaea Meyrick, 1907
- Artifodina Kumata, 1985
- Aspilapteryx Spuler, 1910
  - =Sabulopteryx Triberti, 1985
- Caloptilia Hübner, 1825
  - =Poeciloptilia Hübner, 1825
  - =Ornix Collar, 1832
  - =Ornix Treitschke, 1833
  - =Coriscium Zeler, 1839
  - =Calliptilia Agassiz, 1847
  - =Timodora Meyrick, 1886
  - =Antiolopha Meyrick, 1894
  - =Sphyrophora Vári, 1961
  - =Phylloptilia Kumata, 1982
  - =Rhadinoptilia Kumata, 1982
  - =Minyoptilia Kumata, 1982
  - =Cecidoptilia Kumata, 1982
- Calybites Hübner, 1822
- Cryptologa T. B. Fletcher, 1921
- Cupedia Klimesch & Kumata, 1973
- Dextellia Triberti, 1986
- Ectropina Vári, 1961
- Epicnistis Meyrick, 1906
- Eucalybites Kumata, 1982
- Euprophantis Meyrick, 1921
- Eurytyla Meyrick, 1893
- Euspilapteryx Stephens, 1835
- Gracillaria Haworth, 1928
  - =Gracilaria Zeller, 1839
  - =Gracilaria Walsingham, 1907
  - =Xanthospilapteryx Spuler, 1910
- Ketapangia Kumata, 1995
- Macarostola Meyrick, 1907
- Neurolipa Ely, 1918
- Penica Walsingham, 1914
- Polymitia Triberti, 1986
- Synnympha Meyrick, 1915
- Systoloneura Vári, 1961

Moved genera:

- Genera moved to Acrocercopinae
  - Acrocercops Wallengren, 1881
  - Amblyptila Vári, 1961
  - Borboryctis Kumata & Kurokoo, 1988
  - Chilocampyla Busck, 1900
  - Chrysocercops Kumata & Kuroko, 1988
  - Corethrovalva Vári, 1961
  - Cryptolectica Vári, 1961
  - Dekeidoryxis Kumata, 1989
  - Deoptilia Kumata & Kuroko, 1988
  - Dialectica Walsingham, 1897
  - Eteoryctis Kumata & Kuroko, 1988
  - Eucosmophora Walsingham, 1897
  - Gibbovalva Kumata & Kuroko, 1988
  - Hypectopa Diakonoff, 1955
  - Lamprolectica Vári, 1961
  - Leucocercops Vári, 1961
  - Leucospilapteryx Spuler, 1910
  - Melanocercops Kumata & Kuroko, 1988
  - Metacercops Vári, 1961
  - Monocercops Kumata, 1989
  - Phodoryctis Kumata & Kuroko, 1988
  - Psydrocercops Kumata & Kuroko, 1988
  - Sauterina Kuznetzov, 1979
  - Schedocercops Vári, 1961
  - Spulerina Vári, 1961
  - Telamoptilia Kumata & Kuroko, 1988
  - Vihualpenia Mundaca, Parra & Vargas, 2013
- Genera moved to Lithocolletinae
  - Leucanthiza Clemens, 1859
- Genera moved to Marmarinae
  - Dendrorycter Kumata, 1978
  - Marmara Clemens, 1863
- Genera moved to Ornixolinae
  - Apophthisis Braun, 1915
  - Conopobathra Vári, 1961
  - Conopomorpha Meyrick, 1885
  - Conopomorphina Vári, 1961
  - Cuphodes Meyrick, 1897
  - Cyphosticha Meyrick, 1907
  - Diphtheroptila Vári, 1961
  - Dysectopa Vári, 1961
  - Epicephala Meyrick, 1980
    - =Iraina Diakonoff, 1955
    - =Leiocephala Kuznetzov & Baryschnikova, 2001
  - Leurocephala D.R. Davis & McKay, 2011
  - Liocrobyla Meyrick, 1916
  - Micrurapteryx Spuler, 1910
  - Neurobathra Ely, 1918
  - Neurostrota Ely, 1918
  - Oligoneurina Vári, 1961
  - Ornixola Kuznetzov, 1979
  - Pareclectis Meyrick, 1937
  - Parectopa Clemens, 1860
  - Philodoria Walsingham, 1907
    - =Euphilodoria Zimmermann, 1978
  - Phrixosceles Meyrick, 1908
  - Pogonocephala Vári, 1961
  - Polydema Vári, 1961
  - Polysoma Vári, 1961
  - Semnocera Vári, 1961
  - Spanioptila Walsingham, 1897
  - Spinivalva Moreira & Vargas, 2013
  - Stomphastis Meyrick, 1912
- Genera moved to Parornichinae
  - Callisto Stephens, 1834
    - =Annickia Gibeaux, 1990
  - Graphiocephala Vári, 1961
  - Parornix Spuler, 1910
    - =Alfaornix Kuznetzov, 1979
    - =Betaornix Kuznetzov, 1979
    - =Deltaornix Kuznetzov, 1979
    - =Gammaornix Kuznetzov, 1979
  - Pleiomorpha Vári, 1961
