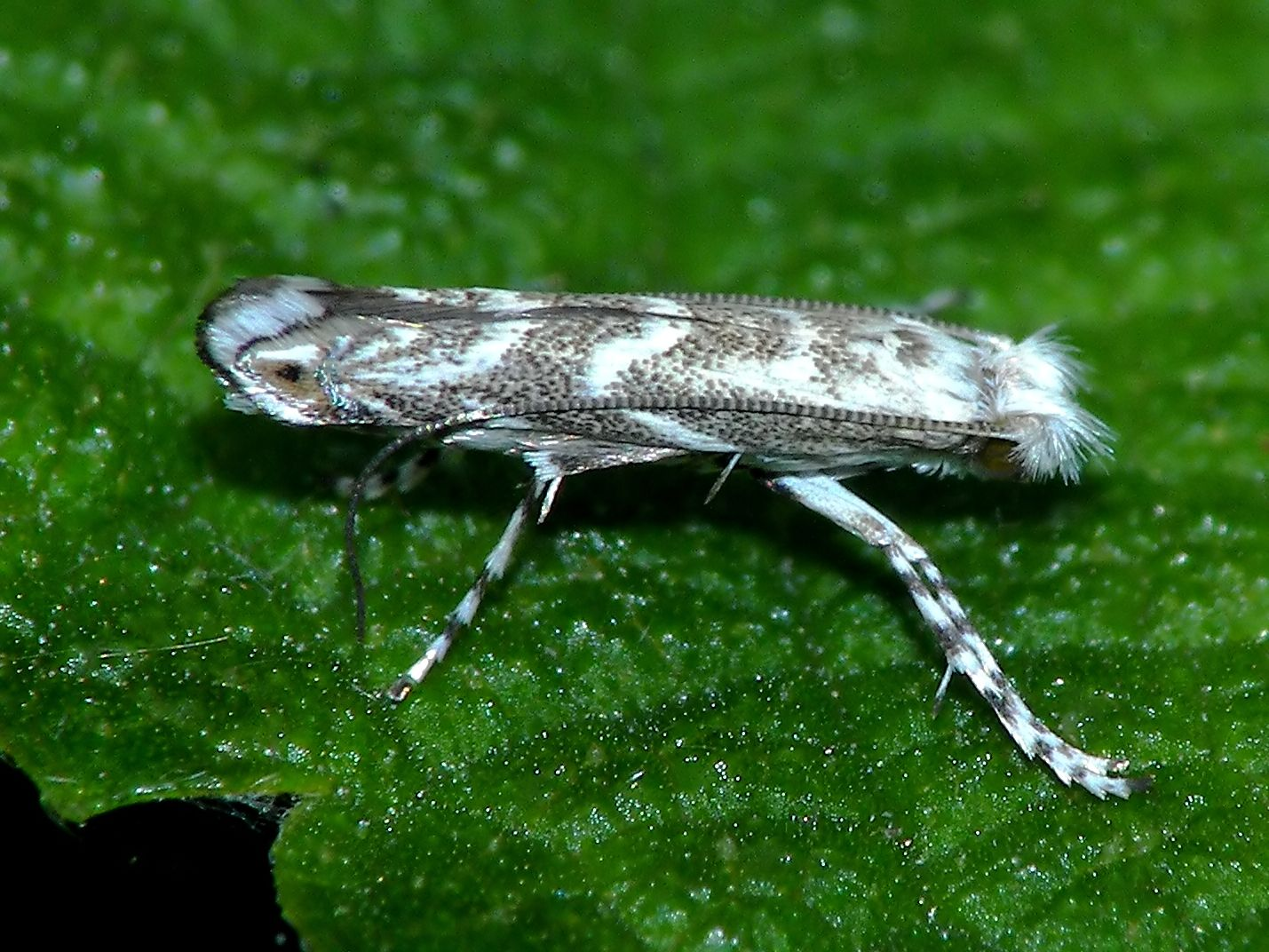
- Epicephala albifrons

Scientific classification
- Domain: Eukaryota
- Kingdom: Animalia
- Phylum: Arthropoda
- Class: Insecta
- Order: Lepidoptera
- Family: Gracillariidae
- Subfamily: Ornixolinae; Kuznetzov & Baryshnikova, 2001

Genera
- 28, see text

= Ornixolinae =

Subfamily of moths

Ornixolinae is a subfamily of moths described by Vladimir Ivanovitsch Kuznetzov and Svetlana Vladimirovna Baryshnikova in 2001.

== Genera ==
In alphabetical order:

- Apophthisis Braun, 1915
- Chileoptilia Vargas & Landry, 2005
- Conopobathra Vári, 1961
- Conopomorpha Meyrick, 1885
- Conopomorphina Vári, 1961
- Cuphodes Meyrick, 1897
- Cyphosticha Meyrick, 1907
- Diphtheroptila Vári, 1961
- Dysectopa Vári, 1961
- Epicephala Meyrick, 1980
  - =Iraina Diakonoff, 1955
  - =Leiocephala Kuznetzov & Baryschnikova, 2001
- Leurocephala D.R. Davis & McKay, 2011
- Liocrobyla Meyrick, 1916
- Micrurapteryx Spuler, 1910
- Neurobathra Ely, 1918
- Neurostrota Ely, 1918
- Oligoneurina Vári, 1961
- Ornixola Kuznetzov, 1979
- Pareclectis Meyrick, 1937
- Parectopa Clemens, 1860
- Philodoria Walsingham, 1907
  - =Euphilodoria Zimmermann, 1978
- Phrixosceles Meyrick, 1908
- Pogonocephala Vári, 1961
- Polydema Vári, 1961
- Polysoma Vári, 1961
- Semnocera Vári, 1961
- Spanioptila Walsingham, 1897
- Spinivalva Moreira & Vargas, 2013
- Stomphastis Meyrick, 1912
