= Pleiomorpha homotypa =

Scientific classification
- Domain: Eukaryota
- Kingdom: Animalia
- Phylum: Arthropoda
- Class: Insecta
- Order: Lepidoptera
- Family: Gracillariidae
- Genus: Pleiomorpha
- Species: P. homotypa

Binomial name
- Pleiomorpha homotypa Vári, 1961

Species of moth

Pleiomorpha homotypa is a moth of the family Gracillariidae. It is found in South Africa.

The larvae feed on Diospyros lycioides. They mine the leaves of their host plant. The mine has the form of a small, oblong, transparent, tentiform mine along the mid-rib.
