= Pleiomorpha eumeces =

Scientific classification
- Kingdom: Animalia
- Phylum: Arthropoda
- Class: Insecta
- Order: Lepidoptera
- Family: Gracillariidae
- Genus: Pleiomorpha
- Species: P. eumeces

Binomial name
- Pleiomorpha eumeces Vári, 1961

Species of moth

Pleiomorpha eumeces is a moth of the family Gracillariidae. It is known from South Africa.

The larvae feed on Diospyros lycioides and Royena pallens. They probably mine the leaves of their host plant.
