= Cryptologa =

Scientific classification
- Kingdom: Animalia
- Phylum: Arthropoda
- Class: Insecta
- Order: Lepidoptera
- Family: Gracillariidae
- Subfamily: Gracillariinae
- Genus: Cryptologa; T. B. Fletcher, 1921

Species
- See text

Genus of moths

Cryptologa is a genus of moths in the family Gracillariidae. It was described by Thomas Bainbrigge Fletcher in 1921.

== Species ==
- Cryptologa nystalea T. B. Fletcher, 1921
