= Pleiomorpha dystacta =

Scientific classification
- Kingdom: Animalia
- Phylum: Arthropoda
- Class: Insecta
- Order: Lepidoptera
- Family: Gracillariidae
- Genus: Pleiomorpha
- Species: P. dystacta

Binomial name
- Pleiomorpha dystacta Vári, 1961

Species of moth

Pleiomorpha dystacta is a moth of the family Gracillariidae. It is known from South Africa.
