= Liocrobyla minima =

Scientific classification
- Kingdom: Animalia
- Phylum: Arthropoda
- Class: Insecta
- Order: Lepidoptera
- Family: Gracillariidae
- Genus: Liocrobyla
- Species: L. minima

Binomial name
- Liocrobyla minima (Noreika, 1992)

Synonyms
- Micrurupteryx minima Noreika, 1992

Species of moth

Liocrobyla minima is a moth of the family Gracillariidae. It is known from Tajikistan and Turkmenistan
