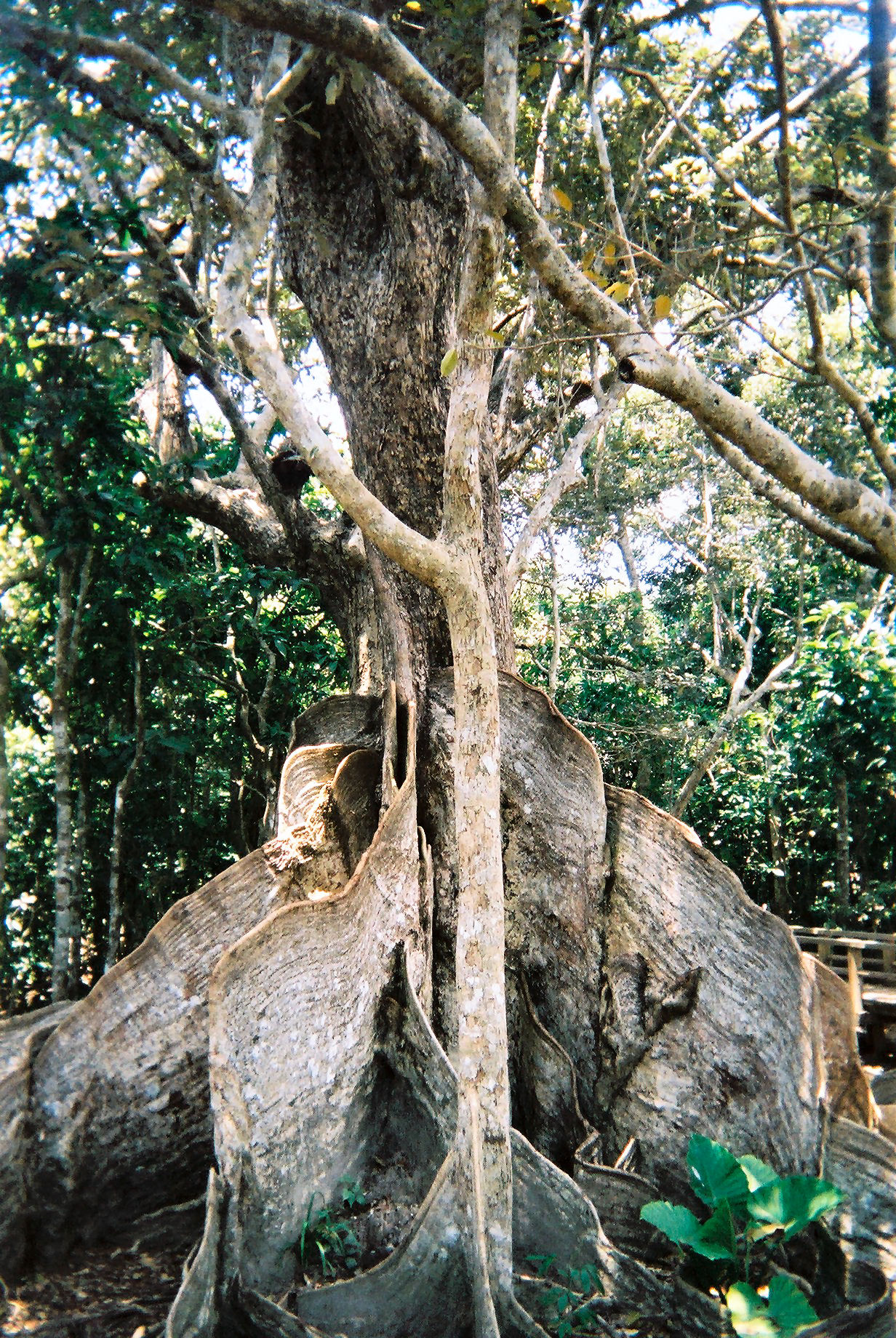
- The distinctive ribbon-like buttress roots

Conservation status
- Least Concern (IUCN 3.1)

Scientific classification
- Kingdom: Plantae
- Clade: Tracheophytes
- Clade: Angiosperms
- Clade: Eudicots
- Clade: Rosids
- Order: Malvales
- Family: Malvaceae
- Genus: Heritiera
- Species: H. littoralis

Binomial name
- Heritiera littoralis Aiton

Synonyms
- Amygdalus litoralis (Aiton) Kuntze; Balanopteris minor Gaertn.; Balanopteris tothila Gaertn.; Heritiera fischeri Regel & Rach; Heritiera minor (Gaertn.) Lam.; Heritiera tothila Kurz; Sutherlandia littoralis (Aiton) J.F.Gmel.; Systemon fischeri Regel; Samadera littoralis (Aiton) Oken

= Heritiera littoralis =

Looking-glass mangrove

Species of mangrove tree

Heritiera littoralis, commonly known as the looking-glass mangrove or tulip mangrove, is a mangrove tree in the family Malvaceae native to coastal areas of eastern Africa, Asia, Melanesia and northern Australia. The common name refers to the silvery appearance of the underside of the leaves, resembling a mirror to some degree. The strong timber has uses in marine applications and elsewhere.

== Description ==
Heritiera littoralis is an evergreen tree growing up to 25 m (82 ft) in height with very prominent, sinuous buttress roots that may be up to 1 m (3 ft 3 in) tall. It is usually low-branching and the crown is untidy-looking with gnarled branches. The trunk is light grey or grey-brown in appearance, smooth when young but developing vertical fissures as it ages.

The leaves are spirally arranged on the branches and varyingly measure from 20 by 10 centimetres (7.9 by 3.9 in) up to 30 by 15 centimetres (11.8 by 5.9 in), with a petiole up to 2 cm (0.79 in) long. They are oblong-elliptical to ovate-elliptical, dark green on the upper surface and the undersides are silvery-white to light brown due to the presence of stellate scales.

The inflorescences are axillary panicles, and as this species is monoecious, they bear both pistillate (functionally female) and staminate (functionally male) flowers on the same plant. The flowers have a fused perianth tube with usually 5 teeth and are bell-shaped (hence the common name Tulip oak). They are greenish-pink or dull purple, around 6 mm (0.24 in) wide and long.

The fruit is a flattened, ellipsoid, indehiscent, brown woody pod which is derived from the carpel, and contains a single seed. It has a distinctive oblique keel on the uppermost side and measures up to 10 cm (3.9 in) long by 6 cm (2.4 in) wide. The fruit can float for several weeks and so is able to take advantage of tides, currents and winds to aid in its dispersal.

== Taxonomy ==
This species was first described by the Scottish botanist William Aiton in 1789, who at the time was the director of the botanical garden at Kew. The description was published in the third volume of his work Hortus Kewensis, in which he also raised the genus Heritiera.

=== Subspecies ===
The Global Biodiversity Information Facility recognises two infraspecies, Heritiera littoralis subsp. littoralis, and Heritiera littoralis subsp. fischeri, while Plants of the World Online does not recognise any.

=== Etymology ===
The genus name Heritiera was given in honour of the French botanist Charles Louis L'Héritier de Brutelle. The species epithet litoralis means "by the sea" in reference to the habitat of this plant.

=== Vernacular names ===
Regional common names for the tree include:

- Bengali – sundari (সুন্দরী, সুন্দরি)
- Bahasa Indonesia – dungun kecil, dungun laut
- Filipino – dungon
- Hindi – sundari (सुंदरी)
- Japanese – sakishimasuōnoki (サキシマスオウノキ)
- Chinese Mandrin – Yinyeshu（银叶树）
- Kannada – chanda mara (ಚಂದ ಮರ)
- Malay – pokok dungun
- Malayalam – mukuram (മുകുരം)
- Marathi – sundari (सुंदरी)
- Odia – sundari (ସୁନ୍ଦରୀ)
- Sinhala – etuna (ඇටුන), ho mediriya (හෝ මැදිරිය)
- Tamil – conmuntiri (சொன்முந்திரி), cuntari (சுந்தரி)
- Tongan – mamaea
- Vietnamese – cui biển
- Visayan – dungon
- Maldivian – ކަހަރުވައް (kaharuvah)
- Chamorro - ufa

== Distribution and habitat ==
Heritiera littoralis's natural range is eastern Africa, Madagascar, India, Southeast Asia, Melanesia and the Northern Territory and Queensland in Australia. It grows in the landward edges of mangrove forests and along riverine forests at elevations close to sea level.

== Ecology ==
This species is host for the larvae of a number of lepidopterans including: Arhopala micale, Arhopala pseudocentaurus, Assara seminivale, Hymenoptychis sordida and Synnympha perfrenis.

== Uses ==
The tree is harvested for timber and is valued for its toughness, durability, and resistance to saltwater. It is commonly used in shipbuilding and for pilings, bridges, wharves, furniture and housing. When sufficiently straight and high, the trunk has been used for ship's masts.

The fruit of species in the genus is used in Philippine cuisine to neutralize the fishy taste in kinilaw, a local dish of raw fish in vinegar or citrus juices. Another species used this way is the fruits of the tabon-tabon tree (Atuna excelsa subsp. racemosa, syn. Atuna racemosa).

Extracts of the plant were traditionally used to treat diarrhea and dysentery, while the sap was used as a fish poison, arrowhead poison, and spearhead poison. In the Nicobar and Andaman islands, the plant's leaves and seeds are regarded as edible. Twigs have been used to clean teeth and for chewing.

== Gallery ==
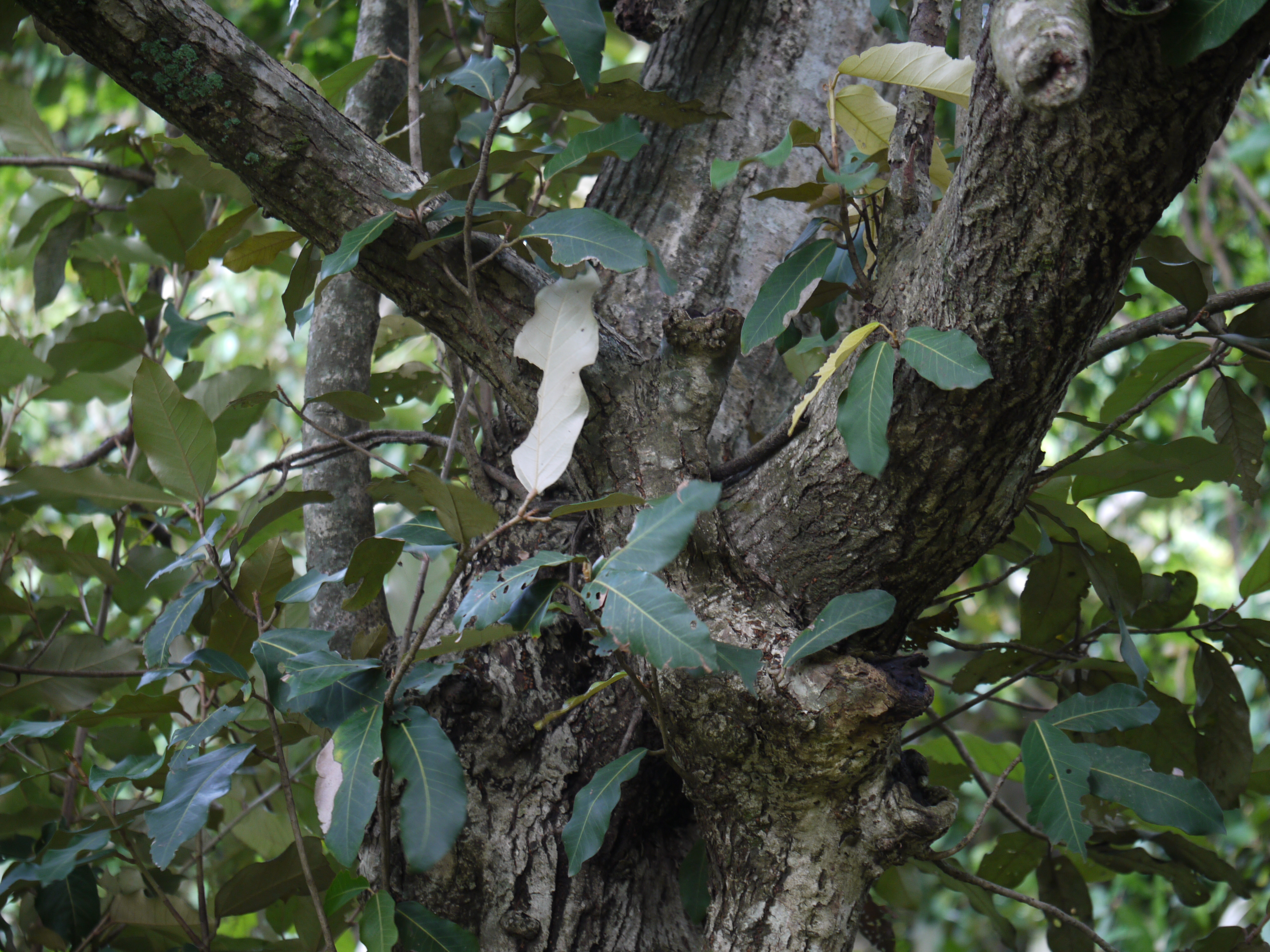
Trunk and bark

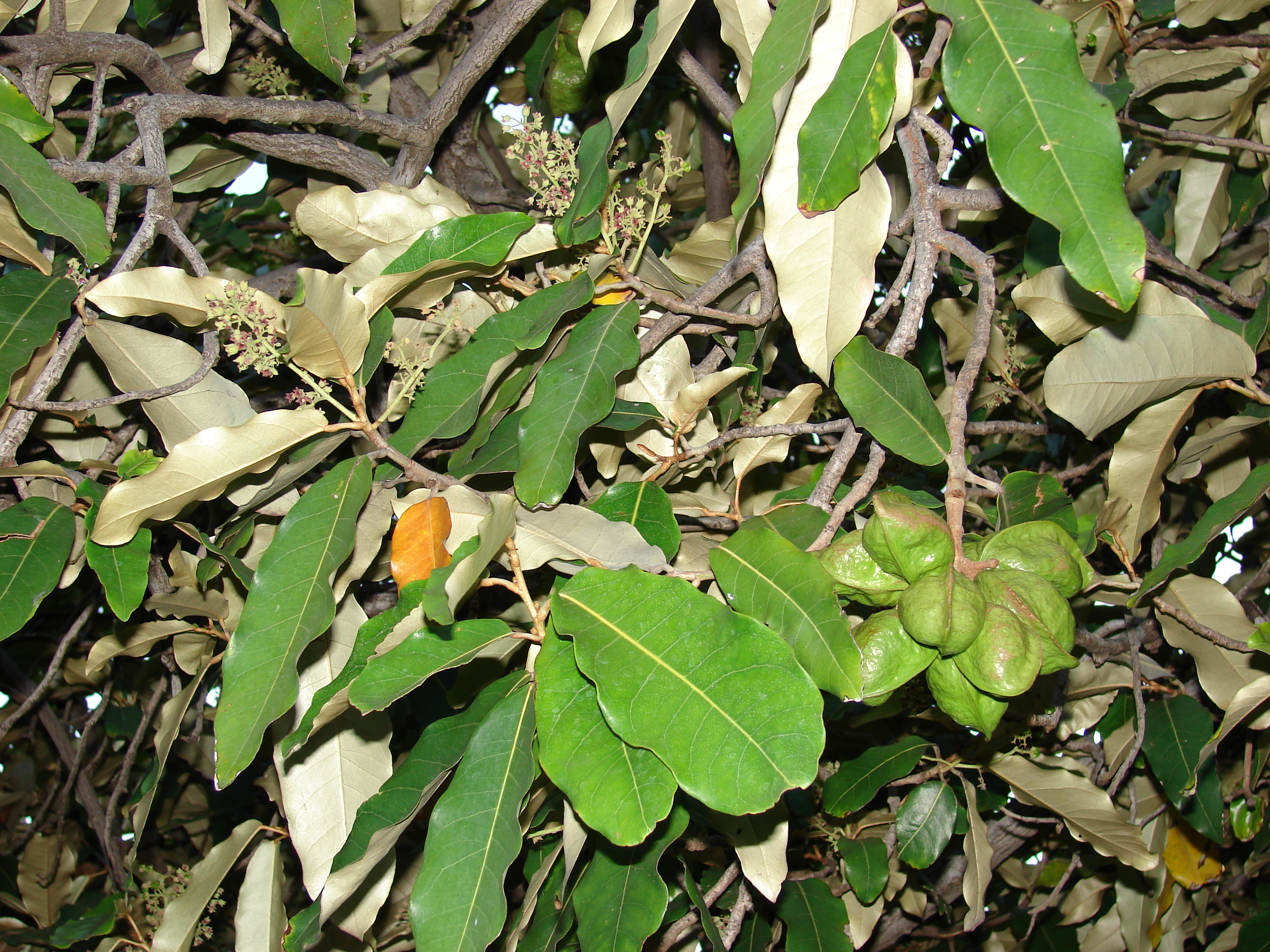
Foliage, flowers and unripe fruit

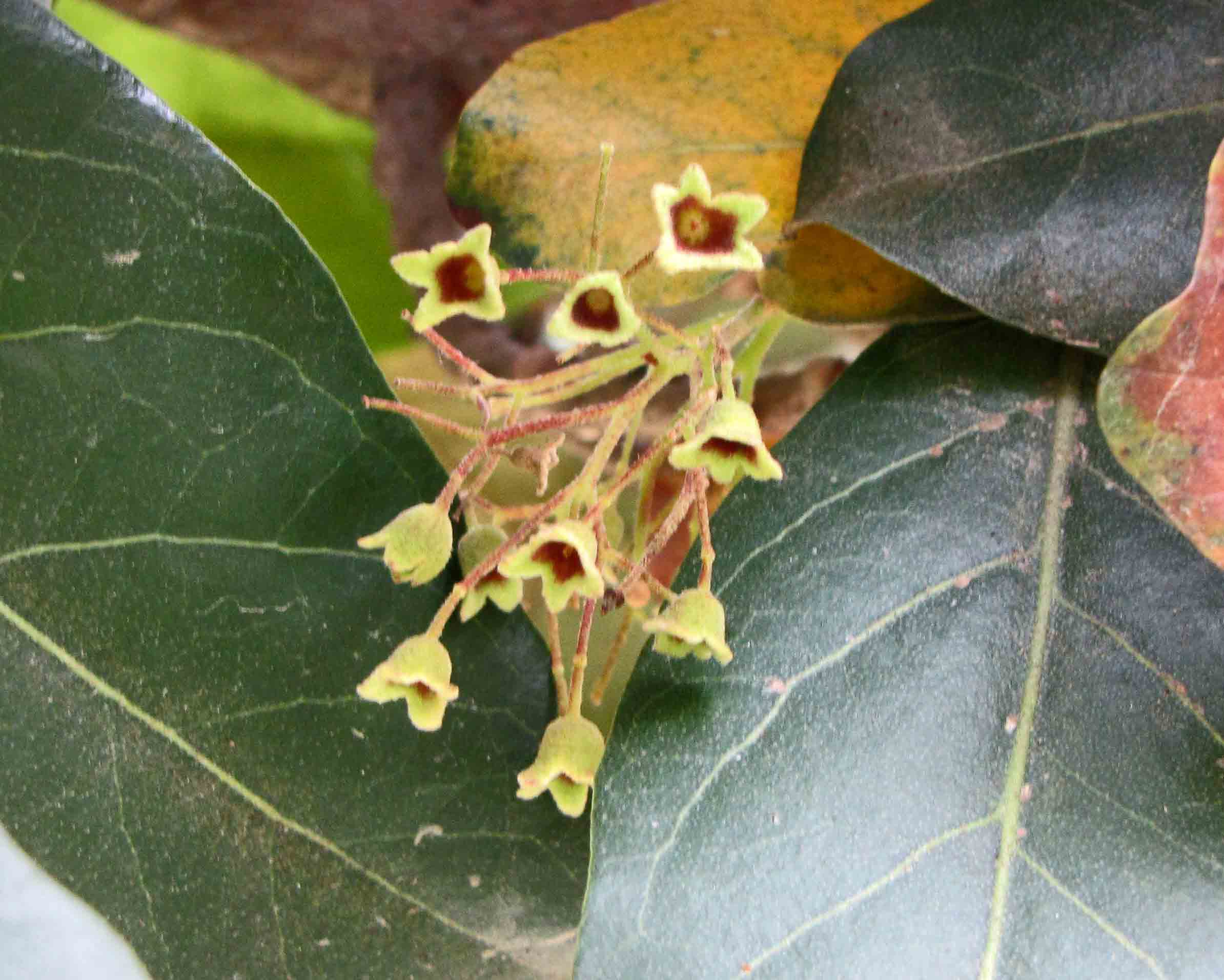
Flowers

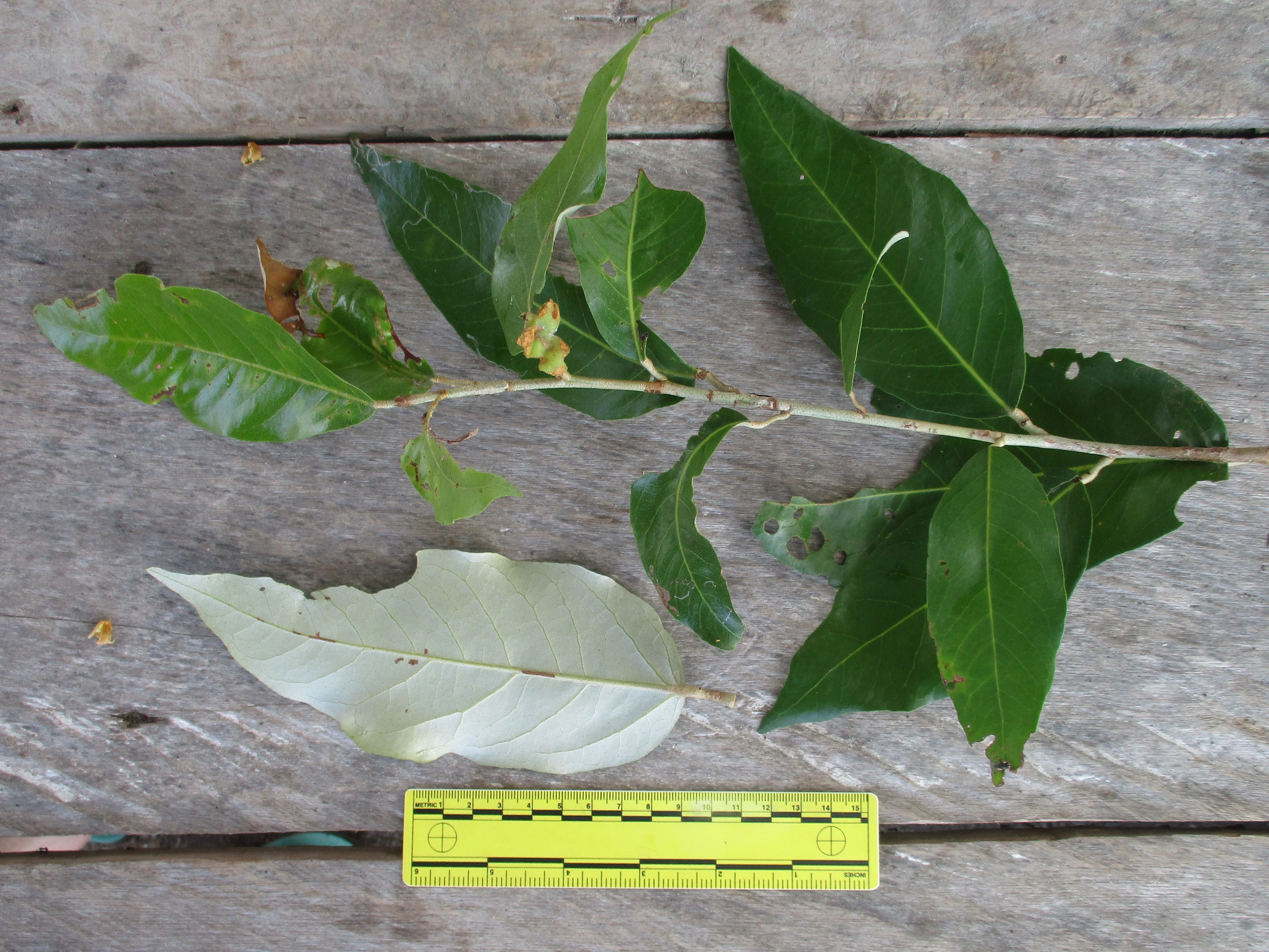
Leaf detail

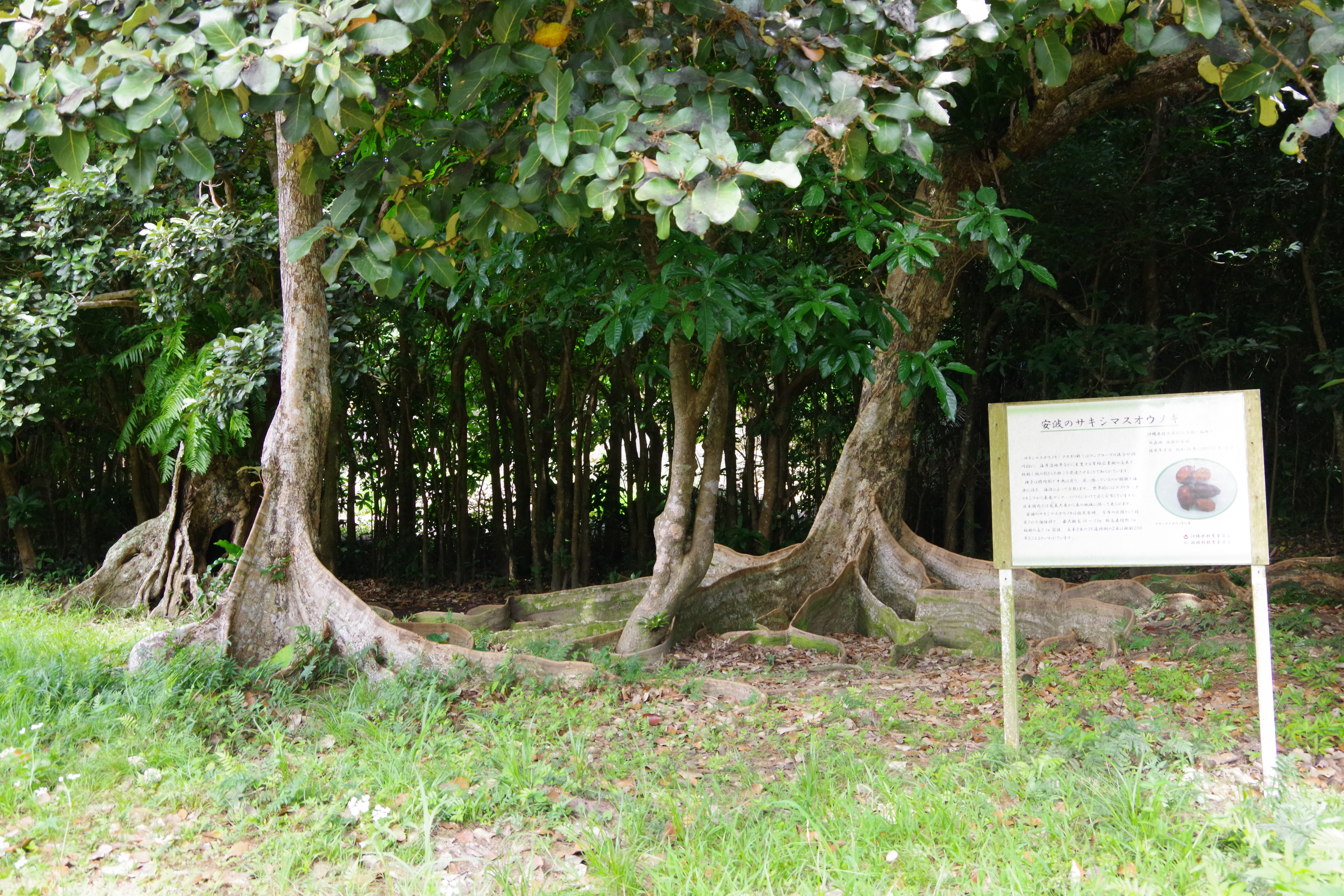
Buttress roots

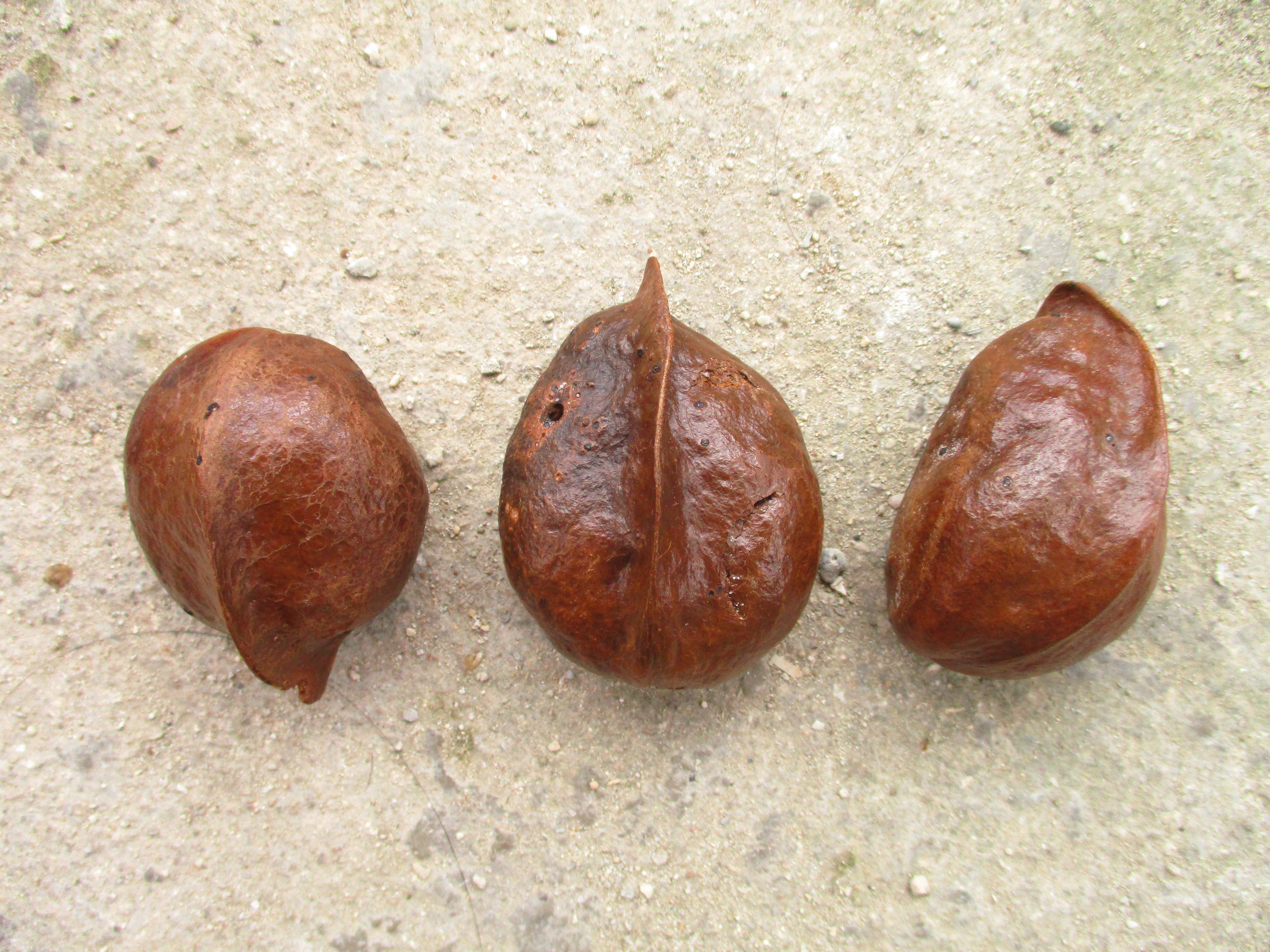
Mature fruit

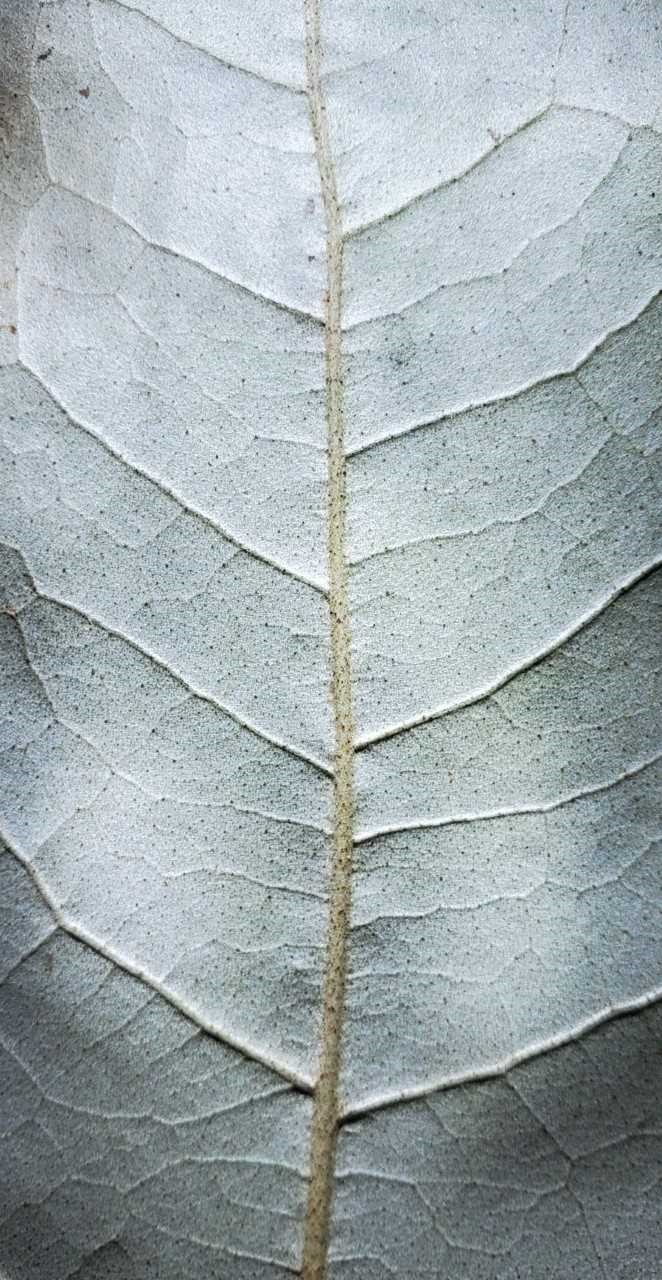
Underside of leaf

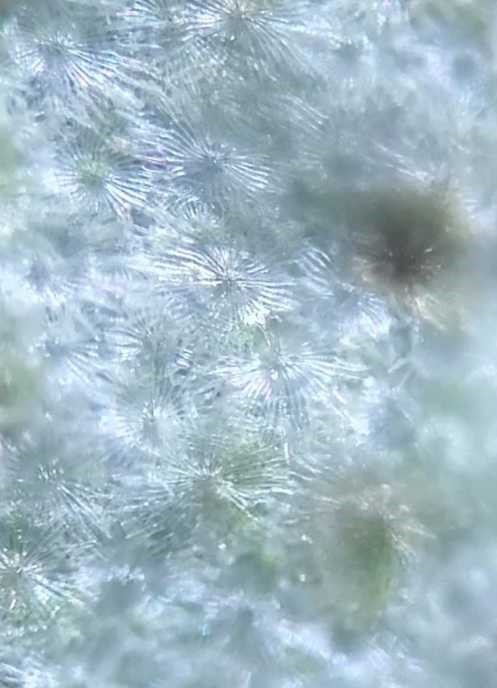
Stellate scales on leaf underside
