= Pleiomorpha symmetra =

Scientific classification
- Kingdom: Animalia
- Phylum: Arthropoda
- Class: Insecta
- Order: Lepidoptera
- Family: Gracillariidae
- Genus: Pleiomorpha
- Species: P. symmetra

Binomial name
- Pleiomorpha symmetra Vári, 1961

Species of moth

Pleiomorpha symmetra is a moth of the family Gracillariidae. It is known from South Africa.
