= Polydema vansoni =

Scientific classification
- Kingdom: Animalia
- Phylum: Arthropoda
- Class: Insecta
- Order: Lepidoptera
- Family: Gracillariidae
- Genus: Polydema
- Species: P. vansoni

Binomial name
- Polydema vansoni Vári, 1961

Species of moth

Polydema vansoni is a species of moth in the family Gracillariidae. It is found in South Africa.
