= Diphtheroptila oxyloga =

Scientific classification
- Kingdom: Animalia
- Phylum: Arthropoda
- Class: Insecta
- Order: Lepidoptera
- Family: Gracillariidae
- Genus: Diphtheroptila
- Species: D. oxyloga

Binomial name
- Diphtheroptila oxyloga Meyrick, 1928

Synonyms
- Acrocercops oxyloga Meyrick, 1928

Species of moth

Diphtheroptila oxyloga is a moth of the family Gracillariidae. It is known from South Africa and Zimbabwe.

The larvae feed on Bridelia species. They probably mine the leaves of their host plant.
