= Liocrobyla paraschista =

Scientific classification
- Kingdom: Animalia
- Phylum: Arthropoda
- Class: Insecta
- Order: Lepidoptera
- Family: Gracillariidae
- Genus: Liocrobyla
- Species: L. paraschista

Binomial name
- Liocrobyla paraschista Meyrick, 1916

Species of moth

Liocrobyla paraschista is a moth of the family Gracillariidae. It is known from Fiji, India (Bihar and Karnataka) and Japan (Hokkaidō, Honshū and Kyūshū) and Korea.

The wingspan is 6–7 mm.

The larvae feed on Butea monosperma, Cajanus cajan, Desmodium caudatum, Desmodium gangeticum, Desmodium oldhamii, Desmodium podocarpum, Flemingia lineata, Lespedeza cyrtobotrya and Millettia species. They mine the leaves of their host plant.
