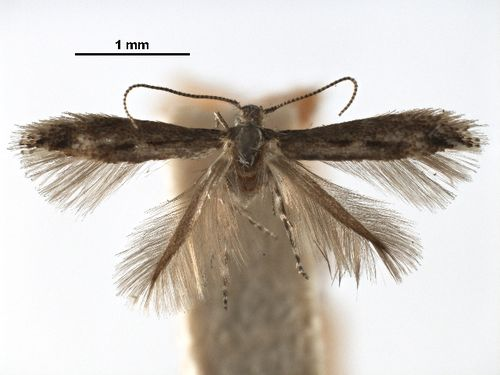

Scientific classification
- Kingdom: Animalia
- Phylum: Arthropoda
- Clade: Pancrustacea
- Class: Insecta
- Order: Lepidoptera
- Family: Gracillariidae
- Genus: Apophthisis
- Species: A. pullata

Binomial name
- Apophthisis pullata Braun, 1915

= Apophthisis pullata =

Species of moth

Apophthisis pullata is a moth of the family Gracillariidae. It is known from Ohio, United States.
