= Calybites hauderi =

Scientific classification
- Domain: Eukaryota
- Kingdom: Animalia
- Phylum: Arthropoda
- Class: Insecta
- Order: Lepidoptera
- Family: Gracillariidae
- Genus: Calybites
- Species: C. hauderi

Binomial name
- Calybites hauderi Rebel, 1906

Synonyms
- Caloptilia hauderi (Rebel, 1906)

Species of moth

Calybites hauderi is a moth of the family Gracillariidae. It is known from Romania and the Pyrenees, but is very rare and local. The records of this species in Great Britain and Belgium were due to the confusion with another species, Caloptilia onustella.

The wingspan is about 10 mm. Adults are on wing in July and August, overwintering as an adult.

The larvae feed on Acer campestre. They mine the leaves of their host plant.
