= Systoloneura randiae =

Scientific classification
- Kingdom: Animalia
- Phylum: Arthropoda
- Clade: Pancrustacea
- Class: Insecta
- Order: Lepidoptera
- Family: Gracillariidae
- Genus: Systoloneura
- Species: S. randiae

Binomial name
- Systoloneura randiae Vári, 1961

Species of moth

Systoloneura randiae is a moth of the family Gracillariidae. It is known from South Africa.

The larvae feed on Coddia rudis. They probably mine the leaves of their host plant.
