= Calybites trimaculata =

Scientific classification
- Kingdom: Animalia
- Phylum: Arthropoda
- Class: Insecta
- Order: Lepidoptera
- Family: Gracillariidae
- Genus: Calybites
- Species: C. trimaculata

Binomial name
- Calybites trimaculata Kumata, 1982

Species of moth

Calybites trimaculata is a moth of the family Gracillariidae. It is known from Japan (Shikoku island and the Ryukyu Islands).

The wingspan is 7-8.5 mm.

The larvae feed on Persicaria chinensis. They mine the leaves of their host plant.
