= Systoloneura =

Scientific classification
- Kingdom: Animalia
- Phylum: Arthropoda
- Class: Insecta
- Order: Lepidoptera
- Family: Gracillariidae
- Subfamily: Gracillariinae
- Genus: Systoloneura; Vári, 1961

Species
- See text

Genus of moths

Systoloneura is a genus of moths in the family Gracillariidae.

== Species ==
- Systoloneura geometropis (Meyrick, 1936)
- Systoloneura randiae Vári, 1961
