= Calybites quadrisignella =

Scientific classification
- Kingdom: Animalia
- Phylum: Arthropoda
- Clade: Pancrustacea
- Class: Insecta
- Order: Lepidoptera
- Family: Gracillariidae
- Genus: Calybites
- Species: C. quadrisignella

Binomial name
- Calybites quadrisignella (Zeller, 1839)

Synonyms
- Gracilaria quadrisignella Zeller, 1839

Species of moth

Calybites quadrisignella is a moth of the family Gracillariidae. It is found in Central and Eastern Europe.

The larvae feed on Rhamnus catharticus, Rhamnus frangula, Rhamnus imeritinus and Rhamnus saxatilis tinctorius. They mine the leaves of their host plant.
