= Apistoneura psarochroma =

Scientific classification
- Kingdom: Animalia
- Phylum: Arthropoda
- Class: Insecta
- Order: Lepidoptera
- Family: Gracillariidae
- Genus: Apistoneura
- Species: A. psarochroma

Binomial name
- Apistoneura psarochroma Vári, 1961

Species of moth

Apistoneura psarochroma is a moth of the family Gracillariidae. It is known from Namibia and Zimbabwe.
