= Conopomorphina aptata =

Scientific classification
- Kingdom: Animalia
- Phylum: Arthropoda
- Clade: Pancrustacea
- Class: Insecta
- Order: Lepidoptera
- Family: Gracillariidae
- Genus: Conopomorphina
- Species: C. aptata

Binomial name
- Conopomorphina aptata (Meyrick, 1914)

Synonyms
- Acrocercops aptata Meyrick, 1914; Conopomorphina acmophanes Meyrick, 1928

Species of moth

Conopomorphina aptata is a moth of the family Gracillariidae. It is known from South Africa.

The larvae feed on Randia rudis (Rubiaceae). They probably mine the leaves of their host plant.
