= Synnympha =

Scientific classification
- Kingdom: Animalia
- Phylum: Arthropoda
- Class: Insecta
- Order: Lepidoptera
- Family: Gracillariidae
- Subfamily: Gracillariinae
- Genus: Synnympha; Meyrick, 1915

Species
- See text

Genus of moths

Synnympha is a genus of moths in the family Gracillariidae.

== Species ==
- Synnympha diluviata Meyrick, 1915
- Synnympha perfrenis Meyrick, 1920
