= Synnympha diluviata =

Scientific classification
- Kingdom: Animalia
- Phylum: Arthropoda
- Class: Insecta
- Order: Lepidoptera
- Family: Gracillariidae
- Genus: Synnympha
- Species: S. diluviata

Binomial name
- Synnympha diluviata Meyrick, 1915

Species of moth

Synnympha diluviata is a moth of the family Gracillariidae. It is found in Sri Lanka.
