= Cryptologa nystalea =

Scientific classification
- Kingdom: Animalia
- Phylum: Arthropoda
- Class: Insecta
- Order: Lepidoptera
- Family: Gracillariidae
- Genus: Cryptologa
- Species: C. nystalea

Binomial name
- Cryptologa nystalea T. B. Fletcher, 1921

Synonyms
- Cryptologa nystalea Meyrick, 1932

Species of moth

Cryptologa nystalea is a moth of the family Gracillariidae described by Thomas Bainbrigge Fletcher in 1921. It is known from Karnataka and Maharashtra in India.

The larvae feed on Pongamia pinnata. They probably mine the leaves of their host plant.
