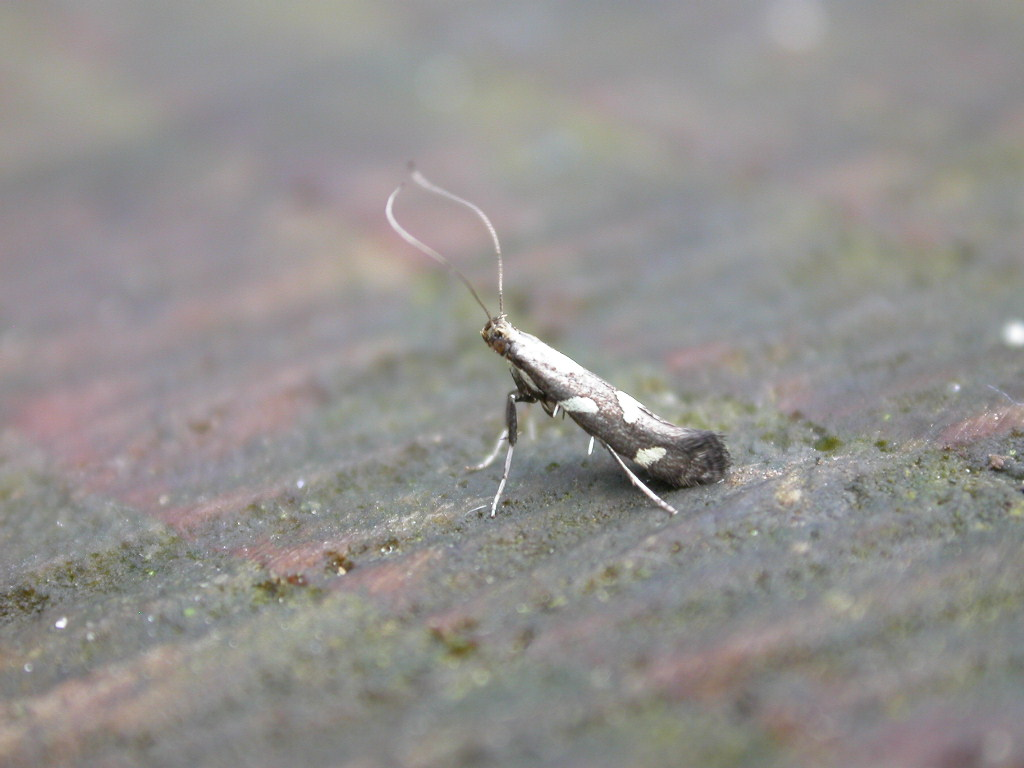

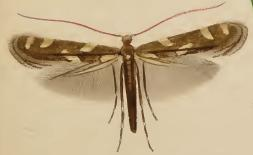

Scientific classification
- Domain: Eukaryota
- Kingdom: Animalia
- Phylum: Arthropoda
- Class: Insecta
- Order: Lepidoptera
- Family: Gracillariidae
- Genus: Calybites
- Species: C. phasianipennella

Binomial name
- Calybites phasianipennella (Hübner, [1813])

Synonyms
- Tinea phasianipennella Hubner, 1813; Gracilaria quadruplella Zeller, 1839; Gracilaria isograpta Meyrick, 1928; Calybites isograpta

= Calybites phasianipennella =

Species of moth

Calybites phasianipennella is a moth of the family Gracillariidae. It is known from all of Europe and most of Asia.

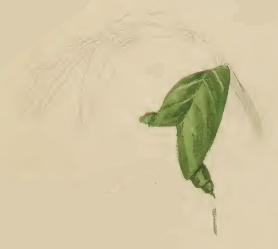
a sprig of Polygonum hydropiper with a leaf cut and rolled up into two cones by the larva

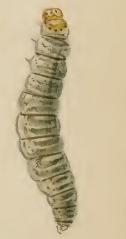
Larva

The wingspan is 10–11 mm. The forewings are dark fuscous; three costal spots at 1/3, and 3/4 before apex, and two dorsal spots at 1/4 and 1/2 ochreous-whitish, more or less dark-margined, often very indistinct. Hindwings rather dark grey. The larva is greenish -grey; dorsal line darker; head yellowish, black-spotted; segment 2 with yellowish plate and four black spots.

Adults are on wing in September and overwinters as an adult, after which it can be found to April or May.

The larvae feed on Chenopodium hybridum, Fallopia aubertii, Fallopia convolvulus, Lysimachia vulgaris, Lythrum salicaria, Oxyria digyna, Persicaria amphibia, Persicaria hydropiper, Persicaria lapathifolia, Persicaria maculosa, common sorrel (Rumex acetosa), sheep's sorrel (Rumex acetosella), Rumex aquaticus, Rumex hydrolapathum and Rumex obtusifolius. They mine the leaves of their host plant. The mine starts as an epidermal corridor, later it becomes a pale and later brown.
