= Pogonocephala veneranda =

Scientific classification
- Kingdom: Animalia
- Phylum: Arthropoda
- Class: Insecta
- Order: Lepidoptera
- Family: Gracillariidae
- Genus: Pogonocephala
- Species: P. veneranda

Binomial name
- Pogonocephala veneranda (Meyrick, 1909)

Synonyms
- Epicephala veneranda Meyrick, 1909

Species of moth

Pogonocephala veneranda is a moth of the family Gracillariidae. It is known from South Africa.
