= Eurytyla =

Scientific classification
- Kingdom: Animalia
- Phylum: Arthropoda
- Class: Insecta
- Order: Lepidoptera
- Family: Gracillariidae
- Subfamily: Gracillariinae
- Genus: Eurytyla; Meyrick, 1893

Species
- See text

Genus of moths

Eurytyla is a genus of moths in the family Gracillariidae.

== Species ==
- Eurytyla automacha Meyrick, 1893
