= Penica peritheta =

Scientific classification
- Kingdom: Animalia
- Phylum: Arthropoda
- Class: Insecta
- Order: Lepidoptera
- Family: Gracillariidae
- Genus: Penica
- Species: P. peritheta

Binomial name
- Penica peritheta Walsingham, 1914

Species of moth

Penica peritheta is a moth of the family Gracillariidae. It is known from Mexico.
