= Spanioptila spinosum =

Scientific classification
- Kingdom: Animalia
- Phylum: Arthropoda
- Class: Insecta
- Order: Lepidoptera
- Family: Gracillariidae
- Genus: Spanioptila
- Species: S. spinosum

Binomial name
- Spanioptila spinosum Walsingham, 1897

Species of moth

Spanioptila spinosum is a species of moth of the family Gracillariidae. It is known from Cuba, Puerto Rico and Saint Thomas, U.S. Virgin Islands.

The larvae feed on Casearia hirsuta. They mine the leaves of their host plant.
