= Eucalybites aureola =

Scientific classification
- Kingdom: Animalia
- Phylum: Arthropoda
- Class: Insecta
- Order: Lepidoptera
- Family: Gracillariidae
- Genus: Eucalybites
- Species: E. aureola

Binomial name
- Eucalybites aureola Kumata, 1982

Species of moth

Eucalybites aureola is a moth of the family Gracillariidae. It is known from Hokkaidō island of Japan and the Kuril Islands.

The wingspan is 8-10.2 mm.

The larvae feed on Hypericum erectum. They mine the leaves of their host plant.
