= Liocrobyla tephrosiae =

Scientific classification
- Kingdom: Animalia
- Phylum: Arthropoda
- Class: Insecta
- Order: Lepidoptera
- Family: Gracillariidae
- Genus: Liocrobyla
- Species: L. tephrosiae

Binomial name
- Liocrobyla tephrosiae Vári, 1961

Species of moth

Liocrobyla tephrosiae is a moth of the family Gracillariidae. It is known from South Africa.

The larvae feed on Tephrosia polystachya. They mine the leaves of their host plant.
