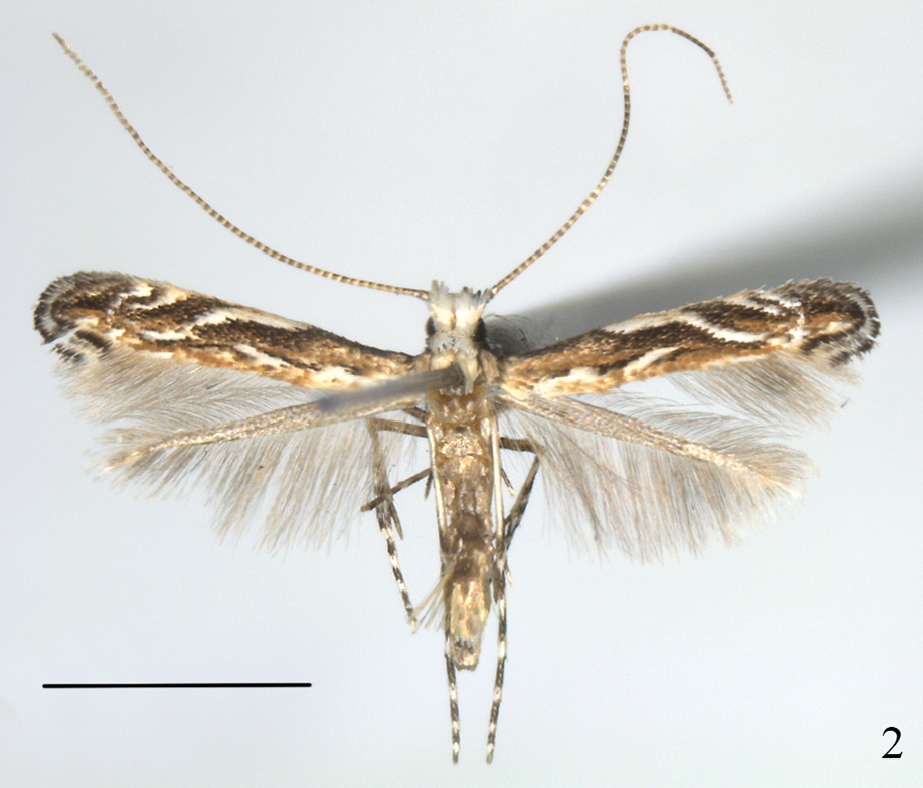

Scientific classification
- Kingdom: Animalia
- Phylum: Arthropoda
- Class: Insecta
- Order: Lepidoptera
- Family: Gracillariidae
- Genus: Liocrobyla
- Species: L. lobata

Binomial name
- Liocrobyla lobata Kuroko, 1960

= Liocrobyla lobata =

Species of moth

Liocrobyla lobata is a moth of the family Gracillariidae. It is known from Japan (Hokkaidō, Honshū and Kyūshū) and Korea.

The wingspan is 6–7 mm.

The larvae feed on Pueraria species, including Pueraria montana. They mine the leaves of their host plant.
