= Dextellia dorsilineella =

Scientific classification
- Kingdom: Animalia
- Phylum: Arthropoda
- Class: Insecta
- Order: Lepidoptera
- Family: Gracillariidae
- Genus: Dextellia
- Species: D. dorsilineella

Binomial name
- Dextellia dorsilineella (Amsel, 1935)

Synonyms
- Leucospilapteryx dorsilineella Amsel, 1935; Dextellia dorsiliniella Kuznetzov & Baryshnikova, 2001

Species of moth

Dextellia dorsilineella is a moth of the family Gracillariidae. It is known from Spain, Italy, Greece, Malta, Turkmenistan, Israel, the Palestinian Territory, as well as Morocco and Tunisia.
