= Apophthisis congregata =

Scientific classification
- Kingdom: Animalia
- Phylum: Arthropoda
- Class: Insecta
- Order: Lepidoptera
- Family: Gracillariidae
- Genus: Apophthisis
- Species: A. congregata

Binomial name
- Apophthisis congregata Braun, 1923

Species of moth

Apophthisis congregata is a moth of the family Gracillariidae. It is known from California, United States.
