= Euprophantis autoglypta =

Scientific classification
- Kingdom: Animalia
- Phylum: Arthropoda
- Class: Insecta
- Order: Lepidoptera
- Family: Gracillariidae
- Genus: Euprophantis
- Species: E. autoglypta

Binomial name
- Euprophantis autoglypta Meyrick, 1921

Species of moth

Euprophantis autoglypta is a moth of the family Gracillariidae. It is known from India and Indonesia (Java).

== Original description ==
Wingspan 6–7 mm. Head, palpi, thorax, and abdomen shining whitish. Forewings elongate, rather narrow, costa gently arched, apex obtuse-pointed, termen very obliquely rounded; light saffron-ochreous, paler anteriorly; an undefined rather broad suffused whitish streak along dorsum from base to middle; five costal and two dorsal shining whitish streaks edged anteriorly with fuscous, first dorsal beyond middle, curved-wedgeshaped, oblique, rather broad dorsally, reaching half across wing, second praetornal, short, transverse, costal narrow, first beyond middle, oblique, hardly reaching half across wing, second less oblique, nearly reaching tornus, last three very short, beneath these two leaden dots in disc; a round black apical dot: cilia whitish, with a grey subbasal line becoming dark grey round apex and indented beneath apex, above apex a grey cloudy hook. Hindwings light grey; cilia ochreous-whitish. Java, Pekalongan (van Deventer); three specimens.
