= Oligoneurina ficicola =

Scientific classification
- Kingdom: Animalia
- Phylum: Arthropoda
- Class: Insecta
- Order: Lepidoptera
- Family: Gracillariidae
- Genus: Oligoneurina
- Species: O. ficicola

Binomial name
- Oligoneurina ficicola Vári, 1961

Species of moth

Oligoneurina ficicola is a moth of the family Gracillariidae. It is known from South Africa.

The larvae feed on Carissa and Ficus ingens. They probably mine the leaves of their host plant.
