= Spanioptila nemeseta =

Scientific classification
- Kingdom: Animalia
- Phylum: Arthropoda
- Class: Insecta
- Order: Lepidoptera
- Family: Gracillariidae
- Genus: Spanioptila
- Species: S. nemeseta

Binomial name
- Spanioptila nemeseta Meyrick, 1920

Species of moth

Spanioptila nemeseta is a moth of the family Gracillariidae. It is known from Brazil.
