= Liocrobyla kumatai =

Scientific classification
- Kingdom: Animalia
- Phylum: Arthropoda
- Class: Insecta
- Order: Lepidoptera
- Family: Gracillariidae
- Genus: Liocrobyla
- Species: L. kumatai

Binomial name
- Liocrobyla kumatai Kuroko, 1982

Species of moth

Liocrobyla kumatai is a moth of the family Gracillariidae. It is known from Japan, the Russian Far East and Korea.

The wingspan is 6–7 mm.

The larvae feed on Desmodium and Lespedeza species, including Lespedeza bicolor. They mine the leaves of their host plant.
