= Liocrobyla brachybotrys =

Scientific classification
- Kingdom: Animalia
- Phylum: Arthropoda
- Class: Insecta
- Order: Lepidoptera
- Family: Gracillariidae
- Genus: Liocrobyla
- Species: L. brachybotrys

Binomial name
- Liocrobyla brachybotrys Kuroko, 1960

Species of moth

Liocrobyla brachybotrys is a moth of the family Gracillariidae. It is known from Japan (Honshū and Kyūshū) and Korea.

The wingspan is 6–7 mm.

The larvae feed on Wisteria brachybotrys. They mine the leaves of their host plant.
