= Spanioptila eucnemis =

Scientific classification
- Kingdom: Animalia
- Phylum: Arthropoda
- Clade: Pancrustacea
- Class: Insecta
- Order: Lepidoptera
- Family: Gracillariidae
- Genus: Spanioptila
- Species: S. eucnemis

Binomial name
- Spanioptila eucnemis Walsingham, 1914

Species of moth

Spanioptila eucnemis is a moth of the family Gracillariidae. It is known from Mexico.
