= Polymitia laristana =

Scientific classification
- Kingdom: Animalia
- Phylum: Arthropoda
- Clade: Pancrustacea
- Class: Insecta
- Order: Lepidoptera
- Family: Gracillariidae
- Genus: Polymitia
- Species: P. laristana

Binomial name
- Polymitia laristana Triberti, 1986

Species of moth

Polymitia laristana is a moth of the family Gracillariidae. It is known from Iran, the type locality is southern Iran, just north of Bandar Abbas.
