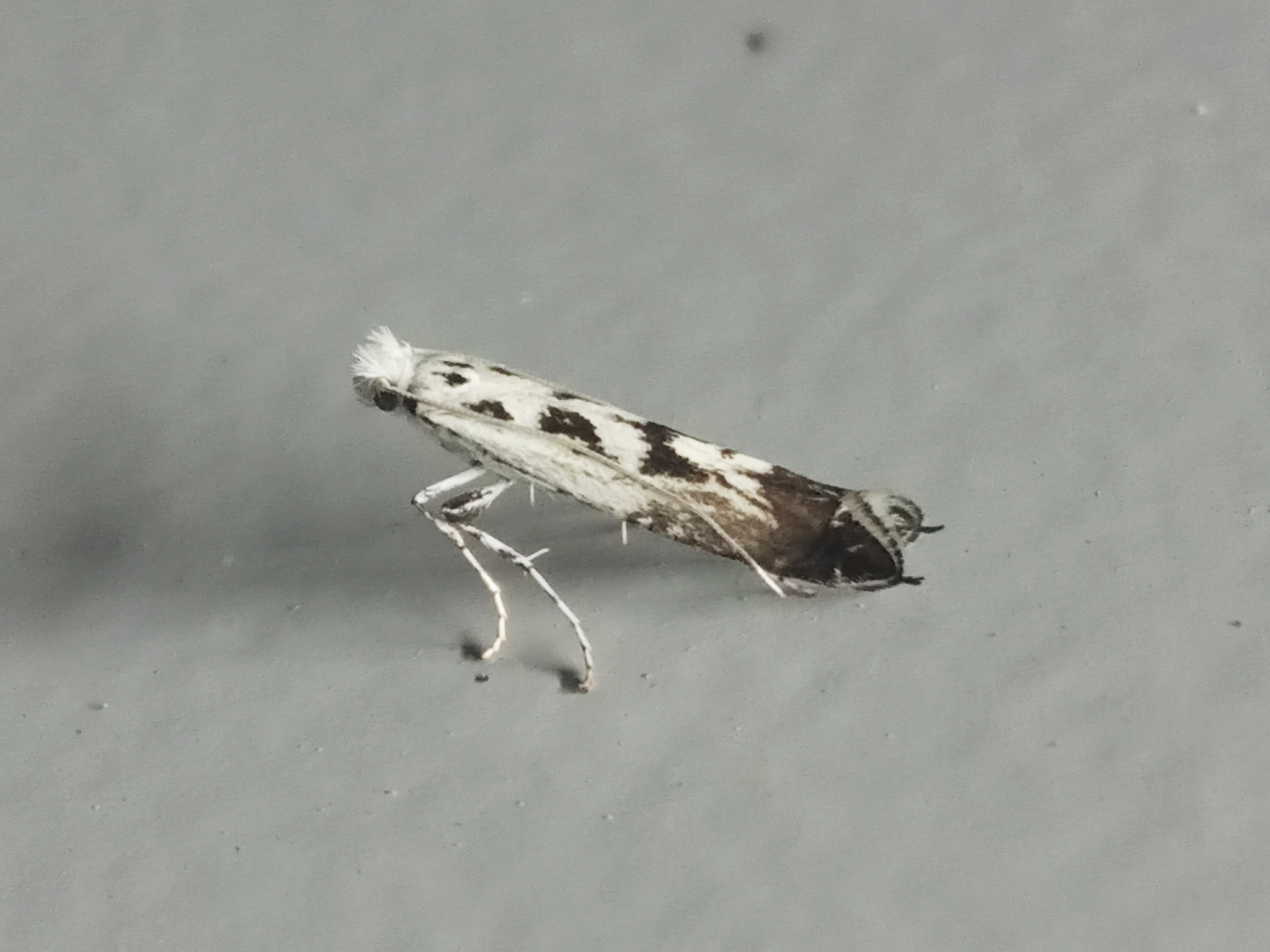

Scientific classification
- Kingdom: Animalia
- Phylum: Arthropoda
- Clade: Pancrustacea
- Class: Insecta
- Order: Lepidoptera
- Family: Gracillariidae
- Genus: Ornixola
- Species: O. caudulatella

Binomial name
- Ornixola caudulatella (Zeller, 1839)

Synonyms
- Ornix caudulatella Zeller, 1839; Ornixola eisendlei (Hauder, 1910); Ornixola nigroscriptella (Duponchel, 1843)

= Ornixola caudulatella =

Species of moth

Ornixola caudulatella is a moth of the family Gracillariidae. It is known from France, Italy, Germany, Austria, Poland, Hungary, Slovakia, the Czech Republic, Romania, Greece, Lithuania, Latvia, Estonia, Russia and Ukraine.

There are two generations per year with adults on wing from May to June and again from July to August in Hungary.

The larvae feed on Salix species, including Salix caprea and Salix acutifolia.
