= Dendrorycter =

Scientific classification
- Kingdom: Animalia
- Phylum: Arthropoda
- Class: Insecta
- Order: Lepidoptera
- Family: Gracillariidae
- Subfamily: Gracillariinae
- Genus: Dendrorycter; Kumata, 1978

Species
- See text

Genus of moths

Dendrorycter is a genus of moths in the family Gracillariidae.

== Species ==
- Dendrorycter marmaroides Kumata, 1978
