= Epicnistis euryscia =

Scientific classification
- Kingdom: Animalia
- Phylum: Arthropoda
- Class: Insecta
- Order: Lepidoptera
- Family: Gracillariidae
- Genus: Epicnistis
- Species: E. euryscia

Binomial name
- Epicnistis euryscia Meyrick, 1906

Species of moth

Epicnistis euryscia is a moth of the family Gracillariidae. It is known from Tasmania, Australia.
