= Calybites securinella =

Scientific classification
- Domain: Eukaryota
- Kingdom: Animalia
- Phylum: Arthropoda
- Class: Insecta
- Order: Lepidoptera
- Family: Gracillariidae
- Genus: Calybites
- Species: C. securinella

Binomial name
- Calybites securinella (Ermolaev, 1986)

Synonyms
- Caloptilia securinella Ermolaev, 1986

Species of moth

Calybites securinella is a moth of the family Gracillariidae. It is known from the Russian Far East. and Korea.

The larvae feed on Securinega suffruticosa. They probably mine the leaves of their host plant.
