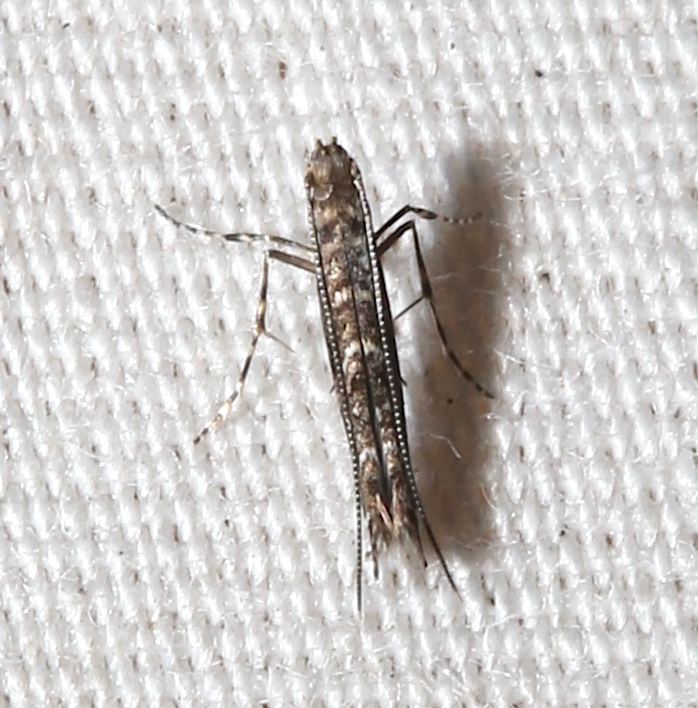

Scientific classification
- Kingdom: Animalia
- Phylum: Arthropoda
- Clade: Pancrustacea
- Class: Insecta
- Order: Lepidoptera
- Family: Gracillariidae
- Genus: Neurobathra
- Species: N. strigifinitella

Binomial name
- Neurobathra strigifinitella (Clemens, 1860)

Synonyms
- Acrocercops strigifinitella Clemens, 1860; Neurobathra duodecemlineella (Chambers, 1872); Neurobathra quercifoliella (Chambers, 1875)

= Neurobathra strigifinitella =

Species of moth

Neurobathra strigifinitella is a moth of the family Gracillariidae. It is known from Québec, Canada, and the United States (including Pennsylvania, Florida, Georgia, Maine, Maryland, Missouri, New York, Texas, Virginia, Kentucky, Vermont, and West Virginia).

The larvae feed on Castanea species (including Castanea dentata, Castanea pumila and Castanea sativa), Castanopsis, Fagus species (including Fagus grandifolia) and Quercus species (including Quercus nigra, Quercus prinoides, Quercus rubra and Quercus virginiana). They mine the leaves of their host plant. The mines may be found under the edge of a turned down leaf.
