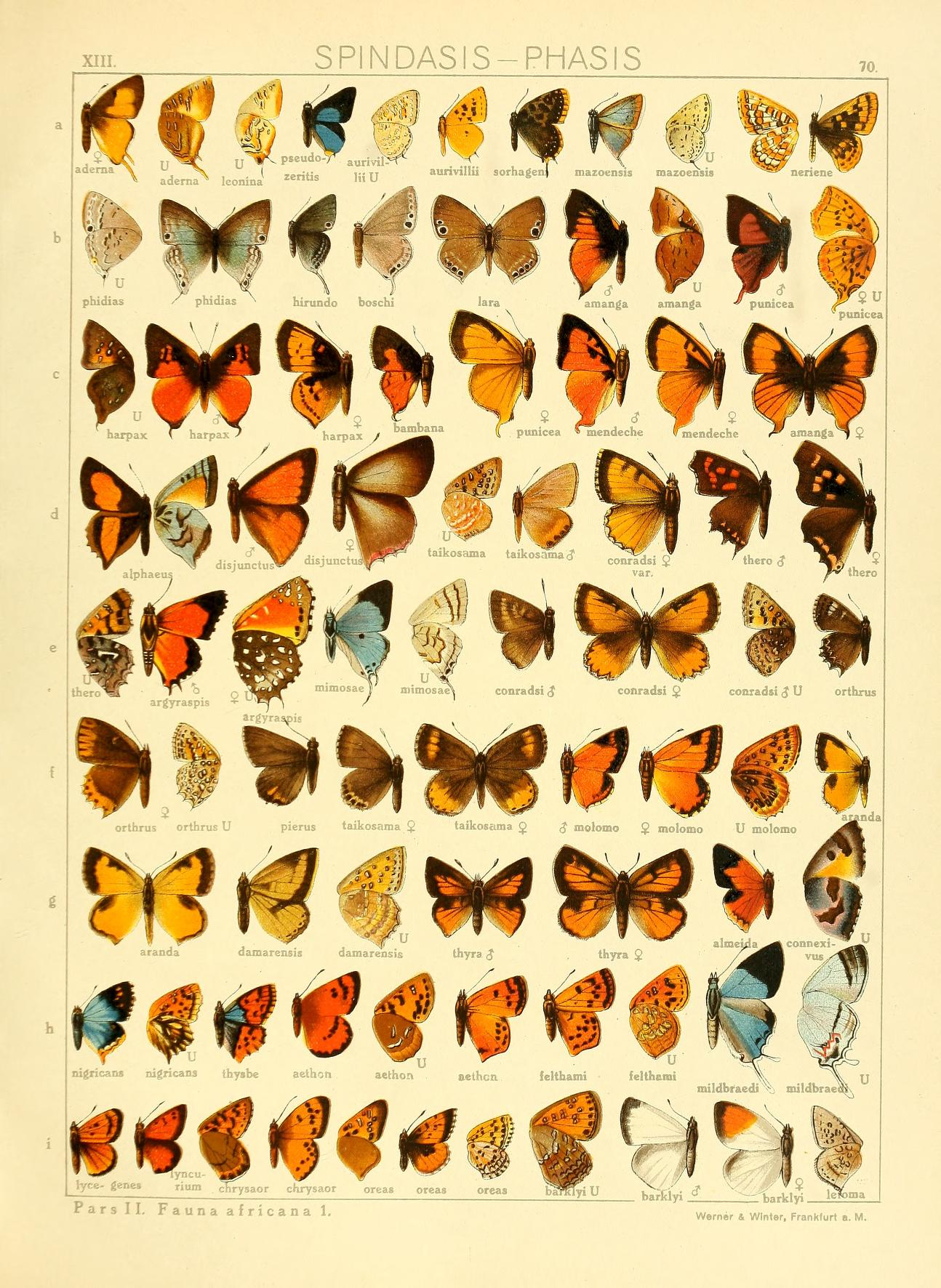

Conservation status
- Least Concern (IUCN 3.1)

Scientific classification
- Kingdom: Animalia
- Phylum: Arthropoda
- Clade: Pancrustacea
- Class: Insecta
- Order: Lepidoptera
- Family: Lycaenidae
- Genus: Chrysoritis
- Species: C. lycegenes

Binomial name
- Chrysoritis lycegenes (Trimen, 1874)

Synonyms
- Zeritis lycegenes Trimen, 1874; Poecilmitis lycegenes

= Chrysoritis lycegenes =

Mooi River opal

Species of butterfly

Chrysoritis lycegenes, the Mooi River opal, is a butterfly of the family Lycaenidae. It is found in South Africa, where it is known from northern KwaZulu-Natal to Mpumalanga, along the Drakensberg escarpment to Mariepskop in Limpopo province.

The wingspan is 21–24 mm for males and 23–26 mm for females. Adults are on wing from September to October and from December to January. There are two generations per year.

The larvae feed on Diospyros austro-africana, Diospyros lycioides, Myrsine africa, Rhus species and Chrysanthemoides monilifera. They are attended to by Crematogaster liengmei ants.

It is named after the Mooi River in KwaZulu-Natal.
