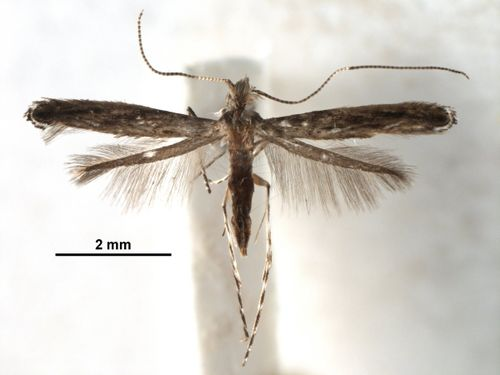

Scientific classification
- Kingdom: Animalia
- Phylum: Arthropoda
- Clade: Pancrustacea
- Class: Insecta
- Order: Lepidoptera
- Family: Gracillariidae
- Genus: Neurobathra
- Species: N. curcassi

Binomial name
- Neurobathra curcassi Busck, 1934

= Neurobathra curcassi =

Species of moth

Neurobathra curcassi is a moth of the family Gracillariidae. It is known from Cuba.

The larvae feed on Jatropha species, including Jatropha curcas. They probably mine the leaves of their host plant.
