= Eurytyla automacha =

Scientific classification
- Kingdom: Animalia
- Phylum: Arthropoda
- Class: Insecta
- Order: Lepidoptera
- Family: Gracillariidae
- Genus: Eurytyla
- Species: E. automacha

Binomial name
- Eurytyla automacha Meyrick, 1893

Species of moth

Eurytyla automacha is a moth of the family Gracillariidae. It is known from New South Wales, Australia.
