= Cupedia cupediella =

Scientific classification
- Domain: Eukaryota
- Kingdom: Animalia
- Phylum: Arthropoda
- Class: Insecta
- Order: Lepidoptera
- Family: Gracillariidae
- Genus: Cupedia
- Species: C. cupediella

Binomial name
- Cupedia cupediella (Herrich-Schäffer, 1855)

Synonyms
- Euspilapteryx cupediella Herrich-Schäffer, 1855

Species of moth

Cupedia cupediella is a moth of the family Gracillariidae. It is found from Sardinia to Bulgaria and Greece.

The larvae feed on Pistacia terebinthus. They mine the leaves of their host plant.
