= Pareclectis prionota =

Scientific classification
- Kingdom: Animalia
- Phylum: Arthropoda
- Class: Insecta
- Order: Lepidoptera
- Family: Gracillariidae
- Genus: Pareclectis
- Species: P. prionota

Binomial name
- Pareclectis prionota (Meyrick, 1928)

Synonyms
- Acrocercops prionota Meyrick, 1928

Species of moth

Pareclectis prionota is a moth of the family Gracillariidae. It is known from South Africa and Zimbabwe.
