= Pareclectis invita =

Scientific classification
- Kingdom: Animalia
- Phylum: Arthropoda
- Class: Insecta
- Order: Lepidoptera
- Family: Gracillariidae
- Genus: Pareclectis
- Species: P. invita

Binomial name
- Pareclectis invita (Meyrick, 1912)

Synonyms
- Epicephala invita Meyrick, 1912; Pareclectis ancistraula Meyrick, 1937

Species of moth

Pareclectis invita is a moth of the family Gracillariidae. It is known from South Africa.
