= Calybites lepidella =

Scientific classification
- Kingdom: Animalia
- Phylum: Arthropoda
- Class: Insecta
- Order: Lepidoptera
- Family: Gracillariidae
- Genus: Calybites
- Species: C. lepidella

Binomial name
- Calybites lepidella (Meyrick, 1880)

Synonyms
- Gracilaria lepidella Meyrick, 1880

Species of moth

Calybites lepidella is a moth of the family Gracillariidae. It is known from New South Wales, Australia.

The larvae feed on Glochidion ferdinandi. They probably mine the leaves of their host plant.
