= Penica =

Scientific classification
- Kingdom: Animalia
- Phylum: Arthropoda
- Class: Insecta
- Order: Lepidoptera
- Family: Gracillariidae
- Subfamily: Gracillariinae
- Genus: Penica; Walsingham, 1914

Species
- See text

Genus of moths

Penica is a genus of moths in the family Gracillariidae.

== Species ==
- Penica peritheta Walsingham, 1914
