= Cupedia =

Scientific classification
- Kingdom: Animalia
- Phylum: Arthropoda
- Clade: Pancrustacea
- Class: Insecta
- Order: Lepidoptera
- Family: Gracillariidae
- Subfamily: Gracillariinae
- Genus: Cupedia; Klimesch & Kumata, 1973

Species
- See text

Genus of moths

Cupedia is a genus of moths in the family Gracillariidae.

== Species ==
- Cupedia cupediella (Herrich-Schäffer, 1855)
