= Diphtheroptila ochridorsellum =

Scientific classification
- Kingdom: Animalia
- Phylum: Arthropoda
- Class: Insecta
- Order: Lepidoptera
- Family: Gracillariidae
- Genus: Diphtheroptila
- Species: D. ochridorsellum

Binomial name
- Diphtheroptila ochridorsellum (Meyrick, 1880)

Synonyms
- Coriscium ochridorsellum Meyrick, 1880; Diphtheroptila ochridorsella (Turner, 1940)

Species of moth

Diphtheroptila ochridorsellum is a moth of the family Gracillariidae. It is known from New South Wales, Australia.

The larvae feed on Glochidion ferdinandi. They probably mine the leaves of their host plant.
