= Synnympha perfrenis =

Scientific classification
- Kingdom: Animalia
- Phylum: Arthropoda
- Class: Insecta
- Order: Lepidoptera
- Family: Gracillariidae
- Genus: Synnympha
- Species: S. perfrenis

Binomial name
- Synnympha perfrenis Meyrick, 1920

Species of moth

Synnympha perfrenis is a moth of the family Gracillariidae. It is known from the Bengal region of what is now India and Bangladesh.

The larvae feed on Heritiera littoralis. They probably mine the leaves of their host plant.
