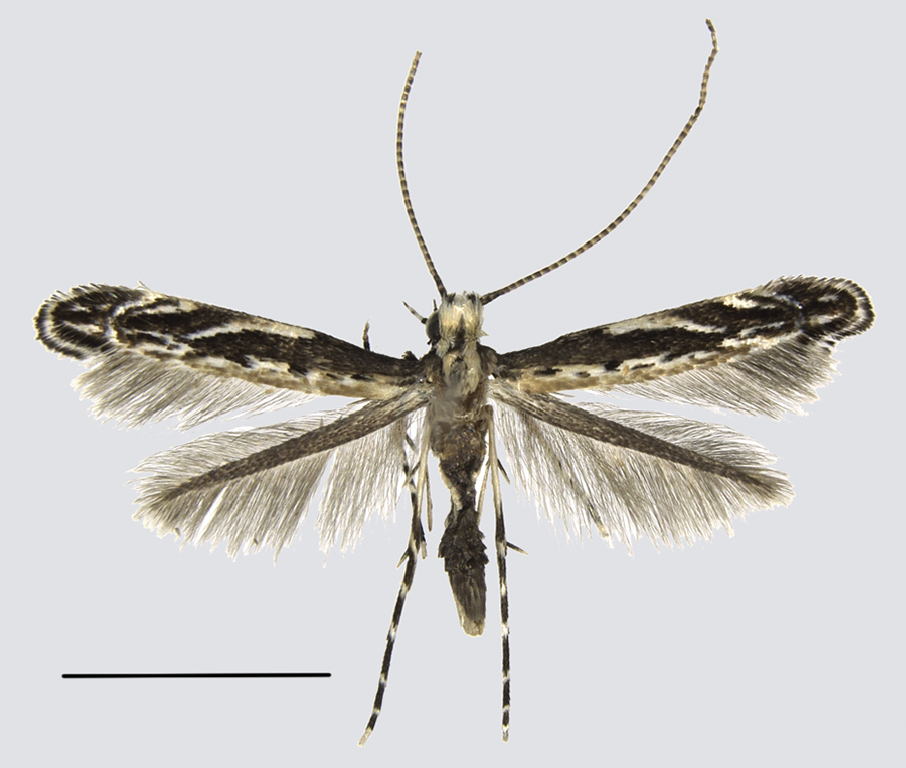

Scientific classification
- Kingdom: Animalia
- Phylum: Arthropoda
- Class: Insecta
- Order: Lepidoptera
- Family: Gracillariidae
- Genus: Liocrobyla
- Species: L. desmodiella

Binomial name
- Liocrobyla desmodiella Kuroko, 1982

= Liocrobyla desmodiella =

Species of moth

Liocrobyla desmodiella is a moth of the family Gracillariidae. It is known from Japan (all main islands), China, the Russian Far East, and Korea.

The forewing length is 3–3.5 mm (0.12–0.14 in). The larvae feed on Lespedeza bicolor, Lespedeza cyrtobotrya, Desmodium oldhamii, Ohwia caudata, and Hylodesmum podocarpum. They mine the leaves of their host plant.
