= Polymitia eximipalpella =

Scientific classification
- Kingdom: Animalia
- Phylum: Arthropoda
- Class: Insecta
- Order: Lepidoptera
- Family: Gracillariidae
- Genus: Polymitia
- Species: P. eximipalpella

Binomial name
- Polymitia eximipalpella (Gerasimov, 1930)

Synonyms
- Acrocercops eximipalpella Gerasimov, 1930; Polymitia telaviviella (Amsel, 1935)

Species of moth

Polymitia eximipalpella is a moth. It belongs to the family Gracillariidae. It is known from Cyprus, Turkey, Israel, Jordan, Afghanistan, Iran, Iraq, Saudi Arabia, Syria, Tajikistan, Turkmenistan and Uzbekistan.
