= Dysectopa scalifera =

Scientific classification
- Kingdom: Animalia
- Phylum: Arthropoda
- Class: Insecta
- Order: Lepidoptera
- Family: Gracillariidae
- Genus: Dysectopa
- Species: D. scalifera

Binomial name
- Dysectopa scalifera Vári, 1961

Species of moth

Dysectopa scalifera is a moth of the family Gracillariidae. It is known from Namibia.
