= Systoloneura geometropis =

Scientific classification
- Kingdom: Animalia
- Phylum: Arthropoda
- Class: Insecta
- Order: Lepidoptera
- Family: Gracillariidae
- Genus: Systoloneura
- Species: S. geometropis

Binomial name
- Systoloneura geometropis (Meyrick, 1936)

Synonyms
- Parectopa geometropis Meyrick, 1936

Species of moth

Systoloneura geometropis is a species of moth of the family Gracillariidae. It is known from Hong Kong, Taiwan and Japan (Honshu, Kyushu, Satunan and Shikoku).

The wingspan is 4.5–6.2 mm.

The larvae feed on Gardenia augusta, Gardenia jasminoides and Gardenia radicans.
