= Polymitia =

Scientific classification
- Kingdom: Animalia
- Phylum: Arthropoda
- Clade: Pancrustacea
- Class: Insecta
- Order: Lepidoptera
- Family: Gracillariidae
- Subfamily: Gracillariinae
- Genus: Polymitia; Triberti, 1986

Species
- See text

Genus of moths

Polymitia is a genus of moths in the family Gracillariidae.

== Species ==
- Polymitia eximipalpella (Gerasimov, 1930)
- Polymitia laristana Triberti, 1986
