= Conopomorphina ochnivora =

Scientific classification
- Kingdom: Animalia
- Phylum: Arthropoda
- Clade: Pancrustacea
- Class: Insecta
- Order: Lepidoptera
- Family: Gracillariidae
- Genus: Conopomorphina
- Species: C. ochnivora

Binomial name
- Conopomorphina ochnivora Vári, 1961

Species of moth

Conopomorphina ochnivora is a moth of the family Gracillariidae. It is known from South Africa.

The larvae feed on Ochna pulchra. They mine the leaves of their host plant.
