= Epicnistis =

Scientific classification
- Kingdom: Animalia
- Phylum: Arthropoda
- Class: Insecta
- Order: Lepidoptera
- Family: Gracillariidae
- Subfamily: Gracillariinae
- Genus: Epicnistis; Meyrick, 1906

Species
- See text

Genus of moths

Epicnistis is a genus of moths in the family Gracillariidae.

== Species ==
- Epicnistis euryscia Meyrick, 1906
