= Pogonocephala heteropsis =

Scientific classification
- Kingdom: Animalia
- Phylum: Arthropoda
- Class: Insecta
- Order: Lepidoptera
- Family: Gracillariidae
- Genus: Pogonocephala
- Species: P. heteropsis

Binomial name
- Pogonocephala heteropsis (Lower, 1894)

Synonyms
- Gracilaria heteropsis Lower, 1894

Species of moth

Pogonocephala heteropsis is a moth of the family Gracillariidae. It is known from Queensland, Australia.
