= Pleiomorpha habrogramma =

Scientific classification
- Domain: Eukaryota
- Kingdom: Animalia
- Phylum: Arthropoda
- Class: Insecta
- Order: Lepidoptera
- Family: Gracillariidae
- Genus: Pleiomorpha
- Species: P. habrogramma

Binomial name
- Pleiomorpha habrogramma Vári, 1961

Species of moth

Pleiomorpha habrogramma is a moth of the family Gracillariidae. It is known from South Africa.
