= Diphtheroptila brideliae =

Scientific classification
- Kingdom: Animalia
- Phylum: Arthropoda
- Class: Insecta
- Order: Lepidoptera
- Family: Gracillariidae
- Genus: Diphtheroptila
- Species: D. brideliae

Binomial name
- Diphtheroptila brideliae Vári, 1961

Species of moth

Diphtheroptila brideliae is a moth of the family Gracillariidae. It is known from South Africa.

The larvae feed on Bridelia micrantha. They probably mine the leaves of their host plant.
