= Liocrobyla saturata =

Scientific classification
- Domain: Eukaryota
- Kingdom: Animalia
- Phylum: Arthropoda
- Class: Insecta
- Order: Lepidoptera
- Family: Gracillariidae
- Genus: Liocrobyla
- Species: L. saturata

Binomial name
- Liocrobyla saturata Bradley, 1961

Species of moth

Liocrobyla saturata is a moth of the family Gracillariidae. It is known from Guadalcanal in the Solomon Islands.
