= Polydema hormophora =

Scientific classification
- Kingdom: Animalia
- Phylum: Arthropoda
- Clade: Pancrustacea
- Class: Insecta
- Order: Lepidoptera
- Family: Gracillariidae
- Genus: Polydema
- Species: P. hormophora

Binomial name
- Polydema hormophora (Meyrick, 1912)

Synonyms
- Acrocercops hormophora Meyrick, 1912

Species of moth

Polydema hormophora is a moth of the family Gracillariidae. It is known from South Africa.
