= Neurolipa =

Scientific classification
- Kingdom: Animalia
- Phylum: Arthropoda
- Class: Insecta
- Order: Lepidoptera
- Family: Gracillariidae
- Subfamily: Gracillariinae
- Genus: Neurolipa; Ely, 1918

Species
- See text

Genus of moths

Neurolipa is a genus of moths in the family Gracillariidae.

== Species ==
- Neurolipa randiella (Busck, 1900)
