= Pleiomorpha =

Scientific classification
- Kingdom: Animalia
- Phylum: Arthropoda
- Class: Insecta
- Order: Lepidoptera
- Family: Gracillariidae
- Subfamily: Gracillariinae
- Genus: Pleiomorpha; Vári, 1961

Species
- See text

Genus of moths

Pleiomorpha is a genus of moths in the family Gracillariidae.

== Species ==
- Pleiomorpha dystacta Vári, 1961
- Pleiomorpha eumeces Vári, 1961
- Pleiomorpha habrogramma Vári, 1961
- Pleiomorpha homotypa Vári, 1961
- Pleiomorpha symmetra Vári, 1961
