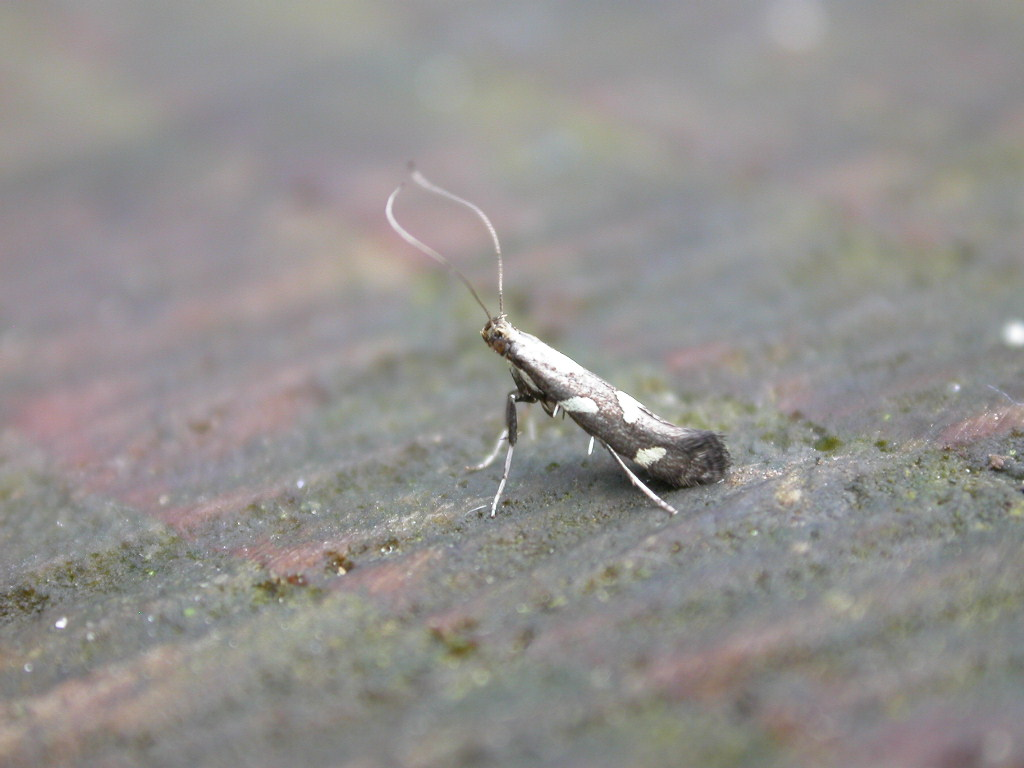
- Calybites phasianipennella

Scientific classification
- Domain: Eukaryota
- Kingdom: Animalia
- Phylum: Arthropoda
- Class: Insecta
- Order: Lepidoptera
- Family: Gracillariidae
- Subfamily: Gracillariinae
- Genus: Calybites; Hübner, 1822

Species
- See text

= Calybites =

Genus of moths

Calybites is a genus of moths in the family Gracillariidae.

== Species ==
- Calybites hauderi (Rebel, 1906)
- Calybites lepidella (Meyrick, 1880)
- Calybites phasianipennella (Hübner, [1813])
- Calybites quadrisignella (Zeller, 1839)
- Calybites securinella (Ermolaev, 1986)
- Calybites trimaculata Kumata, 1982
