= Neurobathra bohartiella =

Scientific classification
- Kingdom: Animalia
- Phylum: Arthropoda
- Class: Insecta
- Order: Lepidoptera
- Family: Gracillariidae
- Genus: Neurobathra
- Species: N. bohartiella

Binomial name
- Neurobathra bohartiella Opler, 1971

Species of moth

Neurobathra bohartiella is a moth of the family Gracillariidae. It is known from California, United States.

The larvae feed on Quercus agrifolia. They mine the leaves of their host plant.
