= Semnocera procellaris =

Scientific classification
- Kingdom: Animalia
- Phylum: Arthropoda
- Clade: Pancrustacea
- Class: Insecta
- Order: Lepidoptera
- Family: Gracillariidae
- Genus: Semnocera
- Species: S. procellaris

Binomial name
- Semnocera procellaris (Meyrick, 1914)

Synonyms
- Acrocercops procellaris Meyrick, 1914

Species of moth

Semnocera procellaris is a moth of the family Gracillariidae. It is known from South Africa.

The larvae feed on Ekebergia species. They mine the leaves of their host plant.
