= Conopomorphina gypsochroma =

Scientific classification
- Kingdom: Animalia
- Phylum: Arthropoda
- Clade: Pancrustacea
- Class: Insecta
- Order: Lepidoptera
- Family: Gracillariidae
- Genus: Conopomorphina
- Species: C. gypsochroma

Binomial name
- Conopomorphina gypsochroma Vári, 1961

Species of moth

Conopomorphina gypsochroma is a moth of the family Gracillariidae. It is known from Zimbabwe.
