= Africephala =

Scientific classification
- Kingdom: Animalia
- Phylum: Arthropoda
- Class: Insecta
- Order: Lepidoptera
- Family: Gracillariidae
- Subfamily: Gracillariinae
- Genus: Africephala; Vári, 1986
- Species: A. timaea

Binomial name
- Africephala timaea (Meyrick, 1914)

Synonyms
- Parectopa timaea Meyrick, 1914

Genus of moths

Africephala timaea is a moth of the family Gracillariidae. It is known from Malawi and Namibia.
