= Neurolipa randiella =

Scientific classification
- Domain: Eukaryota
- Kingdom: Animalia
- Phylum: Arthropoda
- Class: Insecta
- Order: Lepidoptera
- Family: Gracillariidae
- Genus: Neurolipa
- Species: N. randiella

Binomial name
- Neurolipa randiella (Busck, 1900)

Synonyms
- Coriscium randiella Busck, 1900

Species of moth

Neurolipa randiella is a moth of the family Gracillariidae which is found in Florida in the United States.

The wingspan is 5.8-6.1 mm.

The larvae feed on Randia aculeata. They mine the leaves of their host plants.
