= Euprophantis =

Scientific classification
- Kingdom: Animalia
- Phylum: Arthropoda
- Class: Insecta
- Order: Lepidoptera
- Family: Gracillariidae
- Subfamily: Gracillariinae
- Genus: Euprophantis; Meyrick, 1921

Species
- See text

Genus of moths

Euprophantis is a genus of moths in the family Gracillariidae.

== Species ==
- Euprophantis autoglypta Meyrick, 1921
