= Dendrorycter marmaroides =

Scientific classification
- Kingdom: Animalia
- Phylum: Arthropoda
- Clade: Pancrustacea
- Class: Insecta
- Order: Lepidoptera
- Family: Gracillariidae
- Genus: Dendrorycter
- Species: D. marmaroides

Binomial name
- Dendrorycter marmaroides Kumata, 1978

Species of moth

Dendrorycter marmaroides is a moth of the family Gracillariidae. It is primarily found in Hokkaidō island of Japan.

The wingspan is 7-8.8 mm.

The larvae feed on Alnus hirsuta and Alnus japonica.
