= Pareclectis mimetis =

Scientific classification
- Kingdom: Animalia
- Phylum: Arthropoda
- Class: Insecta
- Order: Lepidoptera
- Family: Gracillariidae
- Genus: Pareclectis
- Species: P. mimetis

Binomial name
- Pareclectis mimetis Vári, 1961

Species of moth

Pareclectis mimetis is a moth of the family Gracillariidae. It is known from Mozambique.
