= Conopomorphina =

Scientific classification
- Kingdom: Animalia
- Phylum: Arthropoda
- Clade: Pancrustacea
- Class: Insecta
- Order: Lepidoptera
- Family: Gracillariidae
- Subfamily: Ornixolinae
- Genus: Conopomorphina; Vári, 1961

Species
- 3 species (see text)

Genus of moths

Conopomorphina is a genus of moths in the family Gracillariidae. They occur in Sub-Saharan Africa.

== Species ==
There are three recognized species:

- Conopomorphina aptata (Meyrick, 1914)
- Conopomorphina gypsochroma Vári, 1961
- Conopomorphina ochnivora Vári, 1961
