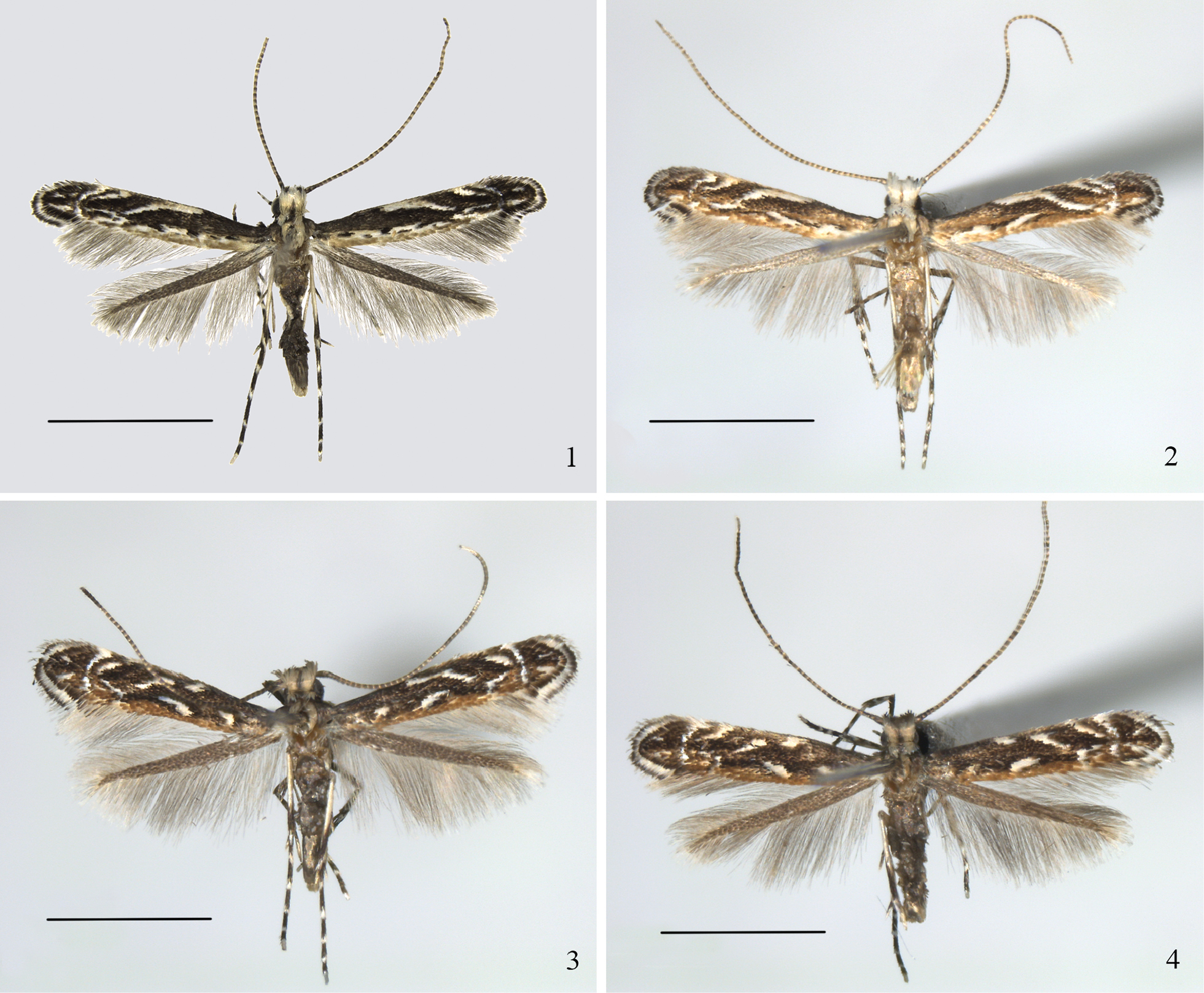
- Liocrobyla desmodiella, Liocrobyla lobata, and Liocrobyla indigofera

Scientific classification
- Kingdom: Animalia
- Phylum: Arthropoda
- Class: Insecta
- Order: Lepidoptera
- Family: Gracillariidae
- Subfamily: Gracillariinae
- Genus: Liocrobyla; Meyrick, 1916

Species
- See text

= Liocrobyla =

Genus of moths

Liocrobyla is a genus of moths in the family Gracillariidae.

== Species ==
- Liocrobyla brachybotrys Kuroko, 1960
- Liocrobyla desmodiella Kuroko, 1982
- Liocrobyla kumatai Kuroko, 1982
- Liocrobyla lobata Kuroko, 1960
- Liocrobyla minima (Noreika, 1992)
- Liocrobyla paraschista Meyrick, 1916
- Liocrobyla saturata Bradley, 1961
- Liocrobyla tephrosiae Vári, 1961
