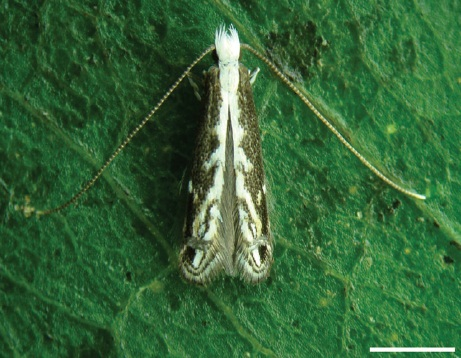

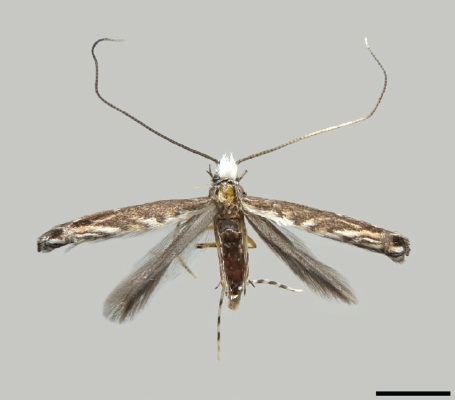

Scientific classification
- Domain: Eukaryota
- Kingdom: Animalia
- Phylum: Arthropoda
- Class: Insecta
- Order: Lepidoptera
- Family: Gracillariidae
- Subfamily: Gracillariinae
- Genus: Spinivalva; Moreira & Vargas, 2013
- Species: S. gaucha

Binomial name
- Spinivalva gaucha Moreira & Vargas, 2013

= Spinivalva =

Genus of moths

Spinivalva is a genus of moths in the family Gracillariidae. It contains only one species, Spinivalva gaucha, which is found in Brazil.

The length of the forewings is 2.78–3.61 mm. The forewings are mostly covered by dark-grey scales. There is a narrow stripe of white scales along the posterior margin. A zigzag edge, formed by short, oblique white fascia, separates this stripe from the remaining, mostly dark-grey area. The hindwings are completely covered by dark-grey scales.

The larvae feed on Passiflora actinia, Passiflora misera and Passiflora suberosa. They mine the leaves of their host plant. The mine starts as a narrow, slightly serpentine gallery, increasing in width progressively and becoming a blotch during the last larval instar. The larva feeds on the palisade parenchyma. Dark-green granular frass pellets are deposited throughout the mine. The larva leaves the mine through a slit made in the blotch section. Pupation takes place in a cocoon, usually made on the adaxial leaf surface of adjacent leaves.

== Etymology ==
The genus name is derived from Latin spina (meaning spine) and valve (meaning valve) and refers to the conspicuous spine-like process present on the male valvae. The specific name is derived from the Portuguese Gaúcho, a term commonly used for natives of Rio Grande do Sul, the state in Brazil where the new species was first found.

== Gallery ==
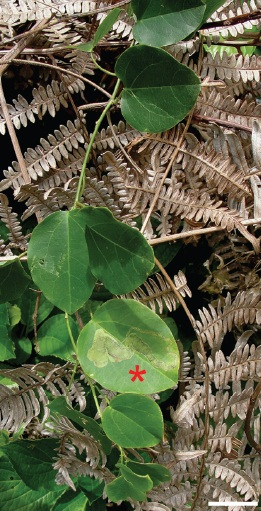
Passiflora actnia shoot at the type locality, mined leaf marked with an asterisk

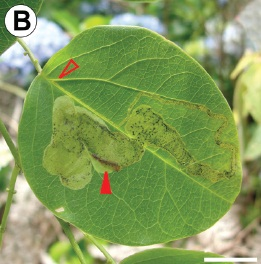
Mine on upper leaf surface

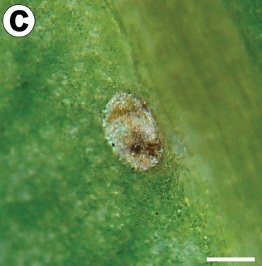
Chorion of empty egg on lower surface

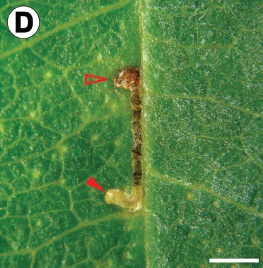
First-instar larva (indicated by closed arrow) visible through transparent serpentine section of a young mine (open arrow indicates the beginning of the mine on the upper leaf surface)

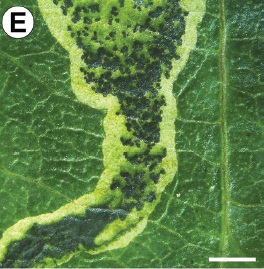
Initial portion of blotch section in detail, showing frass and damage to leaf parenchyma left by last-instar larva within the mine

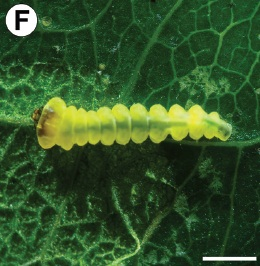
Fourth-instar larva in the mine

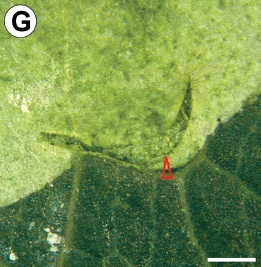
Exit hole (arrow) used by a last-instar larva to leave the mine

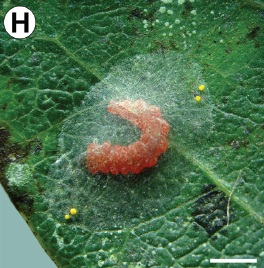
Last-instar larva after changing color, building the cocoon outside the mine on the leaf surface

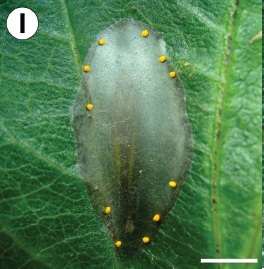
Cocoon, with pupa visible through transparency

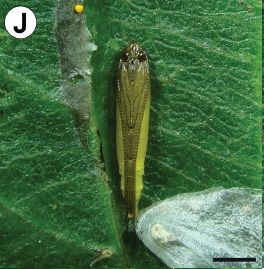
Pupa in detail, after removing the cocoon

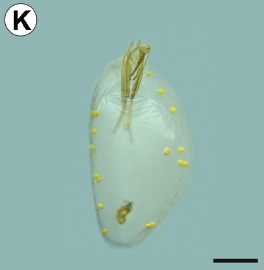
Pupal exuvia protruding from the cocoon exit hole onto plastic substrate, just after the adult emergence
