= Polydema =

Scientific classification
- Kingdom: Animalia
- Phylum: Arthropoda
- Class: Insecta
- Order: Lepidoptera
- Family: Gracillariidae
- Subfamily: Ornixolinae
- Genus: Polydema; Vári, 1961

Species
- See text

Genus of moths

Polydema is a genus of moths in the family Gracillariidae.

== Species ==
- Polydema hormophora (Meyrick, 1912)
- Polydema vansoni Vári, 1961
