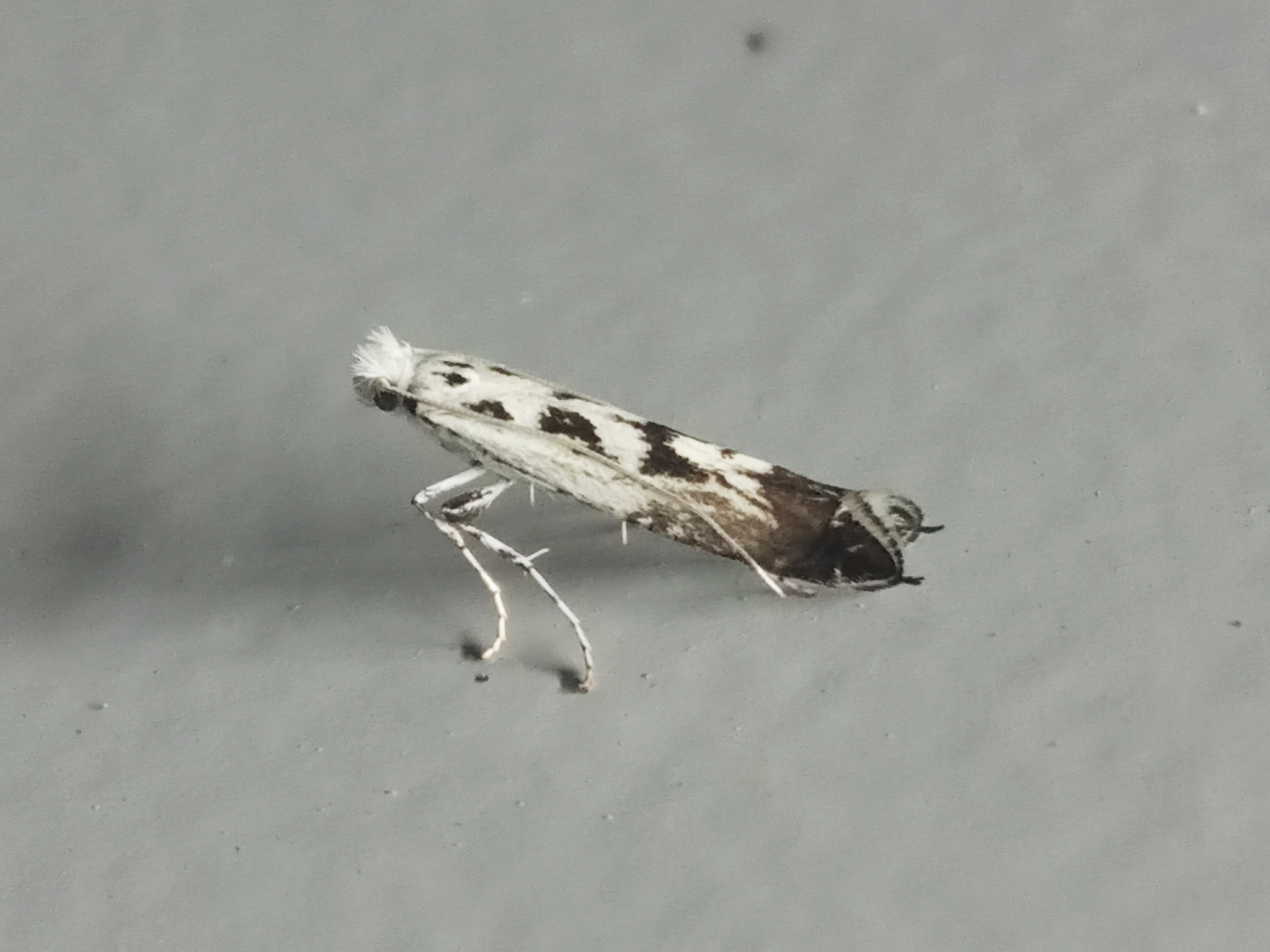
- Ornixola caudulatella

Scientific classification
- Kingdom: Animalia
- Phylum: Arthropoda
- Class: Insecta
- Order: Lepidoptera
- Family: Gracillariidae
- Subfamily: Gracillariinae
- Genus: Ornixola; Kuznetzov, 1979

Species
- See text

= Ornixola =

Genus of moths

Ornixola is a genus of moths in the family Gracillariidae.

== Species ==
- Ornixola caudulatella (Zeller, 1839)
