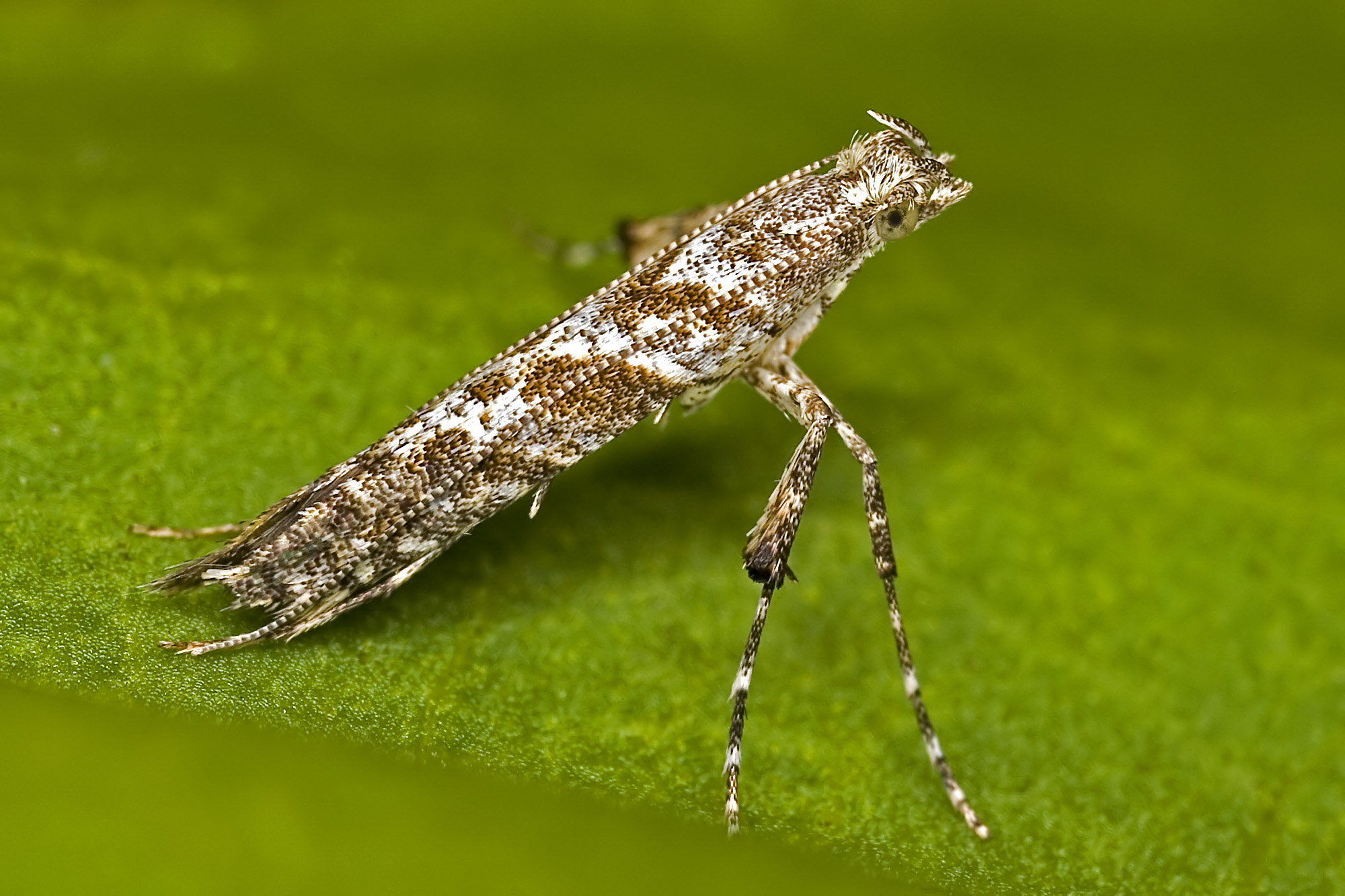

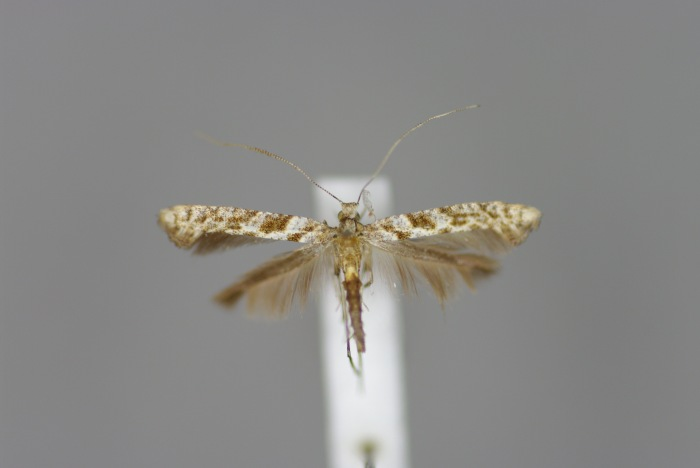

Scientific classification
- Kingdom: Animalia
- Phylum: Arthropoda
- Clade: Pancrustacea
- Class: Insecta
- Order: Lepidoptera
- Family: Gracillariidae
- Genus: Caloptilia
- Species: C. cuculipennella

Binomial name
- Caloptilia cuculipennella (Hübner, 1796)

Synonyms
- Tinea cuculipennella Hübner, 1796

= Caloptilia cuculipennella =

Feathered slender

Species of moth

Caloptilia cuculipennella (commonly known as the feathered slender) is a moth of the family Gracillariidae. It is found in Holarctic Region, including most of Europe.

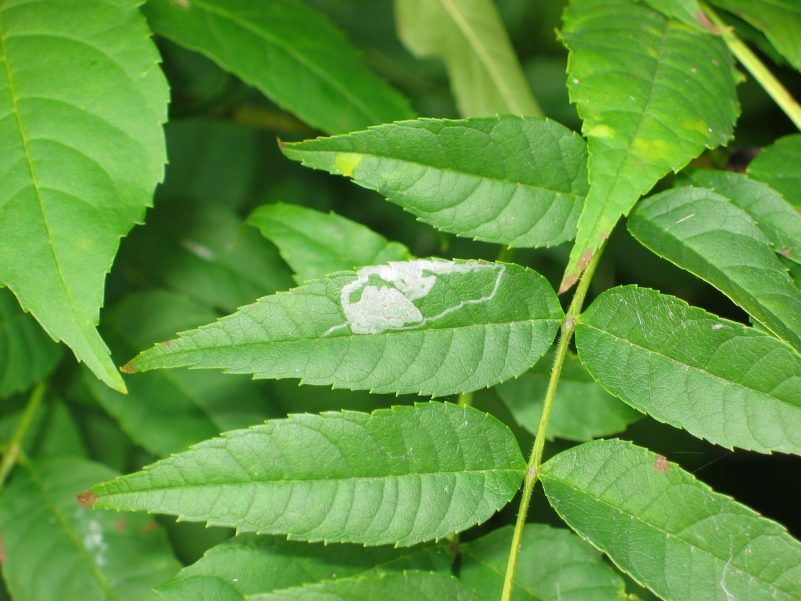
Damage

The wingspan is 11–12 millimetres (0.43–0.47 in).The posterior tibiae are smooth above. Forewings are whitish, with numerous ochreous or brown strigulae finely irrorated with black; an oblique fascia near base hardly reaching costa, a second before middle hardly reaching dorsum, a third beyond middle interrupted in disc, and a costal spot at 3/4 ochreous or brownish, finely irrorated with black. Hindwings are dark grey. The larva is green -whitish; head and plate of 2 brown.

The moth flies from July to September.The larvae feed on Fraxinus excelsior, Ligustrum vulgare and Syringa vulgaris.
