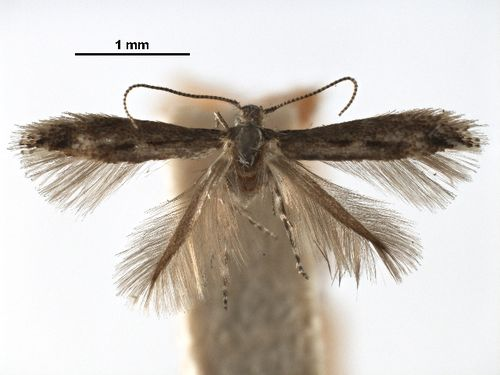

Scientific classification
- Kingdom: Animalia
- Phylum: Arthropoda
- Clade: Pancrustacea
- Class: Insecta
- Order: Lepidoptera
- Family: Gracillariidae
- Subfamily: Ornixolinae
- Genus: Apophthisis; Braun, 1915

Species
- See text

= Apophthisis =

Genus of moths

Apophthisis is a genus of moths in the family Gracillariidae.

== Species ==
- Apophthisis congregata Braun, 1923
- Apophthisis pullata Braun, 1915
