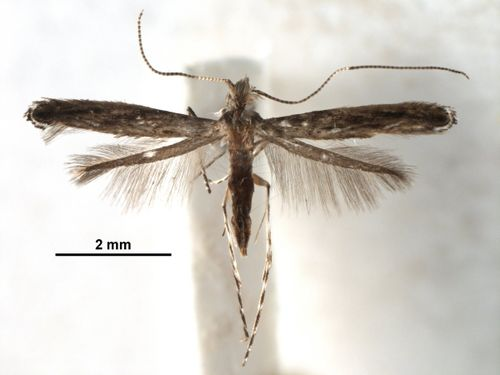

Scientific classification
- Kingdom: Animalia
- Phylum: Arthropoda
- Clade: Pancrustacea
- Class: Insecta
- Order: Lepidoptera
- Family: Gracillariidae
- Subfamily: Gracillariinae
- Genus: Neurobathra; Ely, 1918

Species
- See text

= Neurobathra =

Genus of moths

Neurobathra is a genus of moths in the family Gracillariidae.

== Species ==
- Neurobathra bohartiella Opler, 1971
- Neurobathra curcassi Busck, 1934
- Neurobathra strigifinitella (Clemens, 1860)
