= Pogonocephala =

Scientific classification
- Kingdom: Animalia
- Phylum: Arthropoda
- Class: Insecta
- Order: Lepidoptera
- Family: Gracillariidae
- Subfamily: Ornixolinae
- Genus: Pogonocephala; Vári, 1961

Species
- See text

Genus of moths

Pogonocephala is a genus of moths in the family Gracillariidae.

== Species ==
- Pogonocephala heteropsis (Lower, 1894)
- Pogonocephala veneranda (Meyrick, 1909)
