= Spanioptila =

Scientific classification
- Kingdom: Animalia
- Phylum: Arthropoda
- Class: Insecta
- Order: Lepidoptera
- Family: Gracillariidae
- Subfamily: Ornixolinae
- Genus: Spanioptila; Walsingham, 1897

Species
- See text

Genus of moths

Spanioptila is a genus of moths in the family Gracillariidae.

== Species ==
- Spanioptila codicaria Meyrick, 1920
- Spanioptila eucnemis Walsingham, 1914
- Spanioptila nemeseta Meyrick, 1920
- Spanioptila spinosum Walsingham, 1897
