= Leurocephala =

Scientific classification
- Kingdom: Animalia
- Phylum: Arthropoda
- Clade: Pancrustacea
- Class: Insecta
- Order: Lepidoptera
- Family: Gracillariidae
- Subfamily: Gracillariinae
- Genus: Leurocephala; Davis & McKay, 2011
- Species: L. schinusae

Binomial name
- Leurocephala schinusae Davis & McKay, 2011

Genus of moths

Leurocephala is a genus of moths in the family Gracillariidae. It contains only one species, Leurocephala schinusae, which is found in Argentina.

The larvae feed on Schinus terebinthifolus. They mine the leaves of their host plant.
