= Diphtheroptila =

Scientific classification
- Kingdom: Animalia
- Phylum: Arthropoda
- Class: Insecta
- Order: Lepidoptera
- Family: Gracillariidae
- Subfamily: Gracillariinae
- Genus: Diphtheroptila; Vári, 1961

Species
- See text

Genus of moths

Diphtheroptila is a genus of moths in the family Gracillariidae.

== Species ==
- Diphtheroptila brideliae Vári, 1961
- Diphtheroptila ochridorsellum (Meyrick, 1880)
- Diphtheroptila oxyloga (Meyrick, 1928)
