= Pareclectis =

Scientific classification
- Kingdom: Animalia
- Phylum: Arthropoda
- Class: Insecta
- Order: Lepidoptera
- Family: Gracillariidae
- Subfamily: Ornixolinae
- Genus: Pareclectis; Meyrick, 1937

Species
- See text

Genus of moths

Pareclectis is a genus of moths in the family Gracillariidae.

== Species ==
- Pareclectis adelospila Vári, 1961
- Pareclectis hobohmi Vári, 1961
- Pareclectis invita (Meyrick, 1912)
- Pareclectis leucosticha Vári, 1961
- Pareclectis mimetis Vári, 1961
- Pareclectis prionota (Meyrick, 1928)
