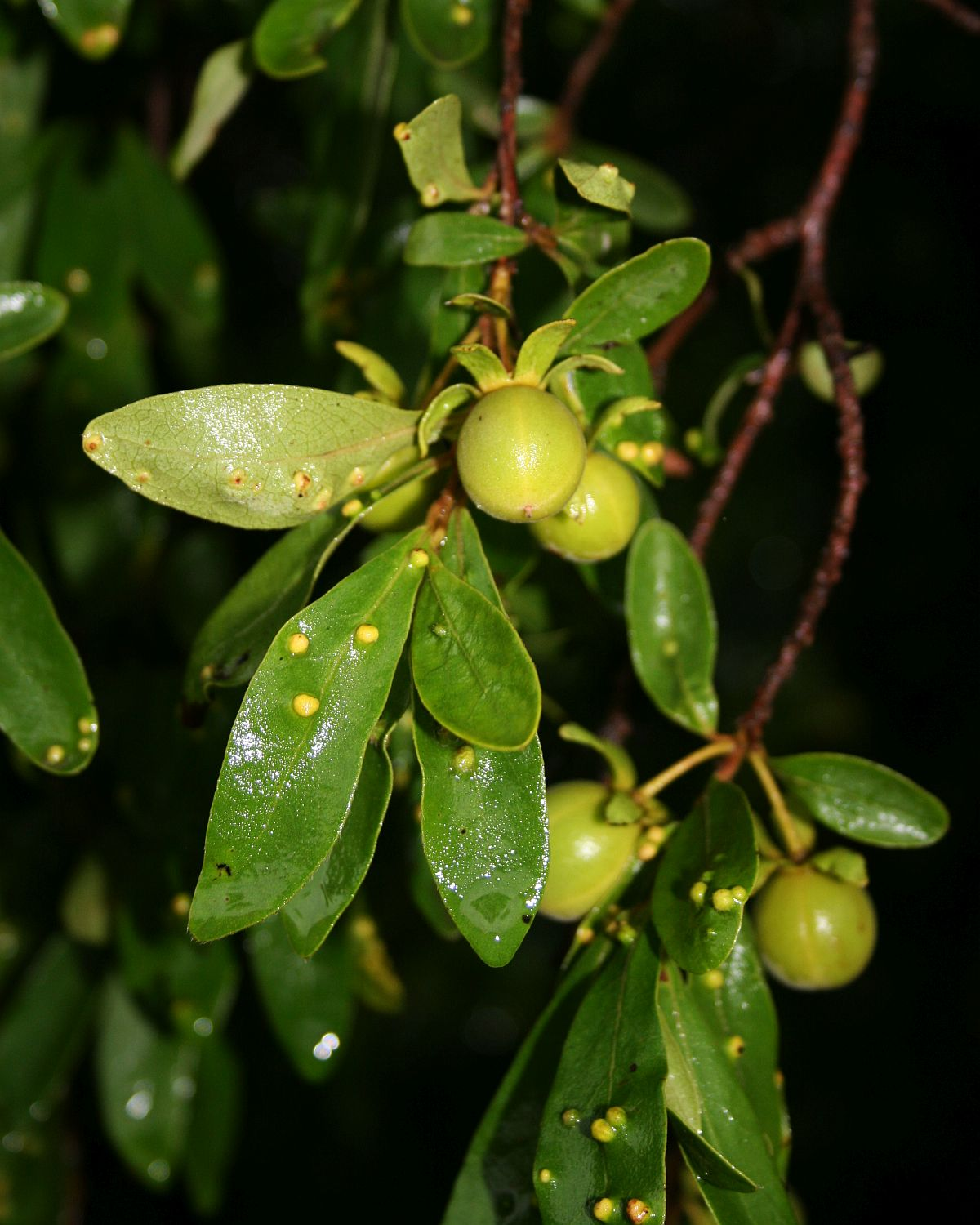
- Diospyros lycioides subsp. lycioides in South Africa

Conservation status
- Least Concern (IUCN 3.1)

Scientific classification
- Kingdom: Plantae
- Clade: Tracheophytes
- Clade: Angiosperms
- Clade: Eudicots
- Clade: Asterids
- Order: Ericales
- Family: Ebenaceae
- Genus: Diospyros
- Species: D. lycioides

Binomial name
- Diospyros lycioides Desf.

= Diospyros lycioides =

Species of African shrub

Diospyros lycioides, commonly called the bushveld bluebush, is a species of African Diospyros, trees and shrubs in the family Ebenaceae. It is native to central and southern Africa, except the winter-rainfall area. It grows in Australia and is known as a weed there. Many parts of the plant are used: the wood, the roots and stems for toothbrushes, the fruits for alcoholic drinks, and the roots and bark in traditional medicine.

It can form thickets, and it usually grows up to three meters high, though at its tallest it can be eight meters. It is one of twenty species of Diospyros in South Africa.

It has 3-4 subspecies, including D. l. subsp. lycioides, D. l. subsp. guerkei, D. l. subsp. nitens, and D. l. subsp. sericea.

== Uses ==
Its root and stem are used as toothbrushes, and its wood is used for spoons, toys, construction, and furniture. In South Africa, its fruits are used to make beer and other alcoholic drinks, and its seeds are used as a coffee substitute. It also has many medicinal uses, including treating cold and coughs by chewing the roots, and using the powdered bark of the root as an abortifacient. Its leaves are food for the Mooi River opal butterfly (Chrysoritis lycegenes) and its flowers are attractive to many animals, namely bees and a few African birds.
