= List of moths of Chile (Saturniidae) =

This is a list of the moths of family Saturniidae which are found in Chile. It also acts as an index to the species articles and forms part of the full List of moths of Chile. Subfamilies are listed alphabetically.

== Subfamily Cercophaninae ==
- Cercophana frauenfeldi Felder, 1862
- Cercophana venusta (Walker, 1856)
- Microdulia mirabilis (Rotschild, 1895)
- Neocercophana philippi Izquierdo, 1895

== Subfamily Hemileucinae ==
=== Tribe Hemileucini ===
- Adetomeris erythrops (Blanchard, 1852)
- Adetomeris microphthalma (Izquierdo, 1895)
- Cinommata bistrigata Butler, 1882
- Ormiscodes amphinome (Fabricius, 1775)
- Ormiscodes cognata Philippi, 1860
- Ormiscodes nigrosignata Philippi, 1860
- Ormiscodes penai Lemaire & Parra, 1995
- Ormiscodes rufosignata (Blanchard, 1852)
- Ormiscodes socialis socialis (Feisthamel, 1839)
- Ormiscodes socialis grisea Ureta, 1957
- Ormiscodes joiceyi (Draudt, 1930)

=== Tribe Polythysanini ===
- Polythysana cinerascens Phillipi, 1860
- Polythysana rubrescens Blanchard, 1852
