= List of moths of Chile (Gracillariidae) =

This is a list of the moths of family Gracillariidae which are found in Chile. It also acts as an index to the species articles and forms part of the full List of moths of Chile. Subfamilies are listed alphabetically.

== Subfamily Gracillariinae ==
- Acrocercops serrigera Meyrick, 1915
- Adenogasteria leguminivora Davis & Vargas, 2020
- Atacamaptilia ambrosiavora Vargas & Espinoza-Donoso, 2022
- Caloptilia guacanivora Vargas-Ortiz & Vargas, 2018
- Chileoptilia yaroella Vargas & Landry, 2005
- Cremastobombycia socoromaensis Vargas, 2024
- Parectopa rotigera Meyrick, 1931
- Vihualpenia lithraeophaga Mundaca, Parra & Vargas, 2013

== Subfamily Phyllocnistinae ==
- Angelabella tecomae Vargas & Parra, 2005
- Phyllocnistis puyehuensis Davis, 1994
- Prophyllocnistis epidrimys Davis, 1994
