= Ptochus limbatus =

Scientific classification
- Kingdom: Animalia
- Phylum: Arthropoda
- Class: Insecta
- Order: Coleoptera
- Suborder: Polyphaga
- Infraorder: Cucujiformia
- Family: Curculionidae
- Genus: Ptochus
- Species: P. limbatus

Binomial name
- Ptochus limbatus Marshall, 1916

Species of beetle

Ptochus limbatus is a species of weevil found in India, Sri Lanka and Pakistan.

== Description ==
This species has a body length is about 7.5 to 8 mm. Body reddish brown in color, where the dorsum covered with dense brown scales. Ventrum with uniform pale green or greenish-grey scales. There is a well-defined lateral stripe on the head and thorax. Head finely striolate beneath the scales. Eyes are large, sub-lateral and convex. Rostrum broad, which gradually narrowed from the base. Antennae ferruginous. Protthorax broad with slightly rounded sides. Scutellum distinct, and clothed with green scales. Elytra narrowly elliptical in male and considerably wider in female.

Adults were collected from Juglans regia.
