= Cercophana =

Scientific classification
- Kingdom: Animalia
- Phylum: Arthropoda
- Class: Insecta
- Order: Lepidoptera
- Family: Saturniidae
- Subfamily: Cercophaninae
- Genus: Cercophana; C. Felder, 1862

Genus of moths

Cercophana is a genus of moths in the family Saturniidae first described by Cajetan Felder in 1862.

== Species ==
- Cercophana frauenfeldi Felder, 1862
- Cercophana venusta (Walker, 1856)
