= Neocercophana =

Scientific classification
- Kingdom: Animalia
- Phylum: Arthropoda
- Class: Insecta
- Order: Lepidoptera
- Family: Saturniidae
- Subfamily: Cercophaninae
- Genus: Neocercophana; Izquierdo, 1895
- Species: N. philippii

Binomial name
- Neocercophana philippii Izquierdo, 1895

Genus of moths

Neocercophana is a monotypic moth genus in the family Saturniidae described by Izquierdo in 1895. Its only species, Neocercophana philippii, was described by the same author in the same year. The type specimen was described from Chile.
