= Juglans regia 'Zijing' =

Walnut cultivar

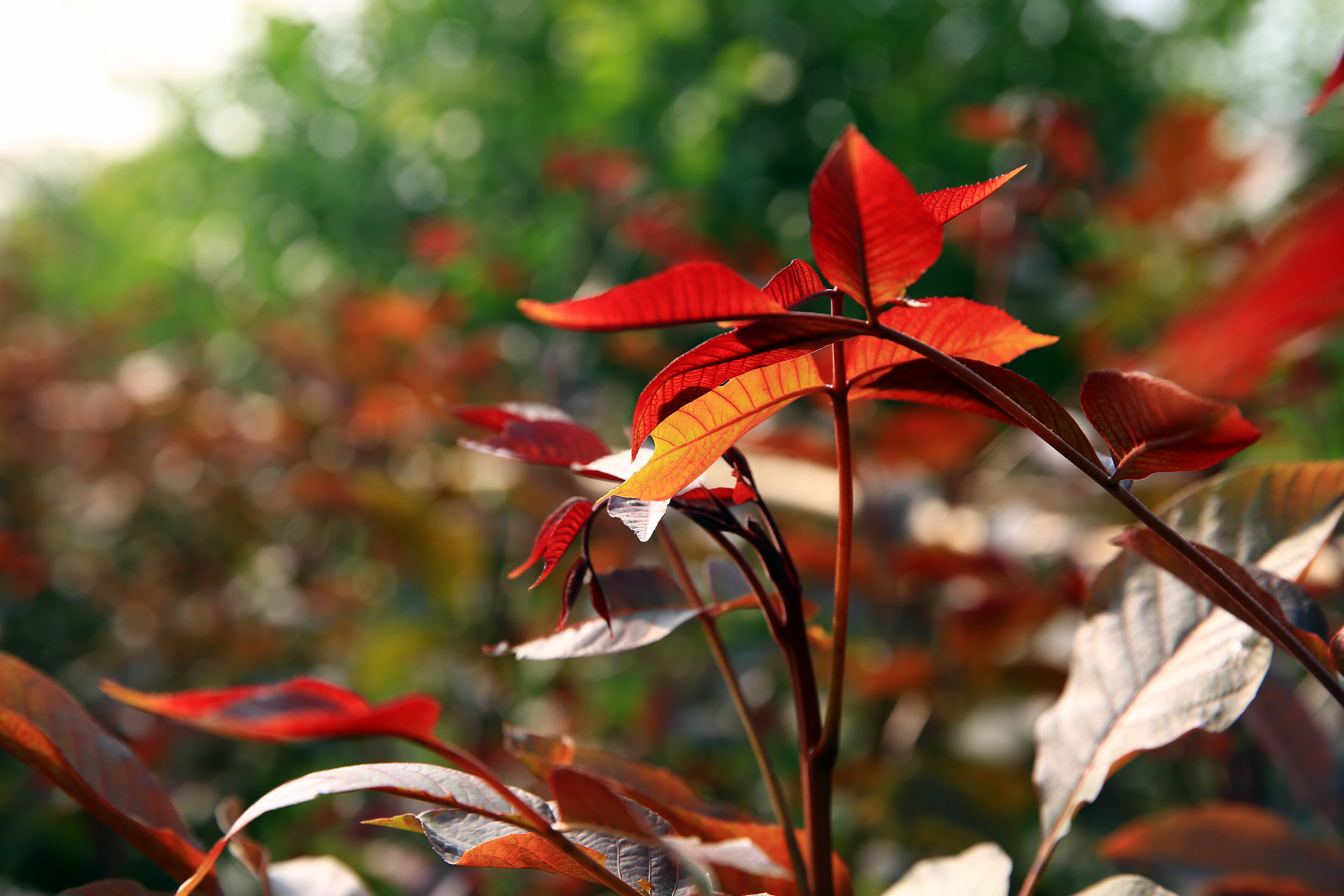
- Genus: Juglans
- Species: Juglans regia
- Cultivar: 'Zijing'

Juglans regia 'Zijing' (Chinese: 紫京彩叶核桃树,紫京核桃树) is a cultivar of walnut developed in Beijing, China. It was developed from mother trees of purple-leaved walnut, which was found in the mountains of Qingshui, Mentougou District, China in 1998.

J. regia Zijing was cultivated and named by Wang Xiupo. On 17 October 2017, he obtained the certificate of plant variety rights from the State Forestry Administration of China. J. regia Zijing trees have four major purple features, which are female flowers, leaves, peel, and kernels. This is why they are also called Wuzi walnuts (五紫核桃). The trees are mainly distributed in Beijing International Walnut Manor.

J. regia Zijing is used mostly in landscape architecture, military and furniture items, and road greening protection.

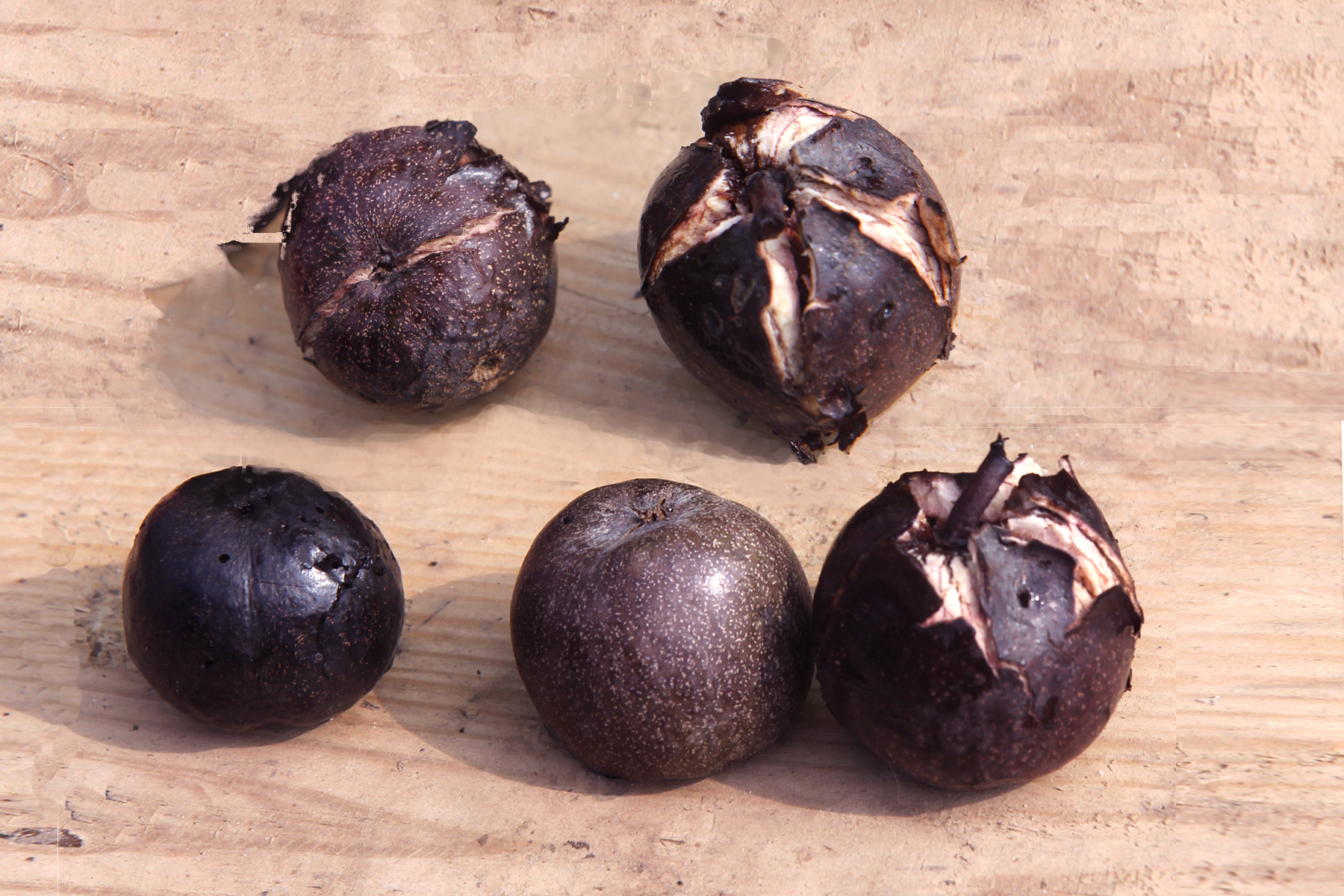
The fruits of J. regia Zijing

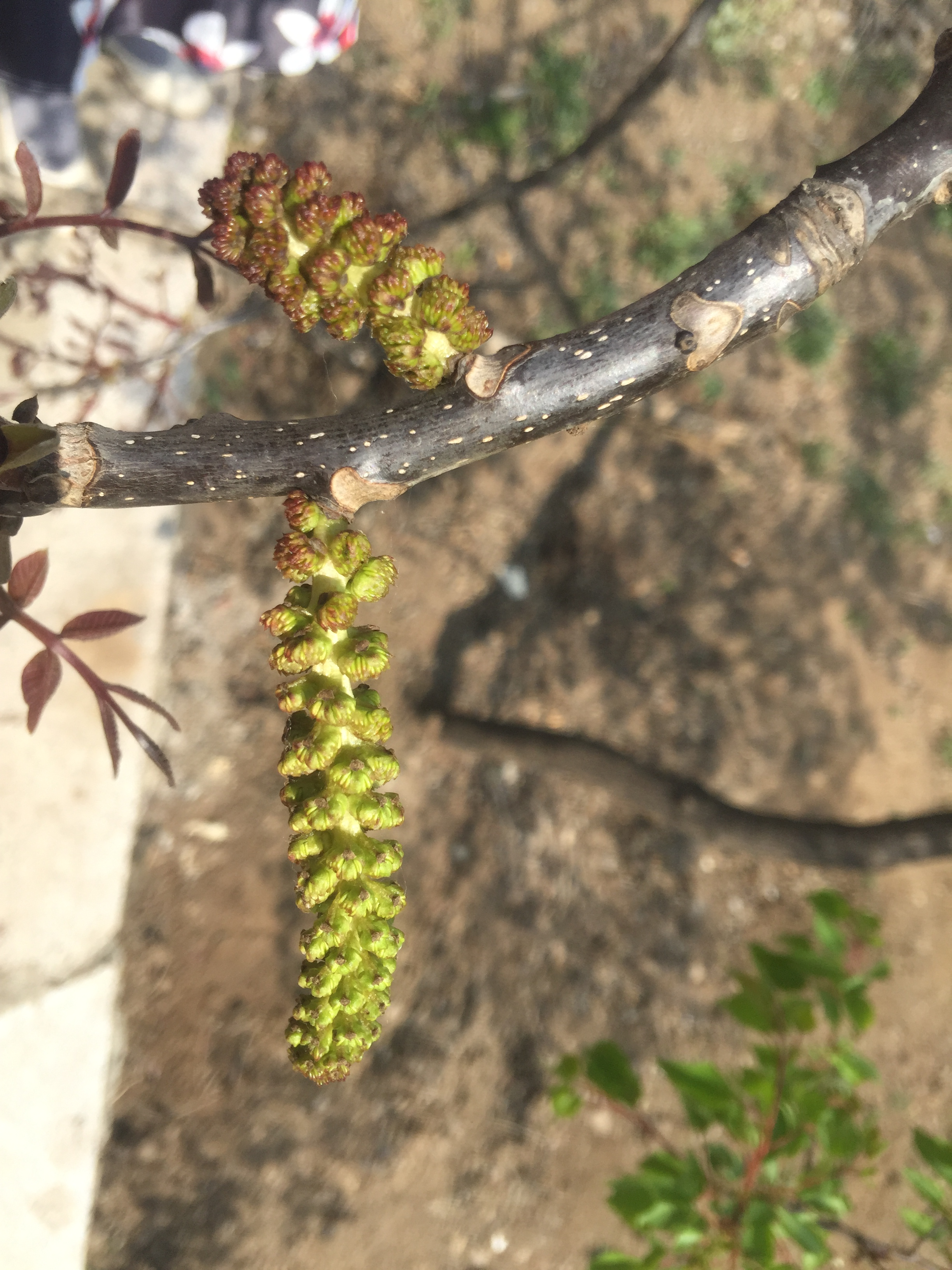
Flowers of the J. regia zijing tree

== Habitat ==
J. regia Zijing trees grow at an altitude of about 800 meters. They have strong resistance and are adapted to temperate climate regions. Because they are light-preferring plants, they are often cultivated on south-facing slopes in the Northern Hemisphere.

== Cultivation ==
J. regia Zijing is cultivated in late March. Pest-free developing branches and annual branches are collected to serve as scions. The survival rate of a one- to two-year old seedling is higher than that of a regular walnut. After planting, it is irrigated with water and fertilised.

Grafting is done from the end of May to the beginning of July. Weeding is performed frequently, and drainage is done especially during the rainy season.

Its flowers start blooming in May, and its fruits start coming out in September.

Bacterial nuclear root rot, caused by Sclerotinia sclerotiorum, results in seedling root and lateral root cortex decay. Prevention and treatment involve selecting nursery lands, managing soil water content, disinfecting seeds and soil quality. This is usually done from June to July.
