= List of moths of Chile =

This page provides links to detailed lists of moth species that have been recorded in Chile. The lists are sorted by family.

- List of moths of Chile (Gracillariidae)
- List of moths of Chile (Tortricidae)
- List of moths of Chile (Cossidae)
- List of moths of Chile (Lasiocampidae)
- List of moths of Chile (Saturniidae)
- List of moths of Chile (Noctuidae)

== See also ==
- List of butterflies of Chile
- Wildlife of Chile
