= List of moths of Chile (Lasiocampidae) =

This is a list of the moths of family Lasiocampidae which are found in Chile. It also acts as an index to the species articles and forms part of the full List of moths of Chile.

- Euglyphis lignosa (Walker, 1855)
- Macromphalia affinis (Feisthamel, 1839)
- Macromphalia ancilla (Philippi, 1859)
- Macromphalia dedecora (Feisthamel, 1839)
- Macromphalia felispardalis Ureta, 1957
- Macromphalia hypoleuca (Philippi, 1859)
- Macromphalia nigrofasciata Ureta, 1957
- Macromphalia nitida Butler, 1882
- Macromphalia oehrensi Ureta, 1957
- Macromphalia purissima Butler, 1882
- Macromphalia rivularis Butler, 1882
- Macromphalia rubiginea rubiginea Ureta, 1957
- Macromphalia rubiginea rufa Ureta, 1957
- Macromphalia spadix Draudt, 1927
