= Prophyllocnistis =

Scientific classification
- Kingdom: Animalia
- Phylum: Arthropoda
- Class: Insecta
- Order: Lepidoptera
- Family: Gracillariidae
- Subfamily: Phyllocnistinae
- Genus: Prophyllocnistis; Davis, 1994

Species
- See text

Genus of moths

Prophyllocnistis is a genus of moths in the family Gracillariidae.

== Species ==
- Prophyllocnistis epidrimys Davis, 1994
