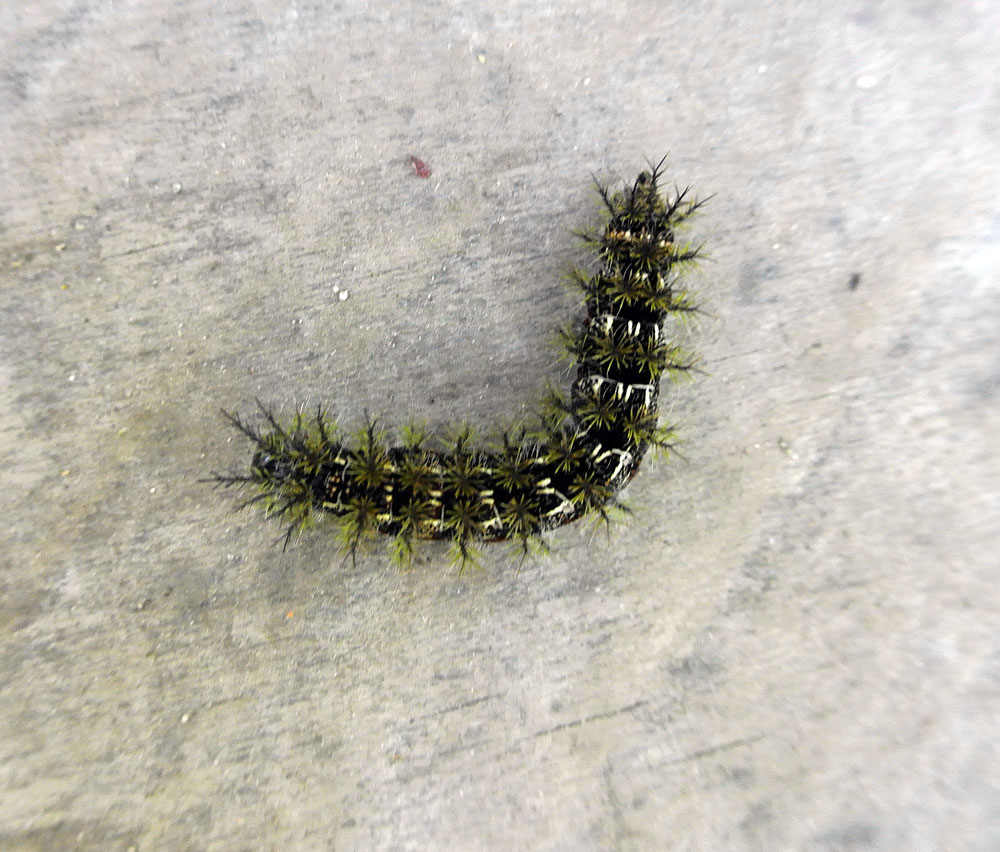
- Adetomeris erythrops

Scientific classification
- Domain: Eukaryota
- Kingdom: Animalia
- Phylum: Arthropoda
- Class: Insecta
- Order: Lepidoptera
- Family: Saturniidae
- Subfamily: Hemileucinae
- Genus: Adetomeris; Michener, 1949

= Adetomeris =

Genus of moths

Adetomeris is a genus of moths in the family Saturniidae first described by Charles Duncan Michener in 1949.

== Species ==
- Adetomeris erythrops (Blanchard, 1852)
- Adetomeris microphthalma (Izquierdo, 1895)
