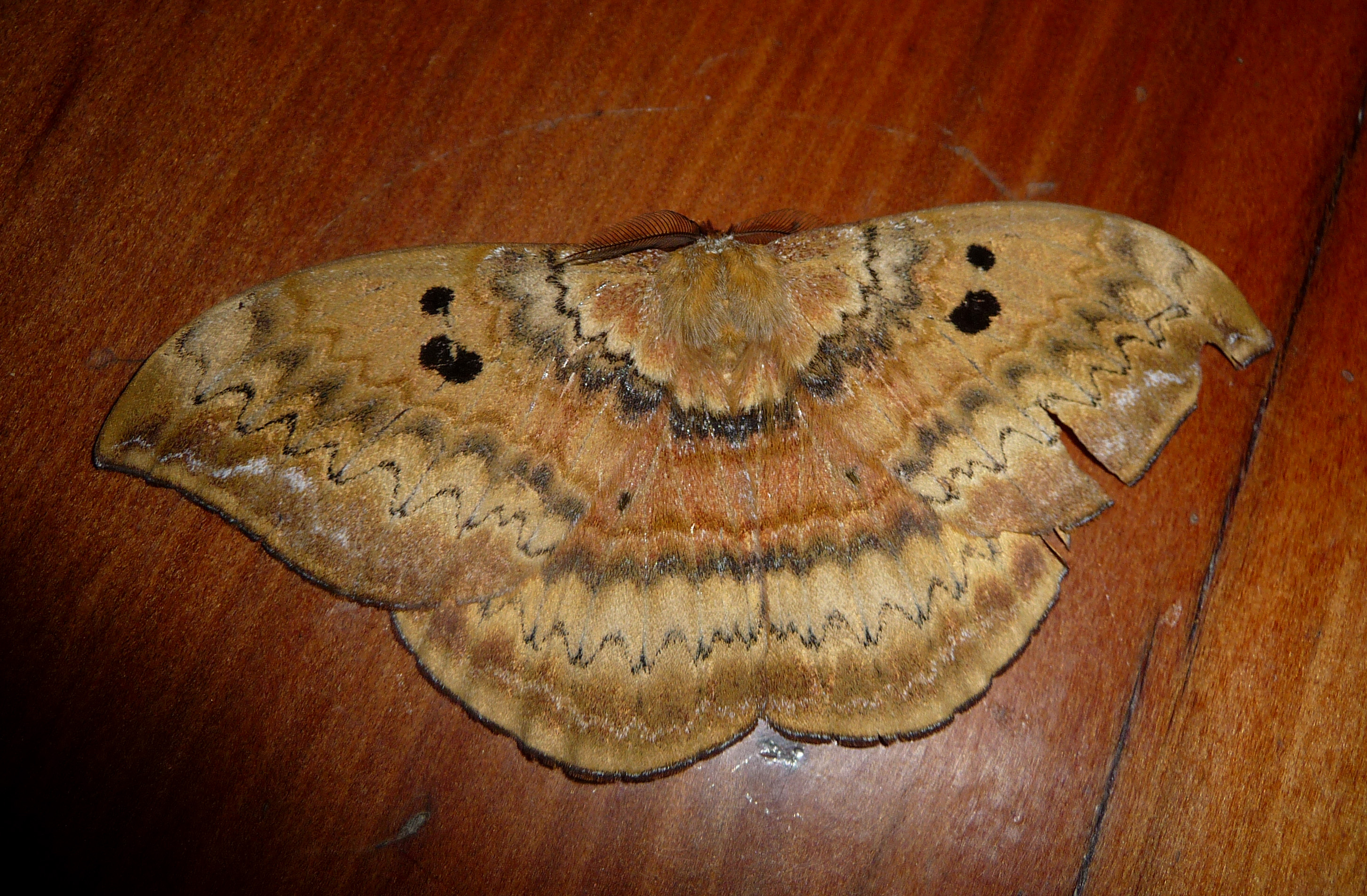
- Janoides laverna

Scientific classification
- Kingdom: Animalia
- Phylum: Arthropoda
- Class: Insecta
- Order: Lepidoptera
- Family: Saturniidae
- Subfamily: Cercophaninae
- Genus: Janiodes; Jordan, 1924

= Janiodes =

Genus of moths

Janiodes is a genus of moths in the family Saturniidae first described by Karl Jordan in 1924.

== Species ==
- Janiodes bethulia (Druce, 1904)
- Janiodes cuscoensis Brechlin & Meister, 2008
- Janiodes dognini Jordan, 1924
- Janiodes ecuadorensis (Dognin, 1890)
- Janiodes laverna (Druce, 1890)
- Janiodes manzanoi Pinas-Rubio, 2000
- Janiodes napoensis Brechlin, Meister & Kaech, 2009
- Janiodes nigropuncta (Druce, 1906)
- Janiodes oxapampensis Brechlin & Meister, 2008
- Janiodes praeclara Naumann et al., in press
- Janiodes pichinchensis Brechlin, Meister & Kaech, 2009
- Janiodes russea (Dognin, 1912)
- Janiodes virgata Jordan, 1924
