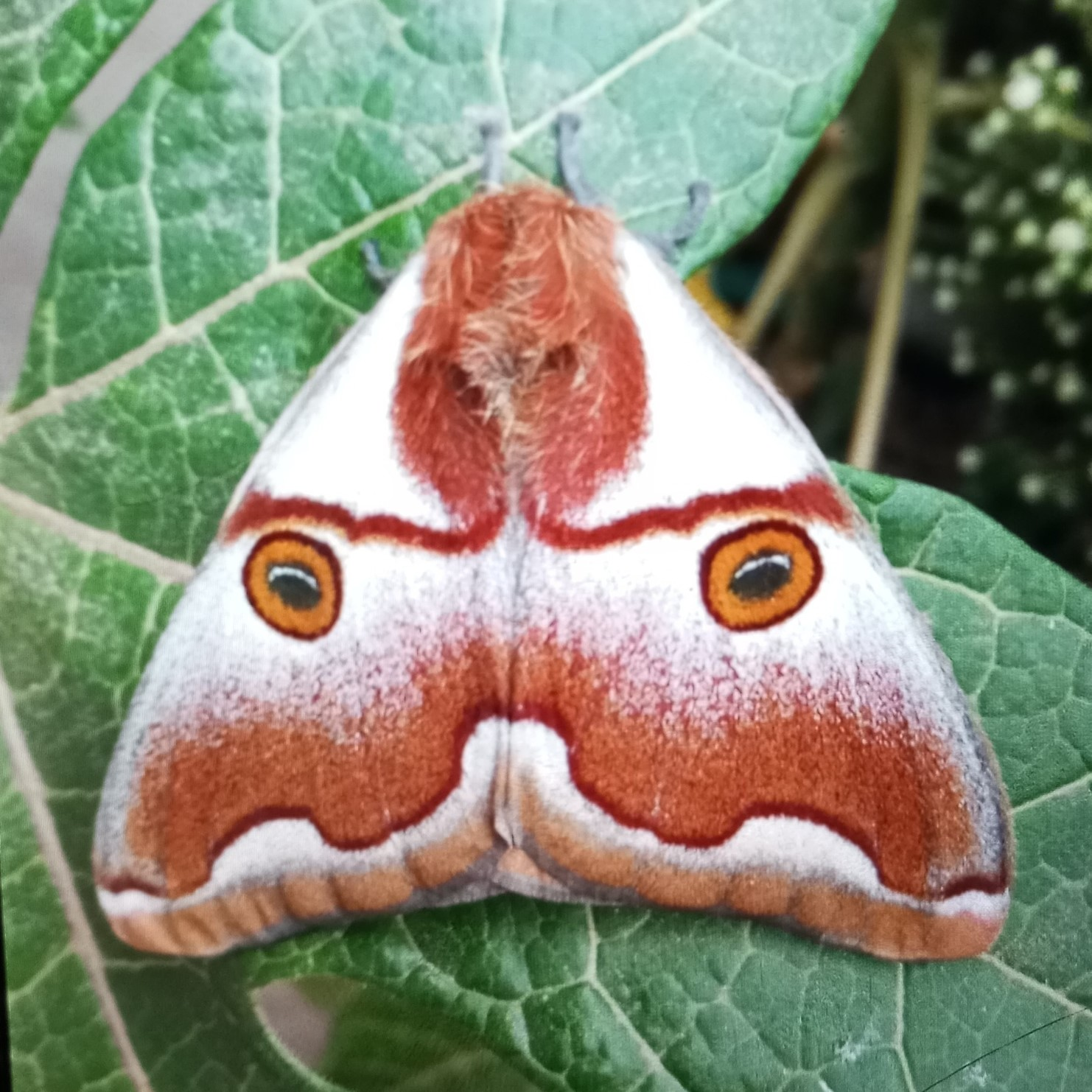
- Polythysana apollina

Scientific classification
- Domain: Eukaryota
- Kingdom: Animalia
- Phylum: Arthropoda
- Class: Insecta
- Order: Lepidoptera
- Family: Saturniidae
- Subfamily: Hemileucinae
- Genus: Polythysana; Walker, 1855

= Polythysana =

Genus of moths

Polythysana is a genus of moths in the family Saturniidae first described by Francis Walker in 1855.

== Species ==
- Polythysana apollina R. Felder & Rogenhofer, 1874
- Polythysana cinerascens (Philippi, 1859)
- Polythysana rubrescens (Blanchard, 1852)
