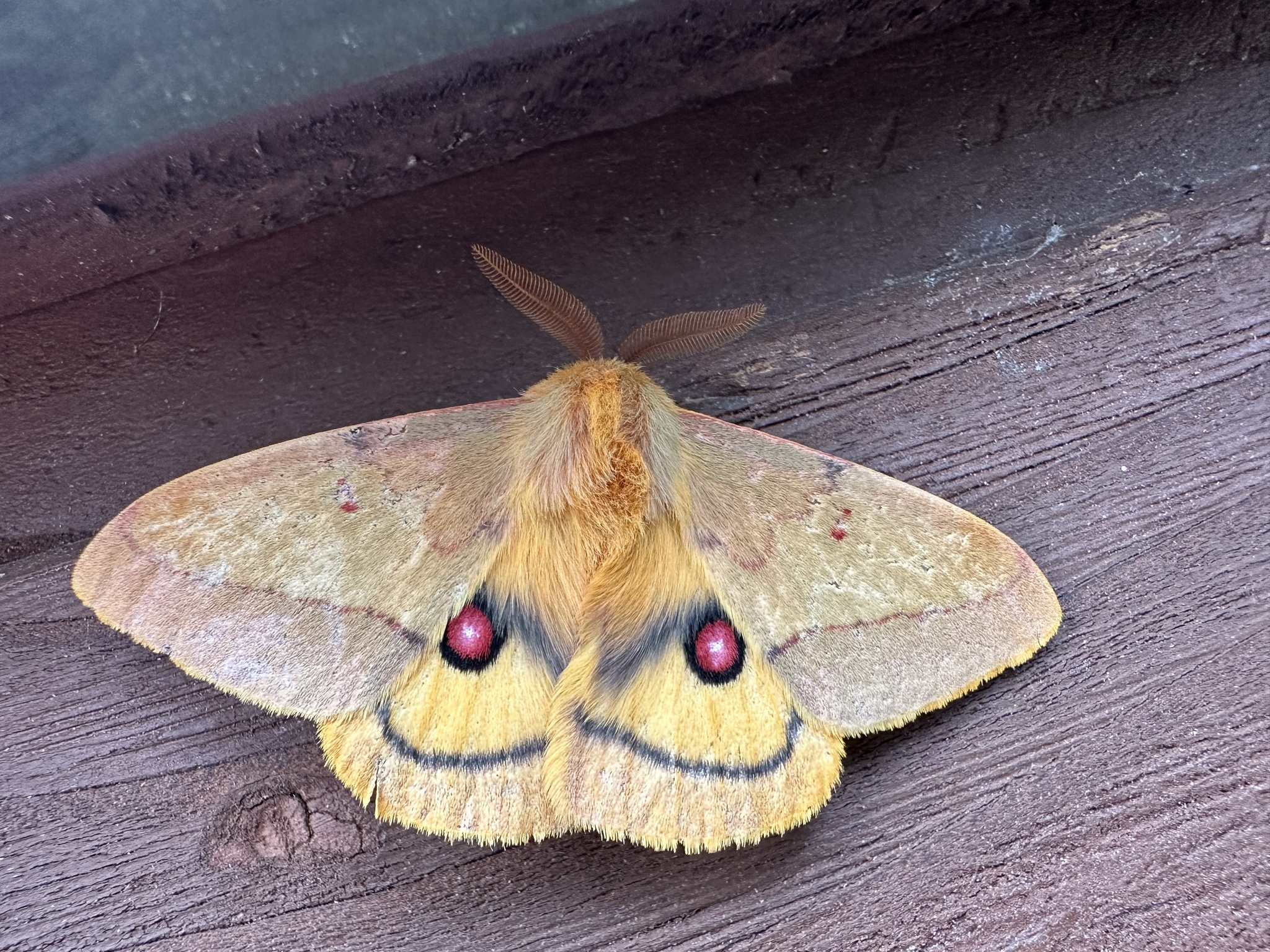

Scientific classification
- Domain: Eukaryota
- Kingdom: Animalia
- Phylum: Arthropoda
- Class: Insecta
- Order: Lepidoptera
- Family: Saturniidae
- Genus: Adetomeris
- Species: A. erythrops

Binomial name
- Adetomeris erythrops (Blanchard, 1852)

Synonyms
- Adetomeris acharon Butler, 1882; Adetomeris annaehildegardae Bryk, 1945; Adetomeris betzholdi Ureta, 1942; Adetomeris bullocki Ureta, 1942; Adetomeris contulma Draudt, 1929; Adetomeris debilis Butler, 1882; Adetomeris erythrea Philippi, 1859; Adetomeris fusca Ureta, 1942; Adetomeris gayi Boisduval, 1875; Adetomeris griseoflava Philippi, 1860; Adetomeris herrerai Ureta, 1942; Adetomeris isquierdoi Draudt, 1929; Adetomeris jaffueli Ureta, 1942; Adetomeris lucasii Boisduval, 1875; Adetomeris olivacea Butler, 1882; Adetomeris reedi Ureta, 1942; Adetomeris ruizi Ureta, 1942

= Adetomeris erythrops =

Species of moth

Adetomeris erythrops is a species of moth in the subfamily Hemileucinae. It is native to Chile and Argentina. The flight period is from December to May. It feeds from a number of native and exotic plant species such as Robinia pseudoacacia, Populus sp., Nothofagus sp., Puya chilensis, Juglans regia, Maytenus boaria, Rubus ulmifolius, Acacia melanoxylon and Pinus radiata.
