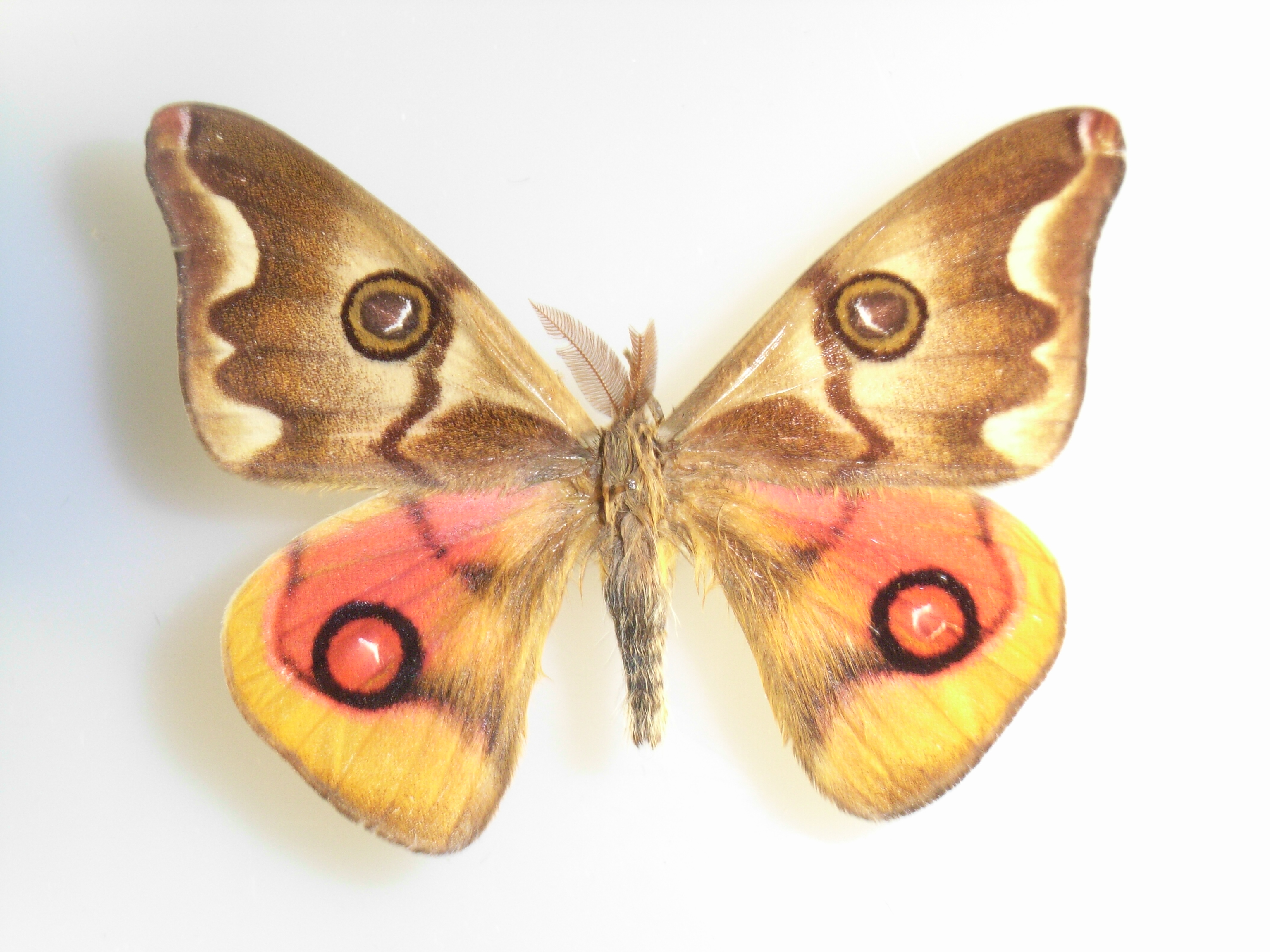

Scientific classification
- Kingdom: Animalia
- Phylum: Arthropoda
- Class: Insecta
- Order: Lepidoptera
- Family: Saturniidae
- Genus: Polythysana
- Species: P. cinerascens

Binomial name
- Polythysana cinerascens (Philippi, 1859)

Synonyms
- Attacus cinerascens Philippi, 1859; Attacus andromeda Philippi, 1859; Polythysana edmondsii Butler, 1882; Polythysana latchami Ureta, 1943

= Polythysana cinerascens =

Species of moth

Polythysana cinerascens is a species of moth of the family Saturniidae. It is found in Chile.

Larvae have been recorded on Lithraea caustica.
