= Prophyllocnistis epidrimys =

Scientific classification
- Kingdom: Animalia
- Phylum: Arthropoda
- Class: Insecta
- Order: Lepidoptera
- Family: Gracillariidae
- Genus: Prophyllocnistis
- Species: P. epidrimys

Binomial name
- Prophyllocnistis epidrimys Davis, 1994

Synonyms
- Prophyllocnistis epidrymis Vargas & Parra, 2005

Species of moth

Prophyllocnistis epidrimys is a moth of the family Gracillariidae. It is known from Chile.

Adults are on wing in March in one generation.

The larvae feed on Drimys winteri, Drimys winteri andina and Drimys winteri chiliensis. They mine the leaves of their host plant.
