= Angelabella =

Scientific classification
- Kingdom: Animalia
- Phylum: Arthropoda
- Clade: Pancrustacea
- Class: Insecta
- Order: Lepidoptera
- Family: Gracillariidae
- Genus: Angelabella; Vargas & Parra, 2005
- Species: A. tecomae

Binomial name
- Angelabella tecomae Vargas & Parra, 2005

Genus of moths

Angelabella tecomae is a moth of the family Gracillariidae and the only species in the genus Angelabella. It is known from Chile.

The larvae feed on Tecoma fulva. They mine the leaves of their host plant.
