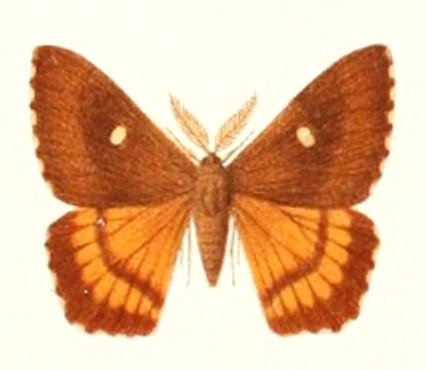
- Microdulia mirabilis, male

Scientific classification
- Kingdom: Animalia
- Phylum: Arthropoda
- Class: Insecta
- Order: Lepidoptera
- Family: Saturniidae
- Subfamily: Cercophaninae

Genera
- See text

= Cercophaninae =

Subfamily of moths

Cercophaninae is a subfamily of the family Saturniidae, and was, until recently, treated as a separate family, Cercophanidae.

This subfamily contains the following genera:

- Cercophana C. Felder, 1862
- Janiodes Jordan, 1924
- Microdulia Jordan, 1924
- Neocercophana Izquierdo, 1895
