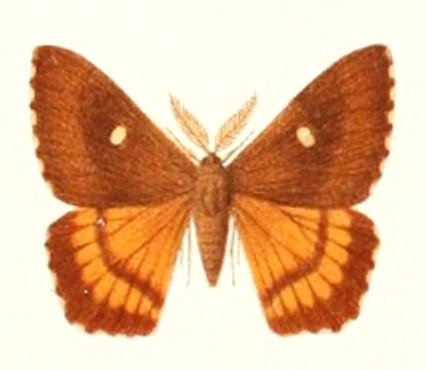
- Male

Scientific classification
- Kingdom: Animalia
- Phylum: Arthropoda
- Class: Insecta
- Order: Lepidoptera
- Family: Saturniidae
- Subfamily: Cercophaninae
- Genus: Microdulia; Jordan, 1924
- Species: M. mirabilis

Binomial name
- Microdulia mirabilis (Rothschild, 1895)

Synonyms
- Cercophana mirabilis Rothschild, 1895; Lasicampa izquierdoi Silva, 1920

= Microdulia =

Species of moth

Microdulia is a genus of moths in the family Saturniidae first described by Karl Jordan in 1924. It contains only one species, Microdulia mirabilis, described by Rothschild in 1895, which is found between 35° and 47°S in Chile and Neuquén in Argentina.

The wingspan is 18–19 mm for males and 20–23 mm for females.

The larvae defoliate Nothofagus obliqua.
