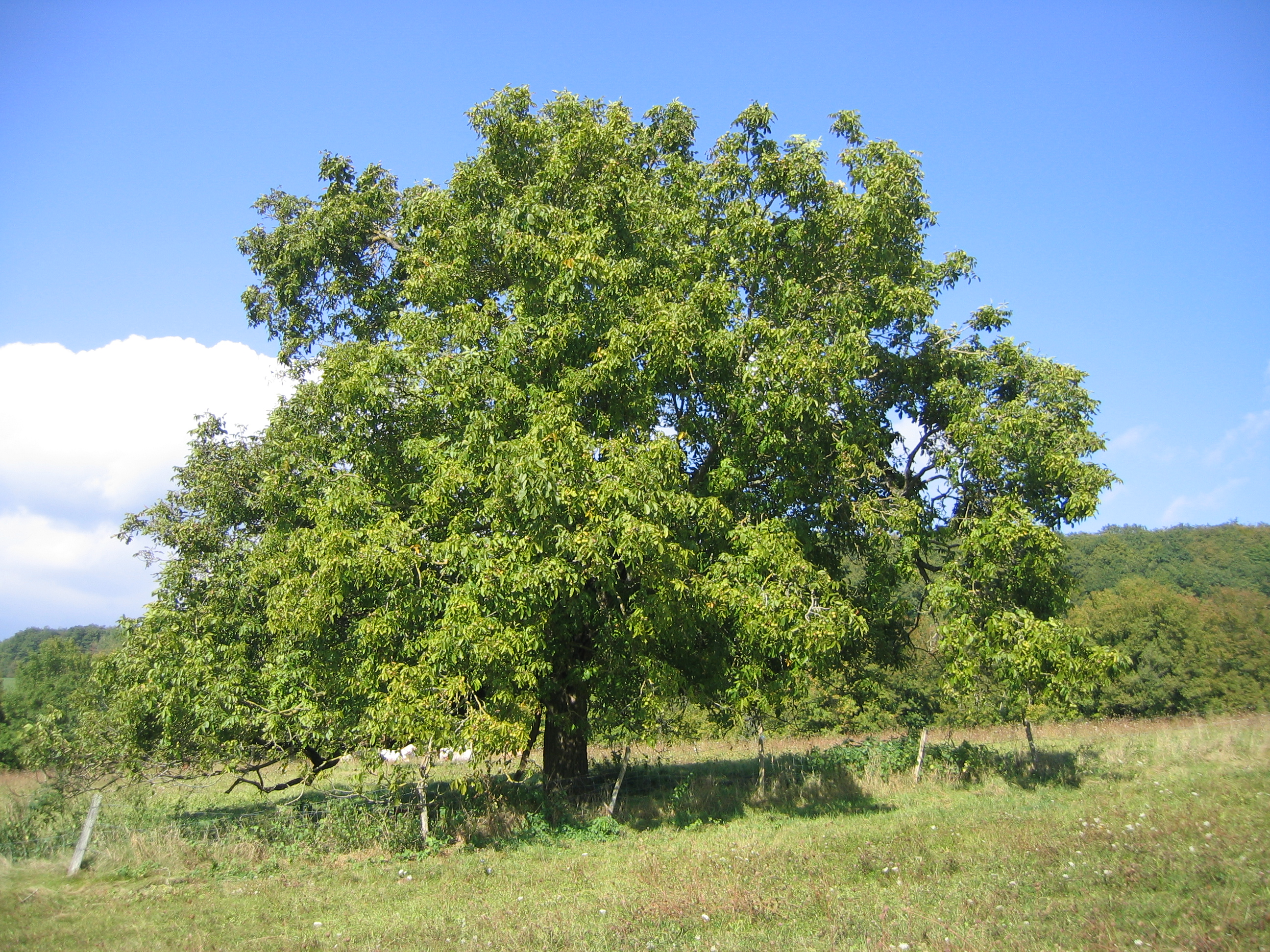
- Mature walnut tree

Conservation status
- Least Concern (IUCN 3.1)

Scientific classification
- Kingdom: Plantae
- Clade: Tracheophytes
- Clade: Angiosperms
- Clade: Eudicots
- Clade: Rosids
- Order: Fagales
- Family: Juglandaceae
- Genus: Juglans
- Section: Juglans sect. Juglans
- Species: J. regia

Binomial name
- Juglans regia L.
- Distribution map

Synonyms
- List: J. duclouxiana Dode; J. fallax Dode; J. kamaonica (C. de Candolle) Dode; J. orientis Dode; J. regia subsp. fallax (Dode) Popov; J. regia subsp. kamaonica (C. de Candolle) Mansf.; J. regia subsp. turcomanica Popov; J. regia var. orientis (Dode) Kitam.; J. regia var. sinensis C. de Candolle; J. sinensis (C. de Candolle) Dode

= Juglans regia =

Species of tree (walnut)

Juglans regia, known by various common names including the common walnut, English walnut, or Persian walnut amongst other names, is a species of walnut. It is native to Eurasia in at least southwest and central Asia and southeast Europe, but its exact natural area is obscure due to its long history of cultivation.

The species has numerous cultivars which produce the edible walnut consumed around the world and produced predominantly in China. It is widely cultivated across temperate regions throughout the world including those of Eurasia, Australia, and the Americas.

== Etymology ==
The genus name, Juglans, is derived from two Latin words, jovis, which means Jupiter, the chief god of the ancient Roman religion; and glans meaning an acorn or nut. The specific epithet, regia, is defined as royal in references the quality of the fruit and edible nuts.

== Description ==
Juglans regia is a large deciduous tree, attaining heights of 10–25 metres (35–80 feet), and a trunk up to 2 m (6 1/2 ft) in diameter, commonly with a short trunk and broad crown. The tallest accurately measured specimen is in the Lagodekhi Protected Areas of the country of Georgia, 29 m (95 ft) tall, and the stoutest in Spain, 9 m (30 ft) in girth. Heights of 34 m in the wild in Kyrgyzstan and 32 m in cultivation in Britain have been reported, but not verified.

The bark is smooth, olive-brown when young and silvery-grey on older branches, and features scattered broad fissures with a rougher texture. Like all walnuts, the pith of the twigs contains air spaces; this chambered pith is creamy-white at first, becoming brown in older twigs. The leaves are alternately arranged, 20–45 cm (8–17 1/2 in) long, odd-pinnate with (3–)5–9 (most often 7) leaflets, arranged in opposite pairs with one terminal leaflet. The largest leaflets are the three at the apex, 10–20 cm (4–8 in) long and 6–10 cm (2 1/2–4 in) broad; the basal pair of leaflets are much smaller, 5–8 cm (2–3 in) long. The margins of the leaflets are entire, but with toothed margins on seedlings, and in the cultivar 'Laciniata'. The leaves open fairly late in the spring (typically mid May in Britain), and are red-brown at first, becoming their mature dark yellow-toned green by mid June.

The male flowers are in drooping catkins 5–10 cm (2–4 in) long, and the female flowers are terminal, in clusters of two to five, ripening in the autumn into a fruit with a green, semi-fleshy husk and a brown, corrugated nut. The whole fruit, including the husk, falls in autumn with the husk breaking open; the seed is a large and edible nut with a rich flavour; the shell is thick in wild populations, while most cultivated plants have been selected for a thin shell.

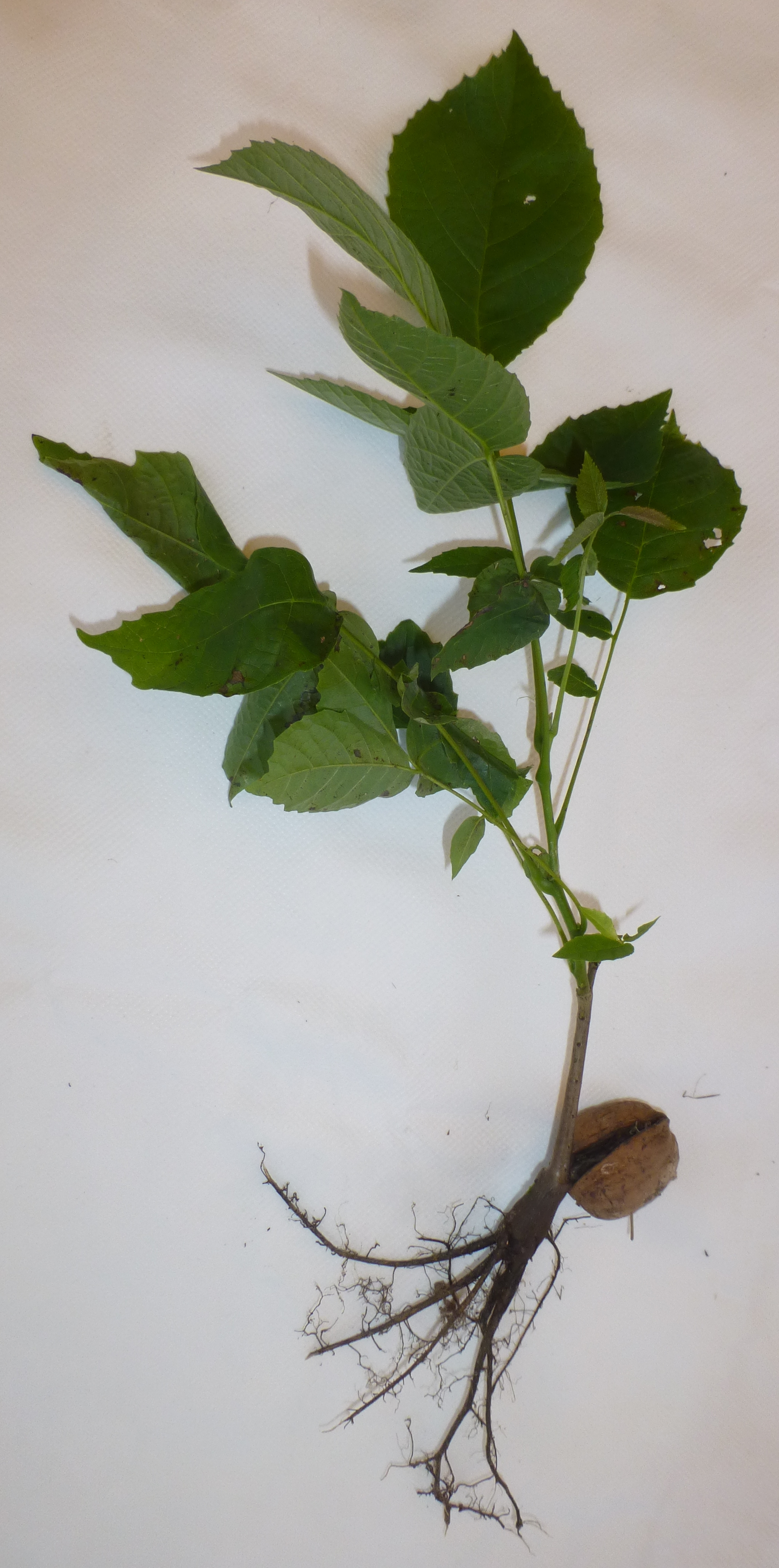
Seedling; note the serrated leaf margins

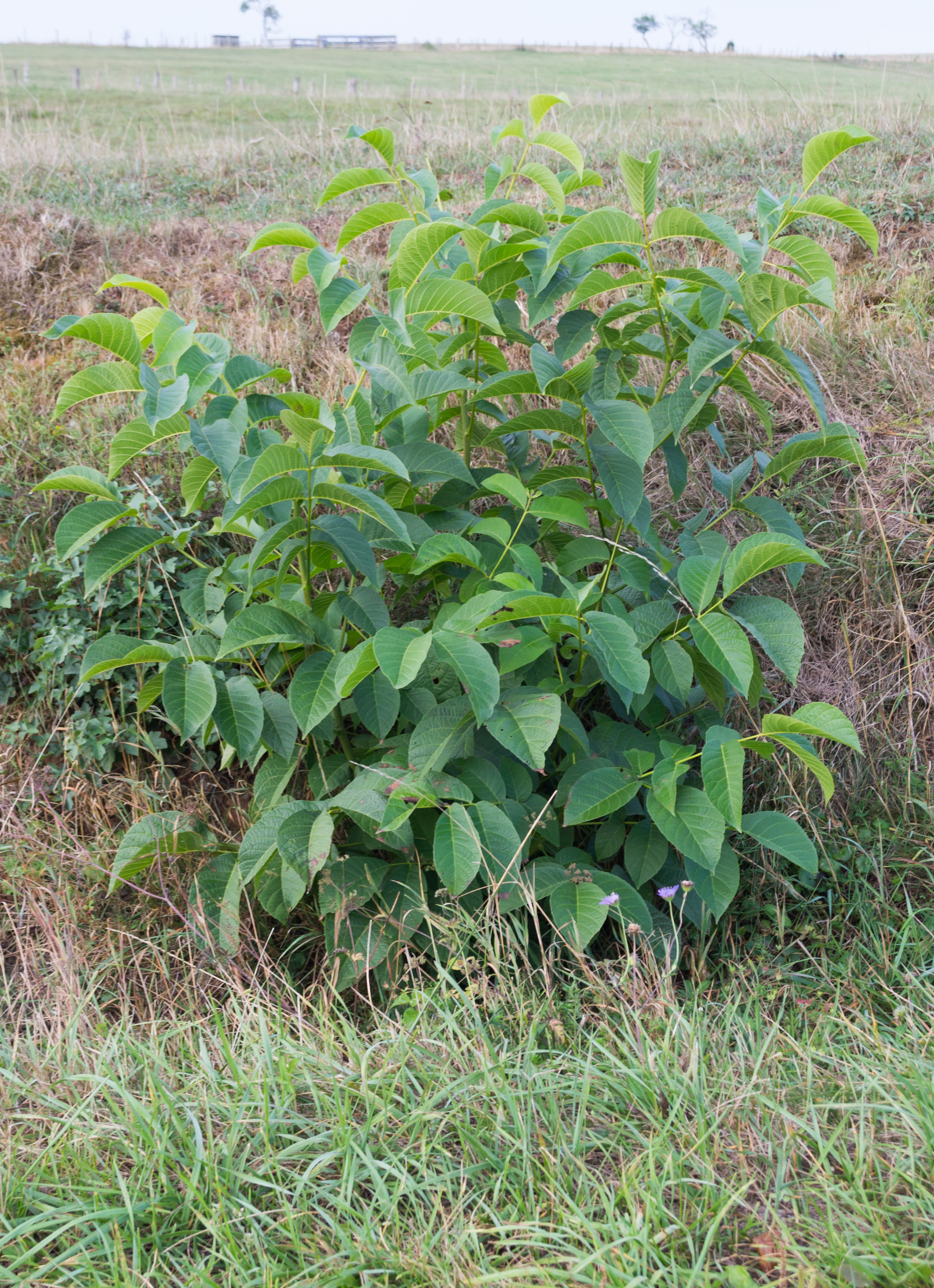
Young tree

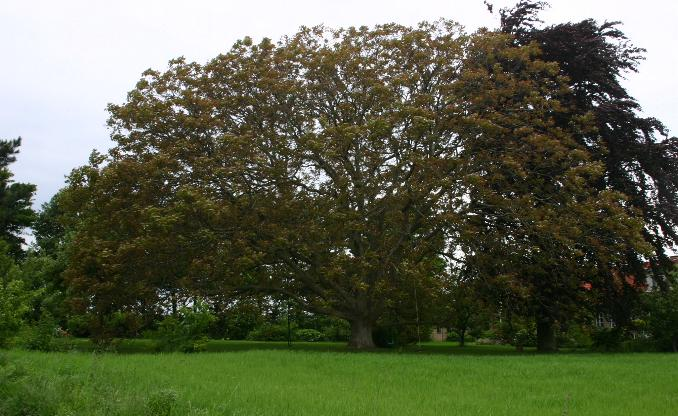
Mature tree

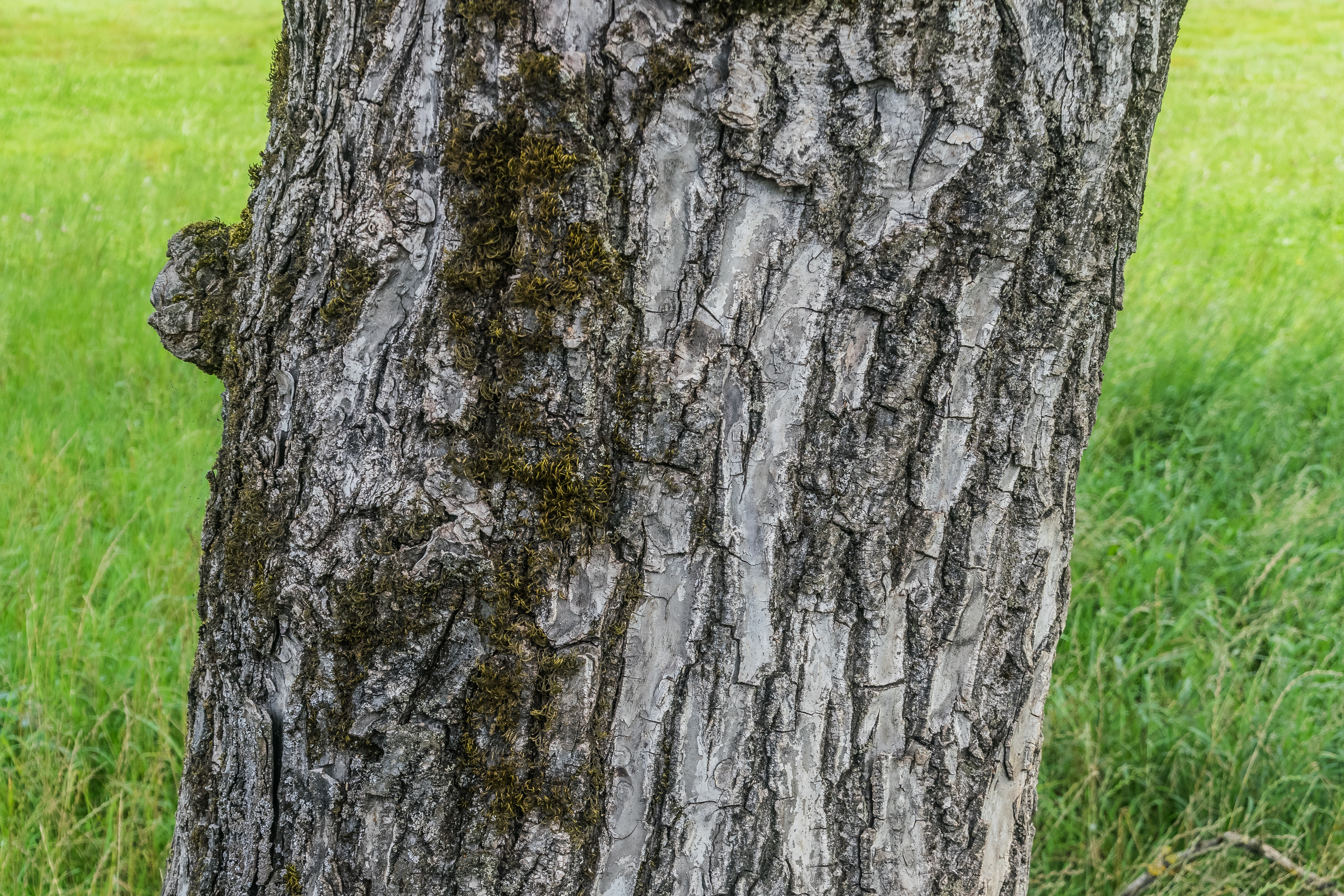
Bark

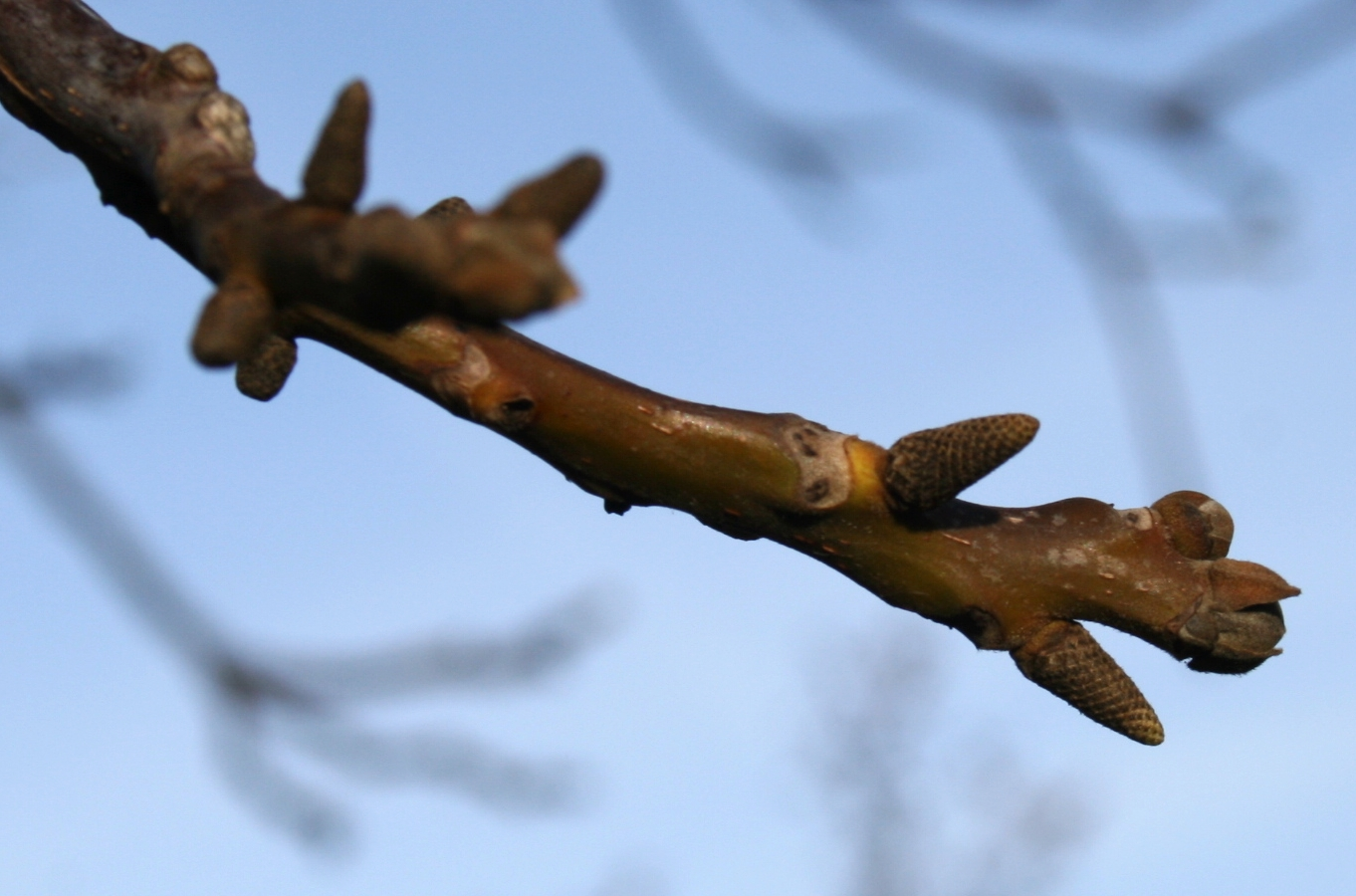
Buds

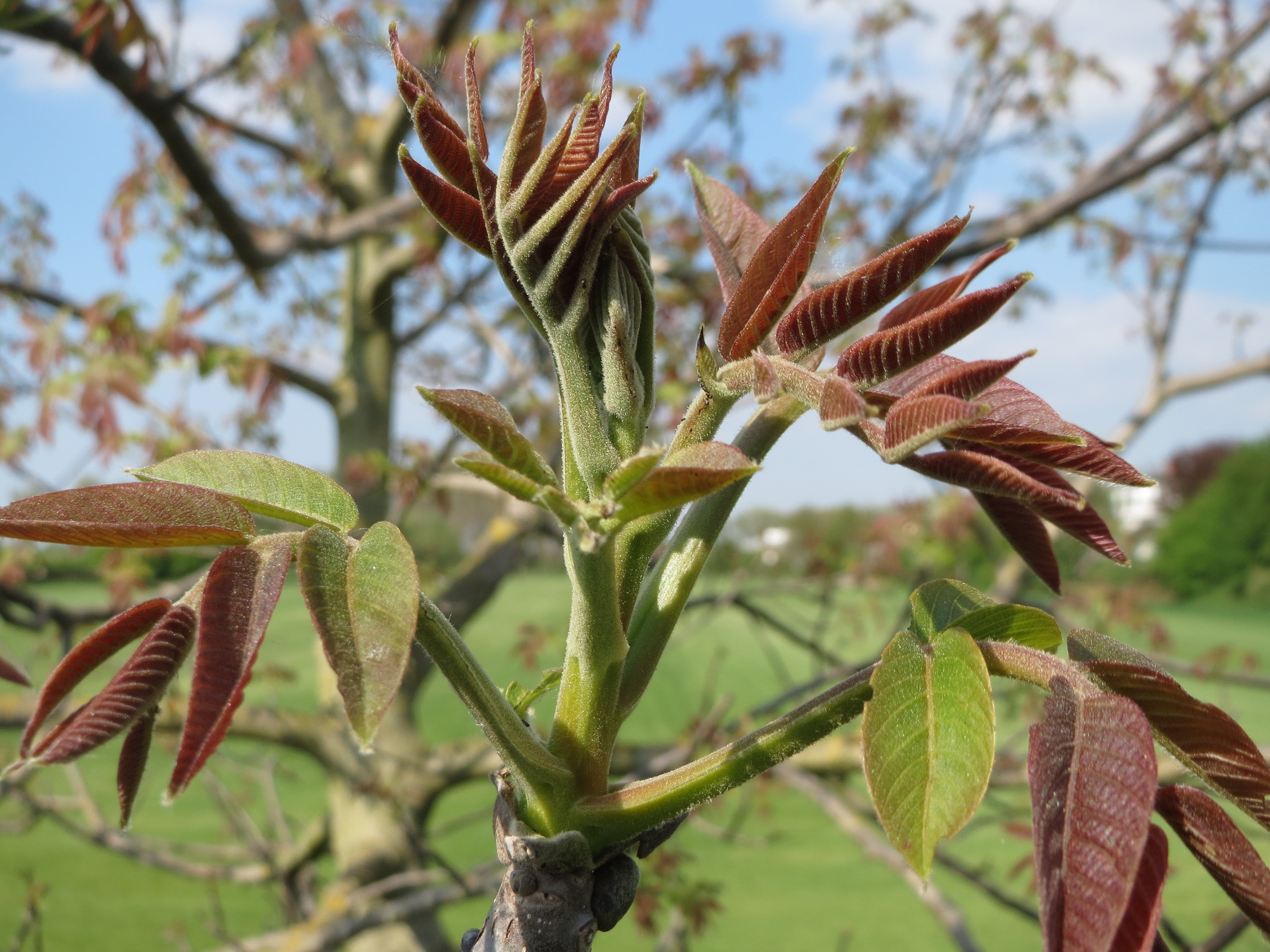
The new leaves in spring have a distinctive red-brown colour at first

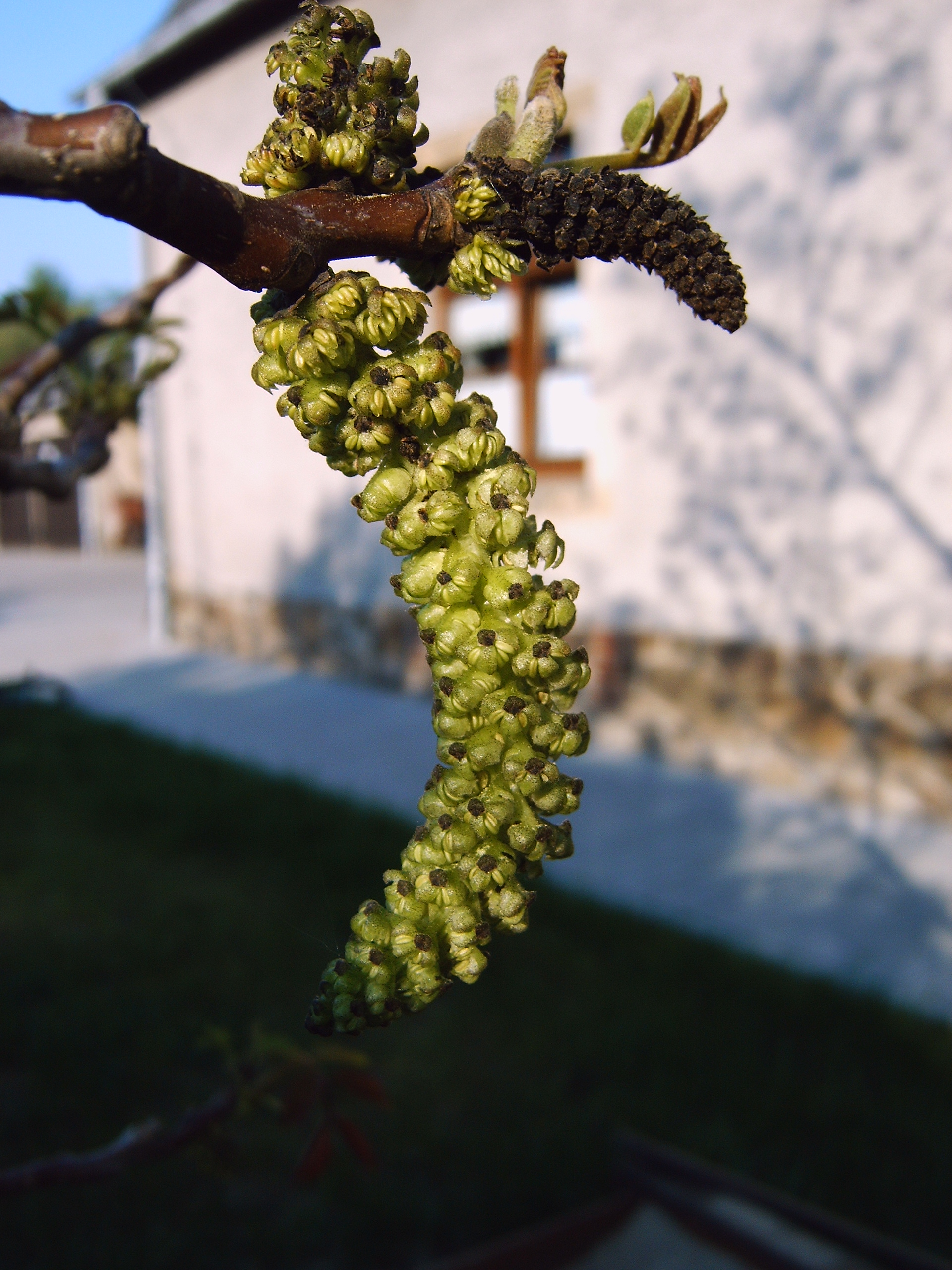
Male flower

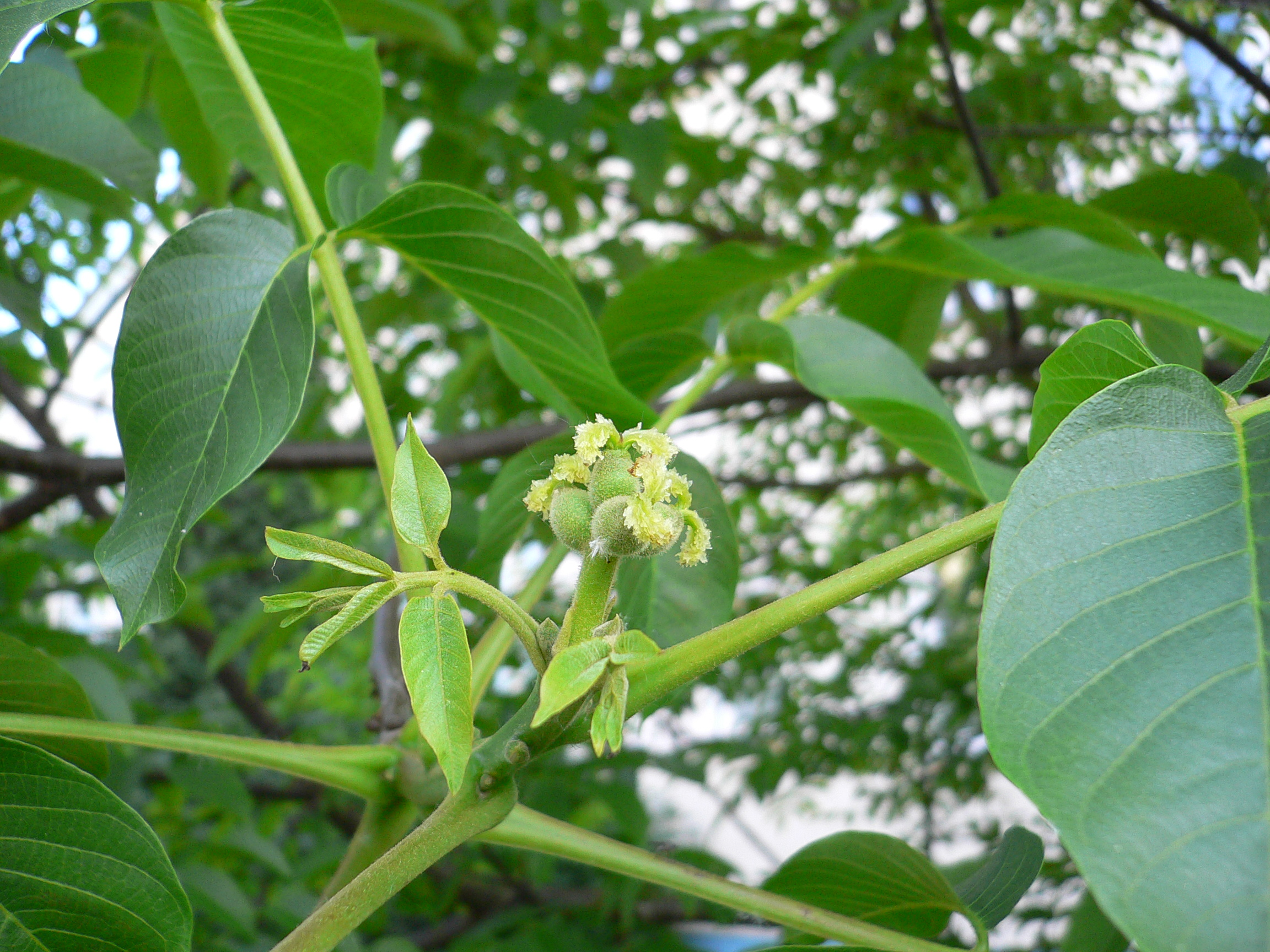
Female flower

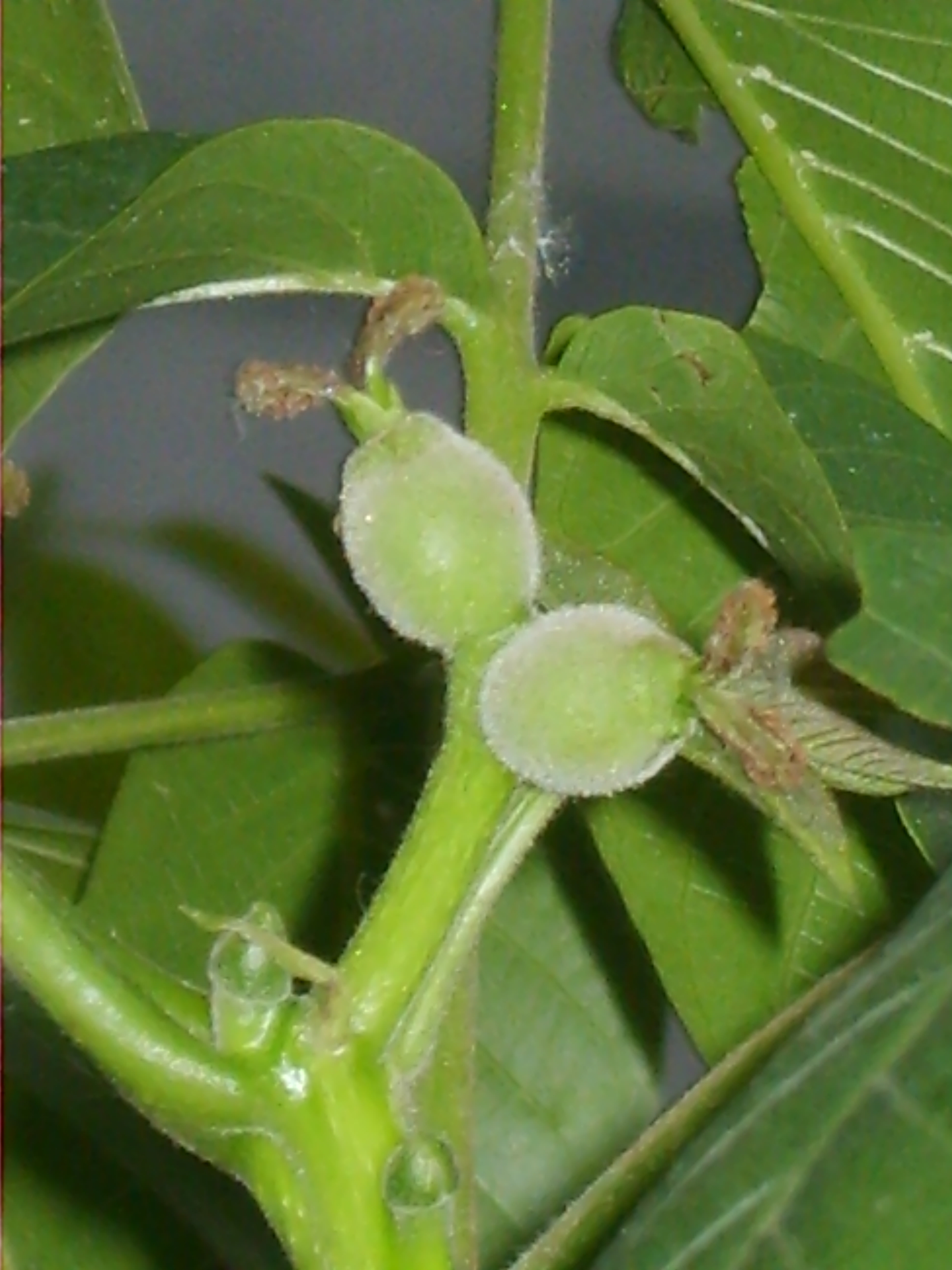
Fertilized flowers

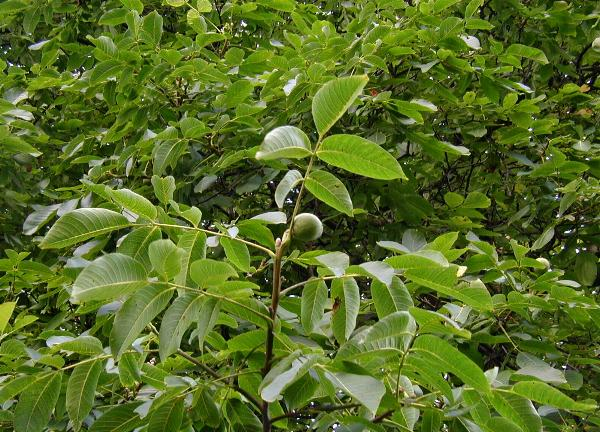
Foliage

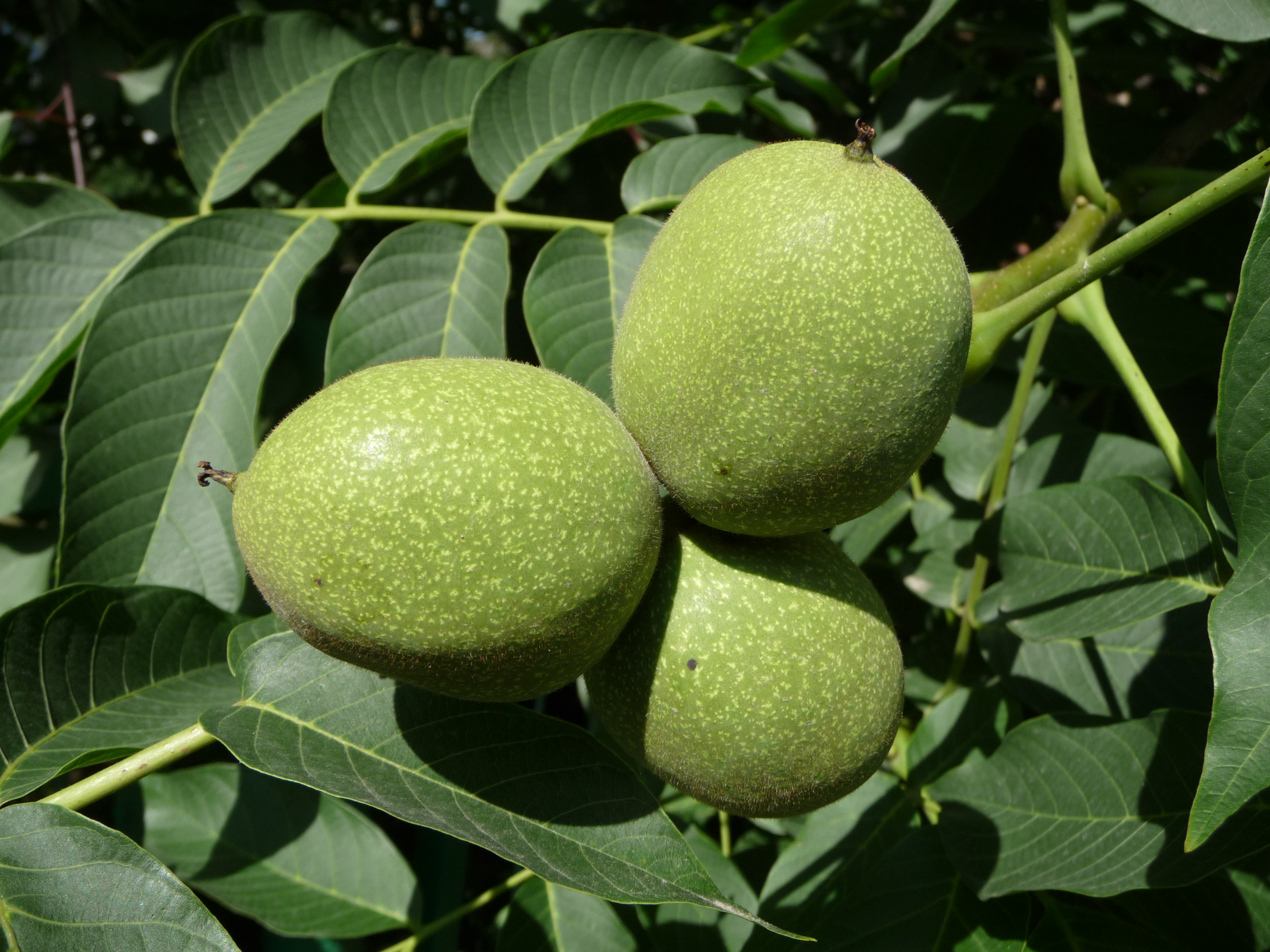
Fruit

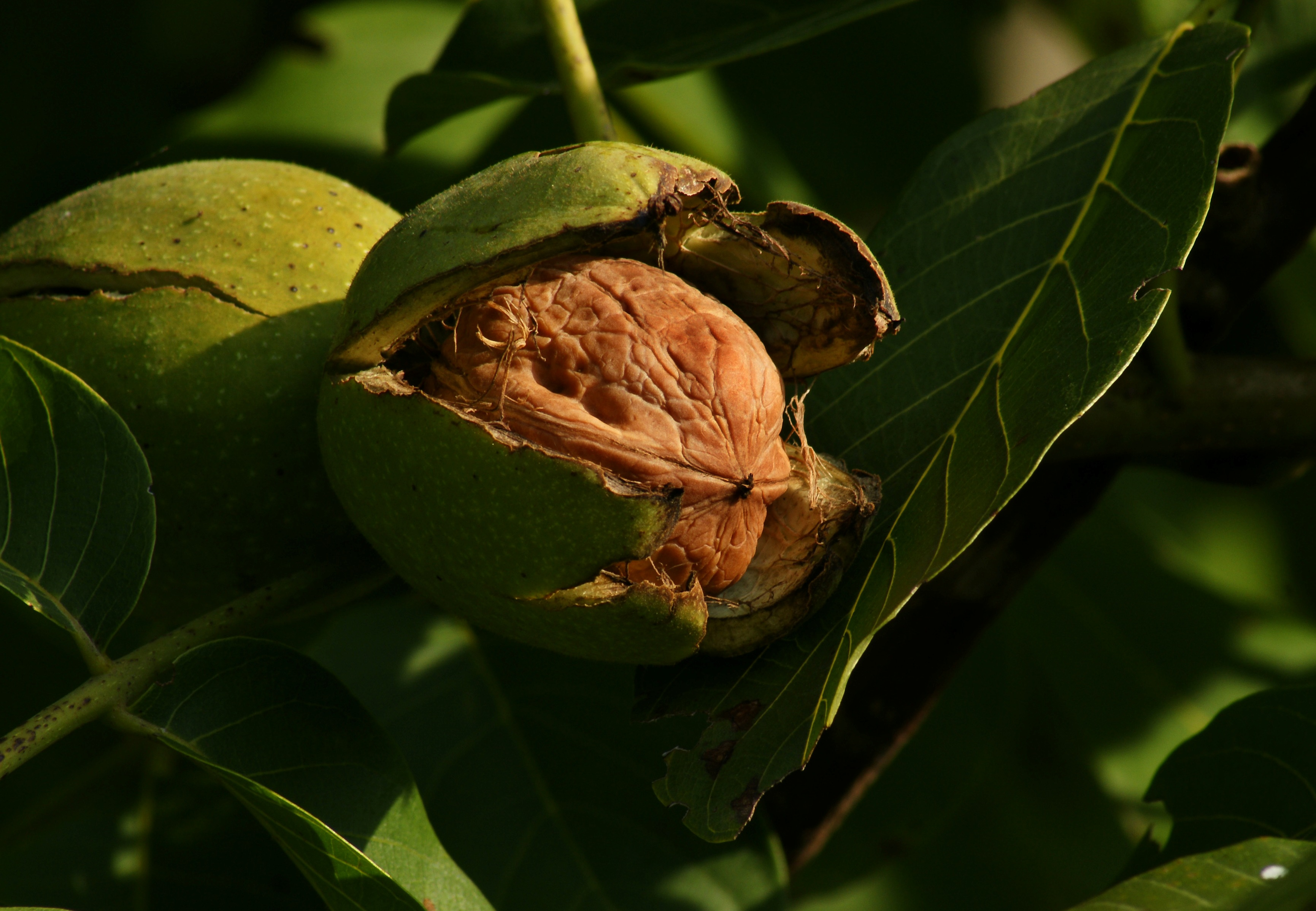
Seed

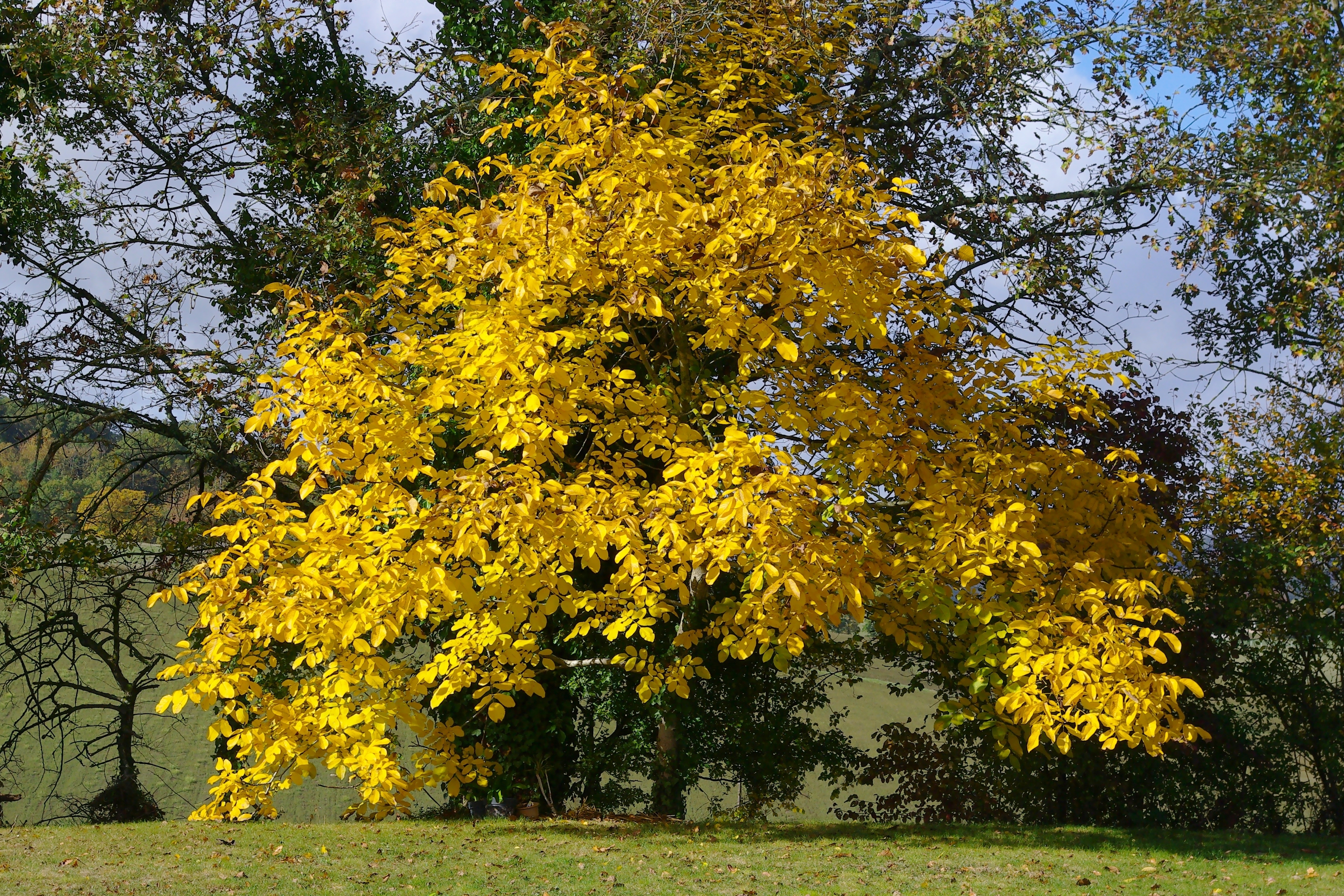
Habit (autumn)

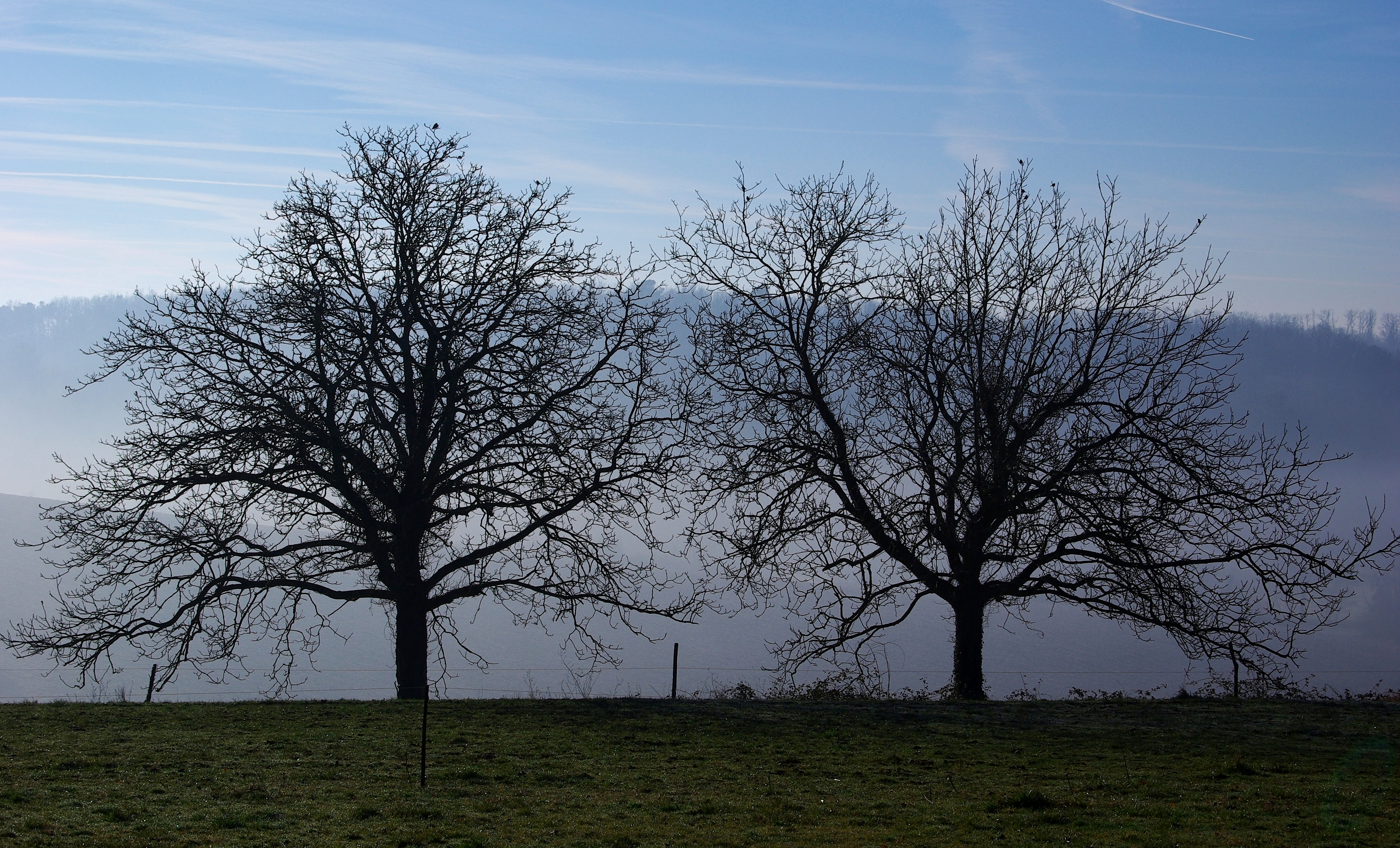
In winter, France

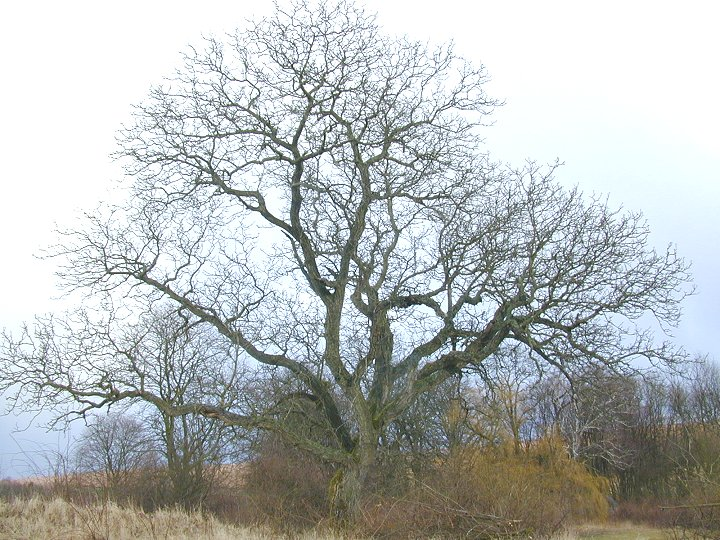
Old tree

== Distribution and habitat ==
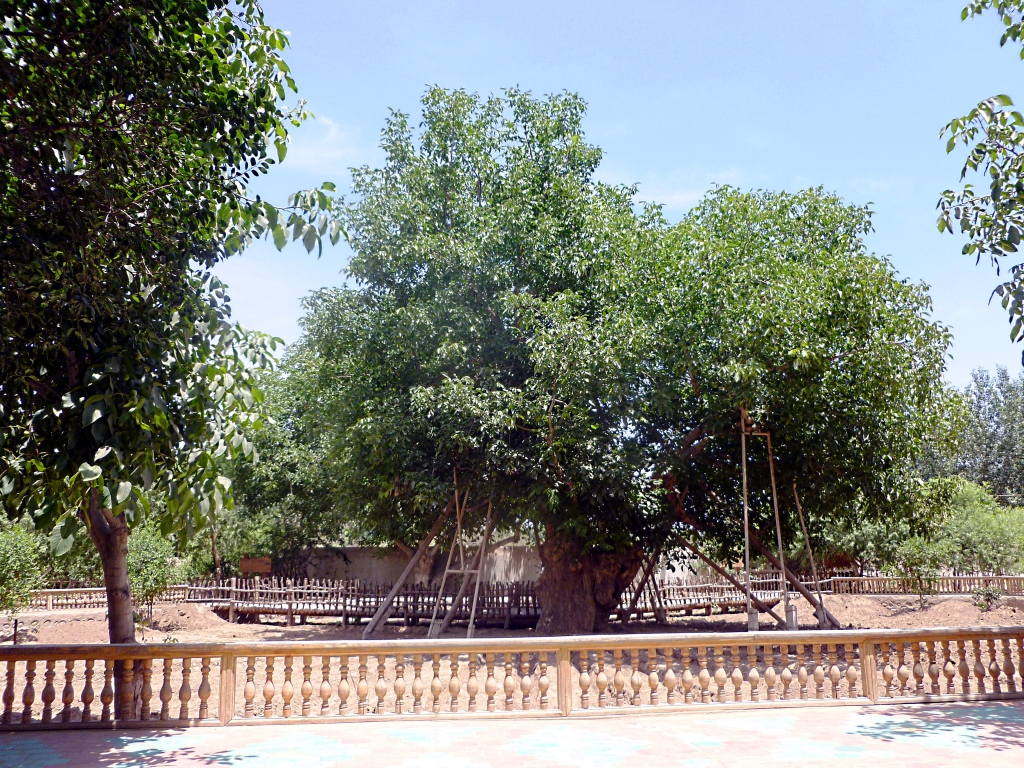
A walnut tree claimed to be the oldest walnut tree in the world, near Khotan, Xinjiang, China, in 2011

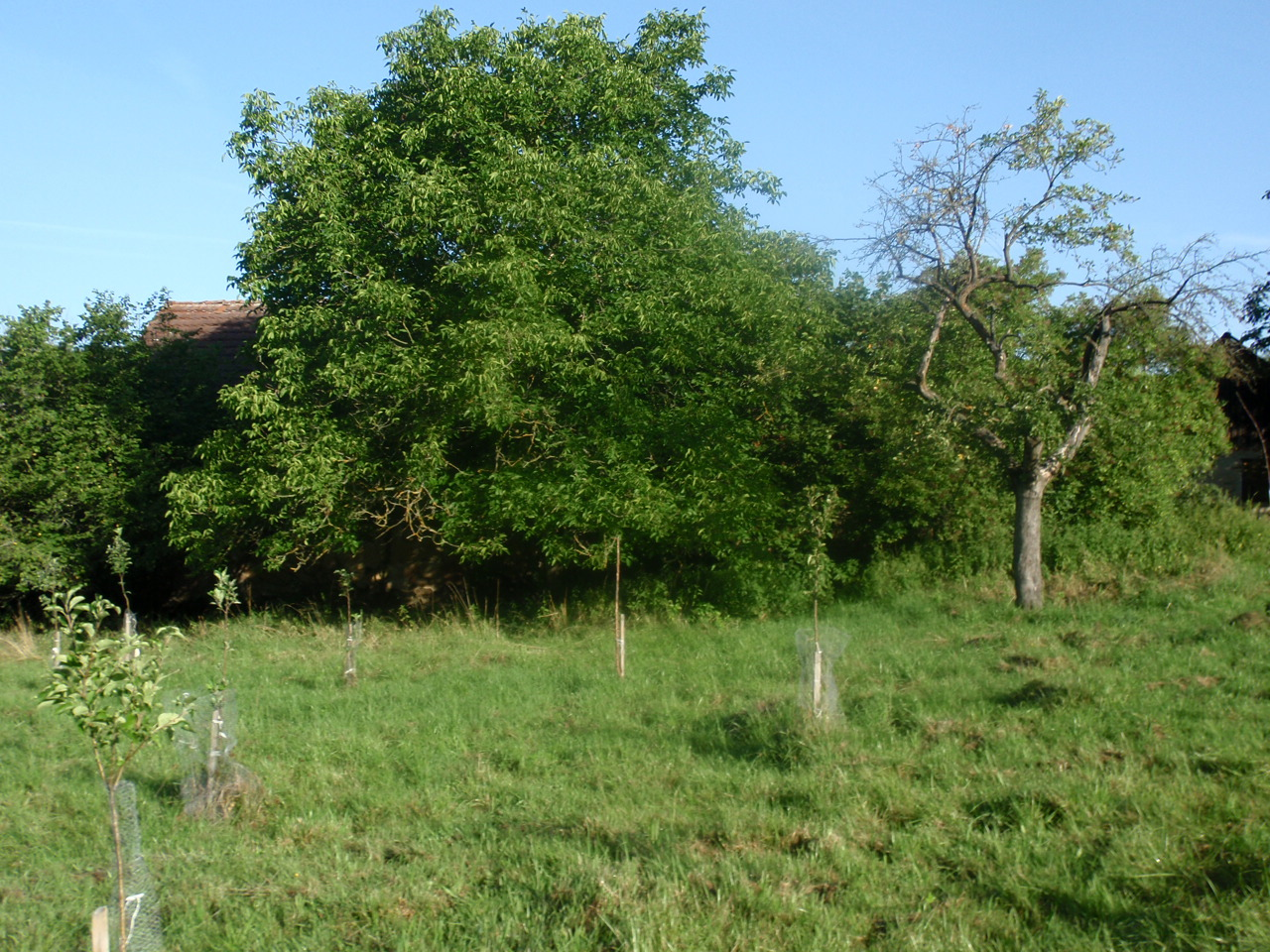
In August, Czech Republic

=== Original habitat ===
One of the centres of origin and diversity of J. regia is Iran, and another further northeast in Central Asia. In Central Asia, genetic diversity is very patchy, with the highest diversity found around Sariosiyo in Uzbekistan, and conspicuously lower in the Arslanbob forests in Kyrgyzstan (these now thought to be of cultivated origin). Another native glacial refugium population with high genetic diversity is found on the southern fringes of the Alps in northeast Italy. However, as with other old and widespread cultivated plants, it is not easy to reconstruct the original distribution and determine the borders of the past natural ranges. There are many reports concerning the earliest fossil pollen and nuts of J. regia, and the conclusions that various authors draw are somewhat contradictory. Taken together these finds suggest that J. regia possibly survived the last glaciations in several refugia, as the compilation of the data shows most likely southern Europe, the Near East, China, and the Himalaya.

The largest forests are in Kyrgyzstan, where trees occur in extensive forests at 1,000–2,000 m (3,300–6,600 ft) altitude, notably at Arslanbob in Jalal-Abad Province.

=== Global introduction ===
The earliest evidence of walnuts in the Levant comes from wood remains dated to the Middle Bronze Age, discovered in northern Israel. The walnut is also referenced a single time in the Hebrew Bible. In the fourth century BC, Alexander the Great introduced this "Persian nut" (Theophrastus' καρυα ή Περσική) in Macedonian, Ancient Greek ancestral forms with lateral fruiting from Iran and Central Asia. They hybridized with terminal-bearing forms to give lateral-bearing trees with larger fruit. These lateral-bearers were spread in southern Europe and northern Africa by the Romans. Recent prospections in walnut populations of the Mediterranean Basin allowed to select interesting trees of this type. In the Middle Ages, the lateral-bearing character was introduced again in southern Turkey by merchants travelling along the Silk Road. J. regia germplasm in China is thought to have been introduced from Central Asia about 2,000 years ago, and in some areas has become naturalised. Cultivated J. regia was introduced into western and northern Europe very early, probably in Roman times, and to the Americas in the 17th century, by European colonists. Important nut-growing regions include California in the United States; France, Serbia, Greece, Bulgaria, Romania and Hungary in Europe; China in Asia; Baja California and Coahuila in Mexico; and Chile in Latin America. Lately, cultivation has spread to other regions, such as New Zealand and the southeast of Australia. It is cultivated extensively from 30° to 50° of latitude in the Northern Hemisphere and from 30° to 40° in the Southern Hemisphere. Its high-quality fruits are eaten both fresh or pressed for their richly flavoured oil; numerous cultivars have been selected for larger nuts with thinner shells.

== Genetic diversity ==
J. regia is highly diverse genetically, and has been extensively cultivated for possibly as long as 2,000 years in parts of west Asia and southern Europe.

Its closest relative is Juglans sigillata from western China and the far northeast of India; it differs chiefly in leaves with 9–11 leaflets, and nuts with a much thicker, harder shell.

== Ecology ==
It tends to grow taller and narrower in dense forest competition. It is a light-demanding species, requiring full sun to grow well.

Juglans regia is infested by Rhagoletis juglandis, commonly known as the walnut husk fly, which lays its eggs in the husks of walnut fruit.

Other plants often will not grow under walnut trees because the fallen leaves and husks contain juglone, a chemical which acts as a natural herbicide. Horses that eat walnut leaves may develop laminitis, a hoof ailment.

== Cultivation ==
Walnut production (shelled) – 2022 (millions of tonnes)
| China | 1.40 |
| United States | 0.68 |
| Iran | 0.36 |
| Turkey | 0.34 |
| Mexico | 0.18 |
| World | 3.87 |
Source: FAOSTAT of the United Nations

Walnut trees grow best in rich, deep soil with full sun and long summers, such as the California central valley. Juglans hindsii and J. hindsii × J. regia are often used as grafting stock for J. regia. Mature trees may reach 15 m (50 ft) in height and width, and live more than 200 years, developing massive trunks more than 2.4 m (8 ft) thick.

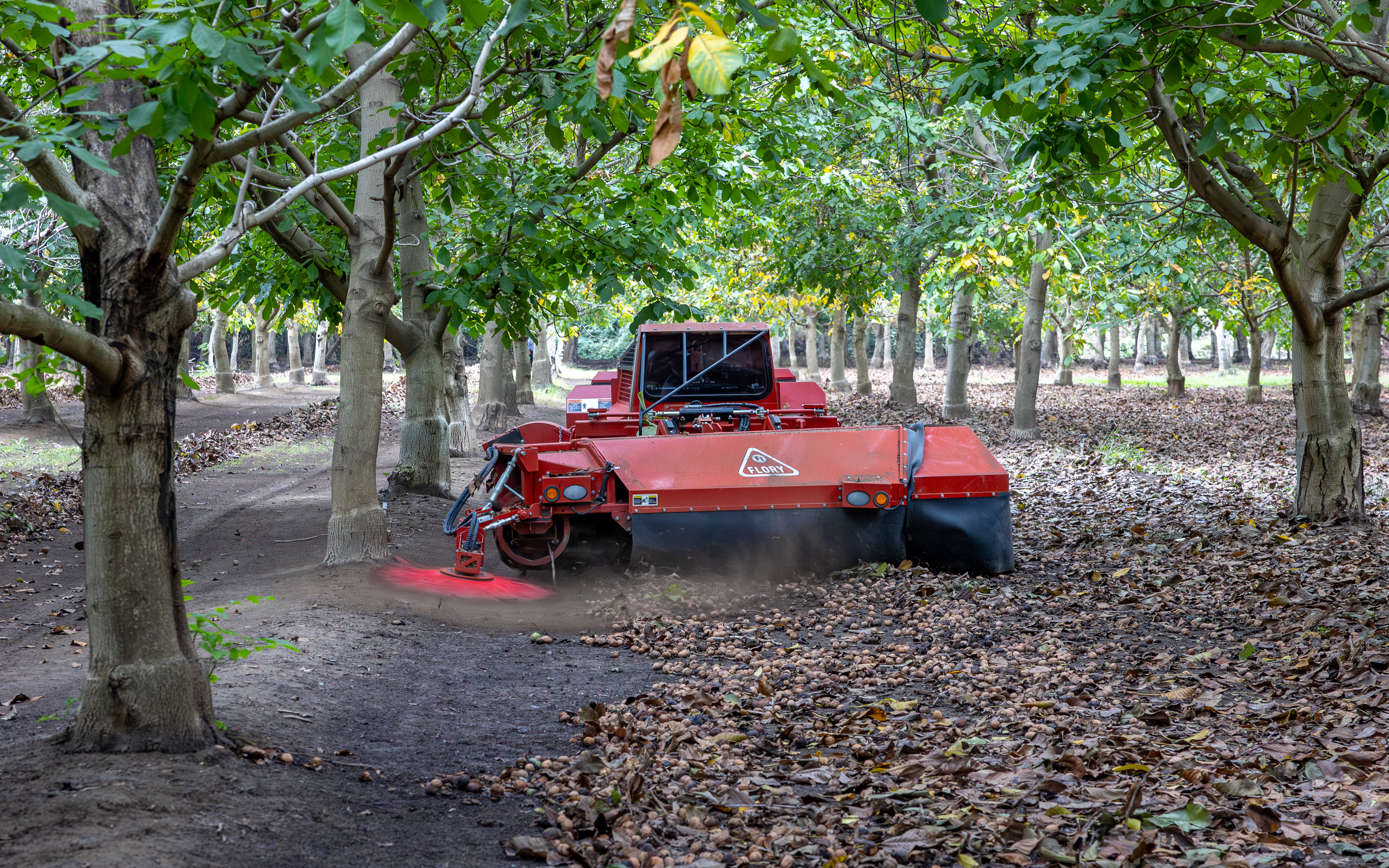
FLORY 34 Series Nut Sweeper during harvest in Glenn County, California

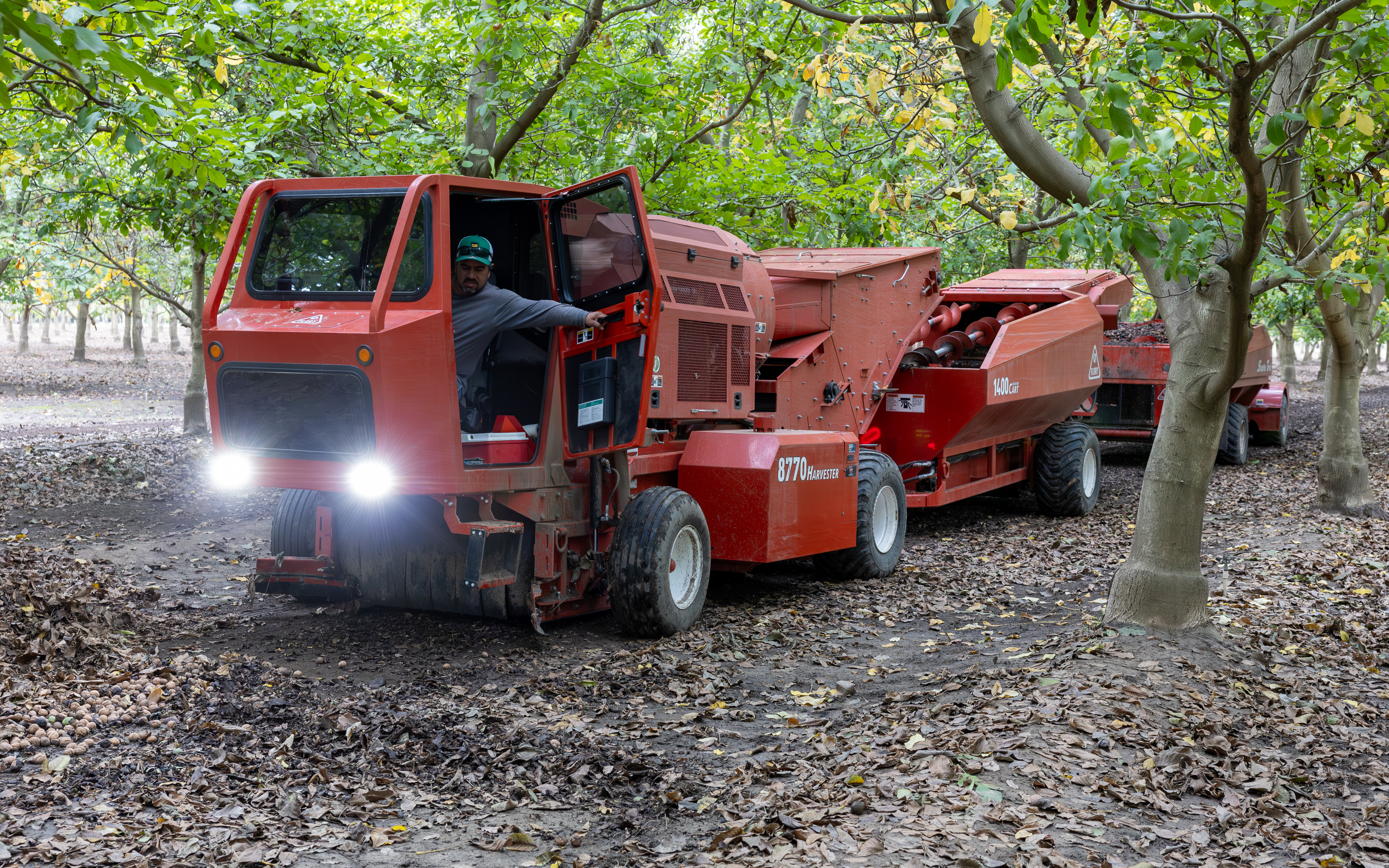
FLORY 8770 Harvester during walnut harvest in Glenn County

=== Cultivars ===
Walnut cultivars include:

- Purpurea
- Broadview
- Cascade
- Allegheny
- Bedco 1
- Coble #2
- Hansen
- Kaiser
- KY Giant
- Lake
- McKinster
- Somers
- Utah Giant
- Colby
- Greenhaven
- Reda
- Shiawassee
- Perry
- S-1
- Looking Glass
- China-B
- Champion
- Northern Prize
- Placentia
- Zijing

=== Pests ===
Particular cultivars of J. regia may be more infested by R. juglandis than others because of varying walnut husk softness or thickness. 'Eureka', 'Klondike', 'Payne', 'Franquette' and 'Ehrhardt' cultivars are among the most susceptible to infestation.

=== Production ===
In 2022, world production of shelled walnuts was 3.9 million tonnes, led by China with 36% of the total harvested, with the United States, Iran, and Turkey as secondary producers (table).

== Toxicity ==
=== Allergy ===
Walnuts and other tree nuts are food allergen sources having potential to cause life-threatening, IgE-mediated allergic reactions in some individuals.

== Uses ==
Unroasted walnuts
Nutritional value per 100 g (3.5 oz)
- Energy: 654 kcal (2,740 kJ)
- Carbohydrates: 13.7 g
- Sugars: 2.6
- Dietary fibre: 6.7 g
- Fat: 65.2 g
- Saturated: 6.1 g
- Monounsaturated: 8.9 g
- Polyunsaturated omega−3 omega−6: 47.2 g 9.1 g 38.1 g
- Protein: 15.2 g
Vitamins and minerals
| Vitamins | Quantity %DV^{†} |
| Thiamine (B1) | 28% 0.34 mg |
| Riboflavin (B2) | 12% 0.15 mg |
| Niacin (B3) | 7% 1.13 mg |
| Pantothenic acid (B5) | 11% 0.57 mg |
| Vitamin B6 | 32% 0.54 mg |
| Folate (B9) | 25% 98 μg |
| Choline | 7% 39.2 mg |
| Vitamin C | 1% 1 mg |
| Vitamin E | 5% 0.7 mg |
| Vitamin K | 2% 2.7 μg |
| Minerals | Quantity %DV^{†} |
| Calcium | 8% 98 mg |
| Copper | 178% 1.6 mg |
| Iron | 16% 2.9 mg |
| Magnesium | 38% 158 mg |
| Manganese | 148% 3.4 mg |
| Phosphorus | 28% 346 mg |
| Potassium | 15% 441 mg |
| Selenium | 9% 4.9 μg |
| Sodium | 0% 2 mg |
| Zinc | 28% 3.1 mg |
- Other constituents: Quantity
- Water: 4.1 g
- Link to USDA Database entry
- ^{†}Percentages estimated using US recommendations for adults, except for potassium, which is estimated based on expert recommendation from the National Academies.

=== Nutrition ===
Walnut kernels are 4% water, 65% fat, 15% protein, and 14% carbohydrates. In a reference amount of 100 g (3.5 oz) providing 654 calories, the kernels supply several micronutrients in rich amounts (20% or more of the Daily Value, DV), including the dietary minerals manganese, phosphorus, magnesium, zinc, and copper, among others; B vitamins B6, thiamine, and folate; and dietary fibre. The fatty acid composition includes 6% saturated fats, 10% monounsaturated fats, and 49% polyunsaturated fats (USDA source).

The sap can be processed into a sugar.

=== Wood ===
Walnut heartwood is a heavy, hard, open-grained hardwood. Freshly cut live wood may be Dijon-mustard colour, darkening to brown over a few days. The dried lumber is a rich chocolate-brown to black, with cream to tan sapwood, and may feature unusual patterns, such as "curly", "bee's wing", "bird's eye", and "rat tail", among others. It is prized by fine woodworkers for its durability, lustre and chatoyance, and is used for high-end flooring, guitars, furniture, veneers, knobs and handles as well as gunstocks.

=== Other uses ===
As with all species of walnut, the green outer husk of the fruit is rich in a yellow-brown to dark brown dye; harvesting the nuts often leaves the fingers strongly stained brown, and an extract from the husks can be used for dyeing cloth. The dye has notable antibacterial properties.

The bark and fruit rind can be used as a teeth cleaner, and the crushed leaves can be used an insect repellent.

== In culture ==
In Skopelos, a Greek island in the Aegean Sea, local legend suggests whoever plants a walnut tree will die as soon as the tree can "see" the sea. Most planting is done by field rats (subfamily Murinae). In Flanders, a folk saying states: "By the time the tree is big, the planter surely will be dead." (Dutch: Boompje groot, plantertje dood). These sayings refer to the relatively slow growth rate and late fruiting of the tree.

Benevento in southern Italy is the home of an ancient tradition of stregoneria. The witches of Benevento were reputed to come from all over Italy to gather for the Witches' Sabbath under the sacred walnut tree of Benevento. In 1526, Judge Paolo Grillandi wrote of witches in Benevento who worship a goddess at the site of an old walnut tree. This legend inspired many cultural works, including the 1812 ballet Il Noce di Benevento (the walnut tree of Benevento) by Salvatore Viganò and Franz Xaver Süssmayr, a theme from which was adapted into a violin piece called Le Streghe by Niccolò Paganini. The Beneventan liqueur Strega depicts on its label the famous walnut tree with the witches dancing under it.

=== Common names ===
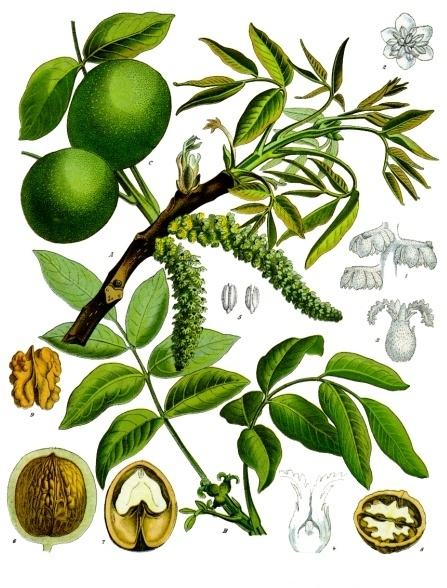
Illustration from Köhler's Medizinal Pflanzen

The Latin name for the walnut was nux Gallica, "Gallic nut"; the Gaulish region of Galatia in Anatolia lies in highlands at the western end of the tree's presumed natural distribution.

Although often called simply "walnut", this does not distinguish the tree from other species of Juglans. Internationally, it is most often called "common walnut" or "Persian walnut"; other names include "Madeira walnut", and "English walnut" mainly in North America, possibly because English sailors were prominent in Juglans regia nut distribution at one time. Alan Mitchell comments "The Americans call it 'English Walnut', which is plainly an error by the early settlers when finding the Black Walnut and Butternut growing in their woods, and 'Persian Walnut', which is correct", and Walter Fox Allen stated in his 1912 treatise What You Need to Know About Planting, Cultivating and Harvesting this Most Delicious of Nuts: "In America, it has commonly been known as English walnut to distinguish it from our native species", and occasionally elsewhere. The name "Carpathian walnut" refers to a cultivar group of selected cold-tolerant strains with high quality nuts, rather than the species as a whole.

In the Chinese language, the edible, cultivated walnut is called 胡桃 (hú táo in modern standard Chinese), which means literally "Hu peach", suggesting the ancient Chinese associated the introduction of the tree into East Asia with the Hu barbarians of the regions north and northwest of China. In Mexico, it is called nogal de Castilla, suggesting the Mexicans associated the introduction of the tree into Mexico with Spaniards from Castile (as opposed to the black walnuts native to North America).

The Old English term wealhhnutu is a late book-name (Old English Vocabularies, Wright & Wulker), so the remark that the Anglo-Saxons inherited the walnut tree from the Romans does not follow from this name. Old English: walhhnutu is wealh (foreign) + hnutu (nut). Etymologically it "meant the nut of the Roman lands (Gaul and Italy) as distinguished from the native hazel" according to the Oxford English Dictionary.

== See also ==
- Taxonomy of walnut species
