= List of moths of Chile (Tortricidae) =

This is a list of the moths of family Tortricidae which are found in Chile. It also acts as an index to the species articles and forms part of the full List of moths of Chile. Subfamilies are listed alphabetically.

== Subfamily Chlidanotinae ==
=== Tribe Polyorthini ===
- Lypothora fernaldi (Butler, 1883)
- Lypothora walsinghamii (Butler, 1883)

== Subfamily Olethreutinae ==
=== Tribe Eucosmini ===
- Crocidosema insulana Aurivillius, 1922
- Epinotia nigrovenata Razowski & Pelz, 2010
- Rhyacionia buoliana ([Denis & Schiffermüller], 1775)

=== Tribe Olethreutini ===
- Eccopsis galapagana Razowski & Landry, 2008
- Eccopsis razowskii Vargas, 2011

=== Tribe Grapholitini ===
- Cryptophlebia cortesi Clarke, 1986
- Cryptophlebia saileri Clarke, 1986
- Cydia pomonella (Linnaeus, 1775)

== Subfamily Tortricinae ==
=== Tribe Euliini ===
- Accuminulia buscki Brown, 2000
- Accuminulia longiphallus Brown, 2000
- Acmanthina acmanthes (Meyrick, 1931)
- Acmanthina albipuncta Brown, 2000
- Acmanthina molinana Razowski & Pelz, 2010
- Argentulia gentilii Brown, 1998
- Argentulia montana (Bartlett-Calvert, 1893)
- Chapoania dentigera Razowski, 1999
- Chileulia stalactitis (Meyrick, 1931)
- Chileulia yerbalocae Razowski & Pelz, 2010
- Chilips claduncus Razowski, 1988
- Eliachna chileana Razowski, 1999
- Eliachna digitana Brown & McPherson, 2002
- Eliachna hemicordata Brown & McPherson, 2002
- Exoletuncus artifex Razowski, 1997
- Haemateulia barrigana Razowski & González, 2003
- Haemateulia haematitis (Meyrick, 1931)
- Haemateulia placens Razowski & Pelz, 2010
- Nesochoris brachystigma Clarke, 1965
- Nesochoris holographa Clarke, 1965
- Phtheochroa inexacta Butler, 1883
- Proeulia aethalea Obraztsov, 1964
- Proeulia apospasta Obraztsov, 1964
- Proeulia approximata (Butler, 1883)
- Proeulia auraria (Clarke, 1949)
- Proeulia chancoana Razowski & Pelz, 2010
- Proeulia chromaffinis Razowski, 1995
- Proeulia chrysopteris (Butler, 1883)
- Proeulia clenchi Clarke, 1980
- Proeulia cneca Obraztsov, 1964
- Proeulia cnecona Razowski, 1995
- Proeulia domeykoi Razowski & Pelz, 2010
- Proeulia elguetae Razowski, 1999
- Proeulia exusta (Butler, 1883)
- Proeulia gielisi Razowski & Pelz, 2010
- Proeulia gladiator Razowski, 1999
- Proeulia griseiceps (Aurivillius, 1922)
- Proeulia guayacana Razowski, 1999
- Proeulia inconspicua Obraztsov, 1964
- Proeulia insperata Razowski, 1995
- Proeulia kuscheli Clarke, 1980
- Proeulia lentescens Razowski, 1995
- Proeulia leonina (Butler, 1883)
- Proeulia limaria Razowski & Pelz, 2010
- Proeulia longula Razowski & Pelz, 2010
- Proeulia macrobasana Razowski & Pelz, 2010
- Proeulia mauleana Razowski & Pelz, 2010
- Proeulia nubleana Razowski & González, 2003
- Proeulia onerata Razowski, 1995
- Proeulia paronerata Razowski & Pelz, 2010
- Proeulia robinsoni (Aurivillius, 1922)
- Proeulia rucapillana Razowski & Pelz, 2010
- Proeulia schouteni Razowski & Pelz, 2010
- Proeulia sublentescens Razowski & Pelz, 2010
- Proeulia talcana Razowski & Pelz, 2010
- Proeulia tenontias (Meyrick, 1912)
- Proeulia tricornuta Razowski & Pelz, 2010
- Proeulia triquetra Obraztsov, 1964
- Proeulia vanderwolfi Razowski & Pelz, 2010
- Ptychocroca apenicillia Brown & Razowski, 2003
- Ptychocroca crocoptycha (Meyrick, 1931)
- Ptychocroca galenia Razowski, 1999
- Ptychocroca keelioides Brown & Razowski, 2003
- Ptychocroca lineabasalis Brown & Razowski, 2003
- Ptychocroca nigropenicillia Brown & Razowski, 2003
- Ptychocroca simplex Brown & Razowski, 2003
- Ptychocroca wilkinsonii (Butler, 1883)
- Rebinea brunnea Razowski & Pelz, 2010
- Rebinea erebina (Butler, 1883)
- Recintona cnephasiodes Razowski, 1999
- Sericoris cauquenensis Butler, 1883
- Seticosta coquimbana Razowski & Pelz, 2010
- Silenis eurydice (Butler, 1883)
- Varifula fulvaria (Blanchard, 1852)
- Varifula trancasiana Razowski & Pelz, 2010
- Villarica villaricae Razowski & Pelz, 2010
