= Acmanthina =

Scientific classification
- Domain: Eukaryota
- Kingdom: Animalia
- Phylum: Arthropoda
- Class: Insecta
- Order: Lepidoptera
- Family: Tortricidae
- Tribe: Euliini
- Genus: Acmanthina; Brown, 2000

Species
- See text

Genus of tortrix moths

Acmanthina is a genus of moths belonging to the family Tortricidae and tribe Euliini. Within Euliini, it is part of the Bonagota group of closely related genera, alongside Apotomops, Bonagota, Haemateulia and Ptychocroca.

The name of the genus is derived from the specific epithet of its type species, Acmanthina acmanthes. (Note: as Peronea acmanthes, the name by which it was first described.)

== Species ==
- Acmanthina acmanthes (Meyrick, 1931)
- Acmanthina albipuncta Brown, 2000
- Acmanthina molinana Razowski & Pelz, 2010

== Notes and references ==
- Brown, John W., 2005, World Catalogue of Insects 5
- Razowski, J. & V. Pelz 2010: Tortricidae from Chile (Lepidoptera: Tortricidae). Shilap Revista de Lepidopterologia 38 (149): 5-55.
