= Argentulia =

Scientific classification
- Domain: Eukaryota
- Kingdom: Animalia
- Phylum: Arthropoda
- Class: Insecta
- Order: Lepidoptera
- Family: Tortricidae
- Tribe: Euliini
- Genus: Argentulia; Brown, 1998

Species
- See text

Genus of tortrix moths

Argentulia is a genus of moths belonging to the family Tortricidae. Members of the genus are unlike any other species in the tribe Euliini. Male and female genitalia suggest a close relationship to Varifula from Chile.

== Species ==
- Argentulia gentilii Brown, 1998
- Argentulia montana Bartlett-Calvert, 1893
