= Seticosta rubicola =

Scientific classification
- Domain: Eukaryota
- Kingdom: Animalia
- Phylum: Arthropoda
- Class: Insecta
- Order: Lepidoptera
- Family: Tortricidae
- Genus: Seticosta
- Species: S. rubicola

Binomial name
- Seticosta rubicola Brown & Nishida, 2003

Species of moth

Seticosta rubicola is a species of moth of the family Tortricidae. It is found in Costa Rica and Guatemala. Larvae have been intercepted on Rubus plants arriving in the United States from Guatemala.

The length of the forewings is 5-8.5 mm.

The larvae feed on Rubus species, including Rubus eriocarpus and Rubus vulcanicola.
