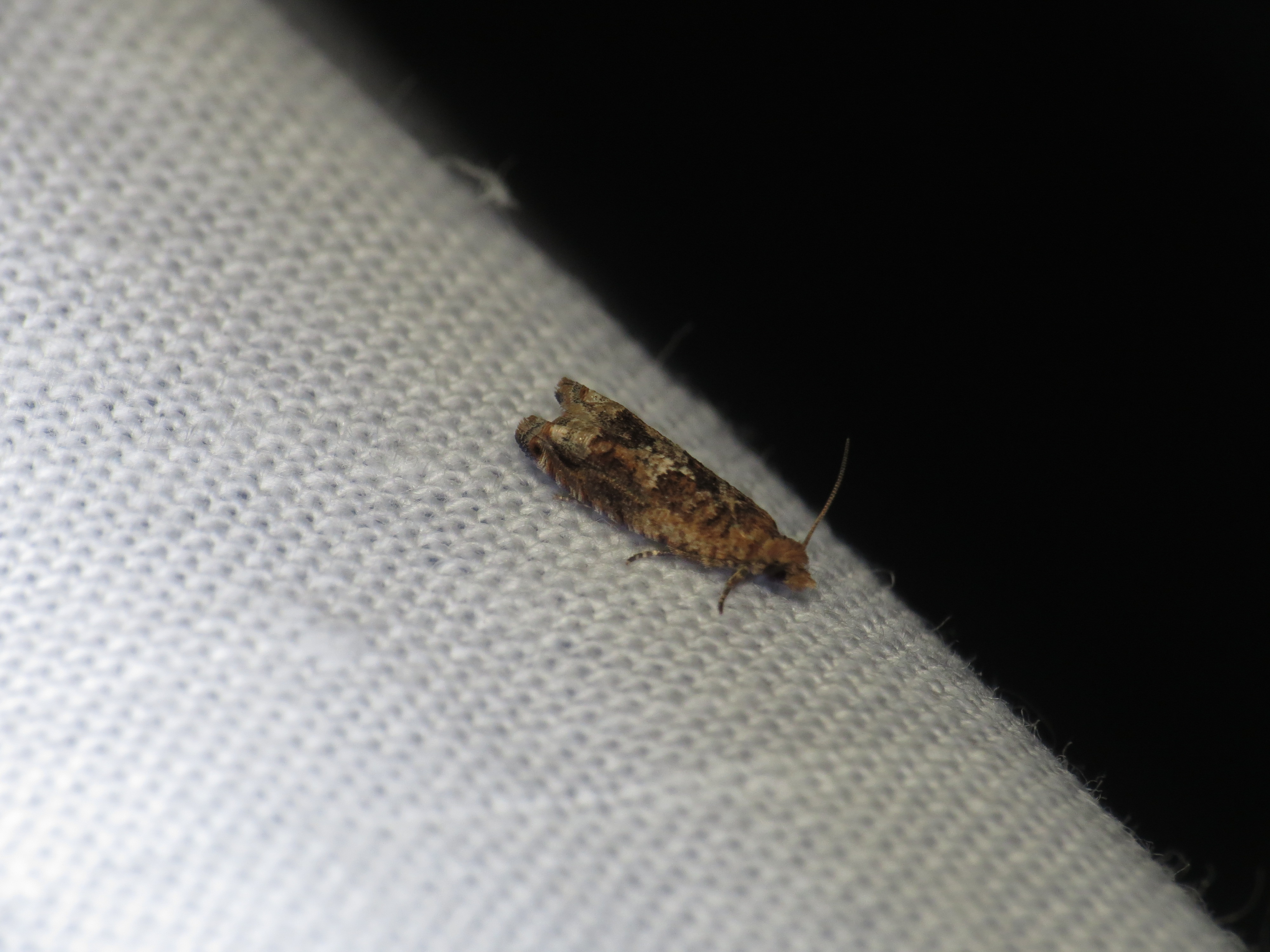

Scientific classification
- Kingdom: Animalia
- Phylum: Arthropoda
- Clade: Pancrustacea
- Class: Insecta
- Order: Lepidoptera
- Family: Tortricidae
- Genus: Crocidosema
- Species: C. lantana

Binomial name
- Crocidosema lantana Busck, 1910

Synonyms
- Epinotia lantana; Epinotia corynetes Diakonoff, 1982; Eucosma eridela Turner, 1946; Eucosma perversa Turner, 1946; Eucosma phaedropa Turner, 1946; Eucosma polyphaea Turner, 1926; Eucosma tornocosma Turner, 1946

= Crocidosema lantana =

Species of moth

Crocidosema lantana, the lantana flower-cluster moth or lantana tortricid moth, is a moth of the family Tortricidae. It was first described by August Busck in 1910. It is native to Mexico and the southern United States, but was introduced to Hawaii in 1902, Australia in 1914 and the Caroline Islands in 1948 and 1949 to aid in the control of Lantana weeds. It has also been recorded from Yunnan, China, Sri Lanka and from the African countries and islands of Madagascar, Mauritius, Kenya, Réunion and South Africa.

The larvae feed of Lantana camara (Verbenaceae).
