= Apotomops wellingtoniana =

Scientific classification
- Kingdom: Animalia
- Phylum: Arthropoda
- Clade: Pancrustacea
- Class: Insecta
- Order: Lepidoptera
- Family: Tortricidae
- Genus: Apotomops
- Species: A. wellingtoniana

Binomial name
- Apotomops wellingtoniana (Kearfott, 1907)

Synonyms
- Olethreutes wellingtoniana Kearfott, 1907; Apotomops wellingtonana Powell, 1986

Species of moth

Apotomops wellingtoniana is a species of moth of the family Tortricidae first described by William D. Kearfott in 1907. It is found in North America from British Columbia to Nova Scotia, south through the Rocky Mountains to the Mexican states of Durango, Nuevo Leon, Distrito Federal and Veracruz. In the east, it ranges south to the Great Smoky Mountains in Tennessee. The habitat consists of coniferous forests.

The wingspan is about 20 mm.

The larvae feed on Abies, Tsuga and Picea species. They are solitary defoliators.
