= Bonagota mexicana =

Scientific classification
- Kingdom: Animalia
- Phylum: Arthropoda
- Clade: Pancrustacea
- Class: Insecta
- Order: Lepidoptera
- Family: Tortricidae
- Genus: Bonagota
- Species: B. mexicana

Binomial name
- Bonagota mexicana Razowski & Becker, 2000

Species of moth

Bonagota mexicana is a species of moth of the family Tortricidae. It is found in Mexico's Federal District.
