= Bonagota piosana =

Scientific classification
- Domain: Eukaryota
- Kingdom: Animalia
- Phylum: Arthropoda
- Class: Insecta
- Order: Lepidoptera
- Family: Tortricidae
- Genus: Bonagota
- Species: B. piosana

Binomial name
- Bonagota piosana Razowski & Wojtusiak, 2006

Species of moth

Bonagota piosana is a species of moth of the family Tortricidae. It is known from Venezuela.

The wingspan is 16 millimetres (0.63 in) (holotype, male).

== Etymology ==
The species name refers to the type-locality, Quebrada de los Píos.
