= Seticosta =

Scientific classification
- Kingdom: Animalia
- Phylum: Arthropoda
- Clade: Pancrustacea
- Class: Insecta
- Order: Lepidoptera
- Family: Tortricidae
- Tribe: Euliini
- Genus: Seticosta; Razowski, 1986

Species
- See text

Genus of tortrix moths

Seticosta is a genus of moths belonging to the family Tortricidae.

== Species ==
- Seticosta aeolozona Meyrick, 1926
- Seticosta albicentra Razowski & Wojtusiak, 2009
- Seticosta arachnogramma Meyrick, 1926
- Seticosta argentichroa Razowski & Pelz, 2004
- Seticosta ariadnae Razowski & Pelz, 2004
- Seticosta cerussograpta Razowski, 1999
- Seticosta charagma Razowski & Becker, 1999
- Seticosta chlorothicta Razowski & Pelz, 2004
- Seticosta cigcligrapha Razowski & Pelz, 2004
- Seticosta concava Razowski & Wojtusiak, 2009
- Seticosta constricta Razowski & Wojtusiak, 2010
- Seticosta coquimbana Razowski & Pelz, 2010
- Seticosta droserana Razowski & Wojtusiak, 2009
- Seticosta egregia Razowski & Pelz, 2004
- Seticosta elbaho Razowski & Wojtusiak, 2013
- Seticosta homosacta Meyrick, 1930
- Seticosta marcapatae Razowski & Wojtusiak, 2010
- Seticosta multifidana Zeller, 1877
- Seticosta niveonigra Razowski & Wojtusiak, 2006
- Seticosta paranica Razowski & Becker, 1999
- Seticosta phrixotricha Razowski & Pelz, 2004
- Seticosta punctum Razowski & Becker, 1999
- Seticosta retearia Razowski & Pelz, 2004
- Seticosta rubicola Brown & Nishida, 2003
- Seticosta sagmatica Meyrick, 1912
- Seticosta senecta Razowski & Becker, 1999
- Seticosta subariadnae Razowski & Wojtusiak, 2009
- Seticosta szeptyckii Razowski & Wojtusiak, 2009
- Seticosta tambomachaya Razowski, 1988
- Seticosta tholeraula Meyrick, 1912
- Seticosta tinga Razowski & Wojtusiak, 2010
- Seticosta transtillana Razowski & Wojtusiak, 2010
- Seticosta triangulifera Razowski & Pelz, 2004
- Seticosta tridens Razowski, 1988
- Seticosta versabilis Meyrick, 1926

== Status unknown ==
- Seticosta mirana (Felder & Rogenhofer, 1875)
