= Bonagota dominicana =

Scientific classification
- Domain: Eukaryota
- Kingdom: Animalia
- Phylum: Arthropoda
- Class: Insecta
- Order: Lepidoptera
- Family: Tortricidae
- Genus: Bonagota
- Species: B. dominicana

Binomial name
- Bonagota dominicana Razowski, 1999

Species of moth

Bonagota dominicana is a species of moth of the family Tortricidae. It is found in the Dominican Republic.
