= Lypothora =

Scientific classification
- Domain: Eukaryota
- Kingdom: Animalia
- Phylum: Arthropoda
- Class: Insecta
- Order: Lepidoptera
- Family: Tortricidae
- Tribe: Polyorthini
- Genus: Lypothora; Razowski, 1981

Species
- See text

Genus of tortrix moths

Lypothora is a genus of moths belonging to the family Tortricidae.

== Species ==
- Lypothora fernaldii Butler, 1883
- Lypothora roseochraon Razowski & Wojtusiak, 2010
- Lypothora walsinghamii Butler, 1883
