= Bonagota arizonae =

Scientific classification
- Kingdom: Animalia
- Phylum: Arthropoda
- Clade: Pancrustacea
- Class: Insecta
- Order: Lepidoptera
- Family: Tortricidae
- Genus: Bonagota
- Species: B. arizonae

Binomial name
- Bonagota arizonae Razowski & Becker, 2000

Species of moth

Bonagota arizonae is a species of moth of the family Tortricidae. It is found in the United States in Arizona where it was found in the Huachuca Mountains.
