= Bonagota costaricana =

Scientific classification
- Kingdom: Animalia
- Phylum: Arthropoda
- Clade: Pancrustacea
- Class: Insecta
- Order: Lepidoptera
- Family: Tortricidae
- Genus: Bonagota
- Species: B. costaricana

Binomial name
- Bonagota costaricana Razowski & Becker, 2000

Species of moth

Bonagota costaricana is a species of moth of the family Tortricidae. It is found in Costa Rica.
