= Lypothora roseochraon =

Scientific classification
- Kingdom: Animalia
- Phylum: Arthropoda
- Class: Insecta
- Order: Lepidoptera
- Family: Tortricidae
- Genus: Lypothora
- Species: L. roseochraon

Binomial name
- Lypothora roseochraon Razowski & Wojtusiak, 2010

Species of moth

Lypothora roseochraon is a species of moth of the family Tortricidae. It is found in Ecuador.

The wingspan is about 28 mm.
