= Chapoania =

Scientific classification
- Kingdom: Animalia
- Phylum: Arthropoda
- Class: Insecta
- Order: Lepidoptera
- Family: Tortricidae
- Tribe: Euliini
- Genus: Chapoania; Razowski, 1999

Species
- See text

Genus of tortrix moths

Chapoania is a genus of moths belonging to the family Tortricidae.

== Species ==
- Chapoania dentigera Razowski, 1999
