= Bonagota moronaecola =

Scientific classification
- Kingdom: Animalia
- Phylum: Arthropoda
- Class: Insecta
- Order: Lepidoptera
- Family: Tortricidae
- Genus: Bonagota
- Species: B. moronaecola

Binomial name
- Bonagota moronaecola Razowski & Wojtusiak, 2006

Species of moth

Bonagota moronaecola is a moth of the family Tortricidae. It is endemic to Ecuador. The specific epithet refers to Morona-Santiago Province, where the type locality is situated; the suffix –colo is Latin for "I live". The wingspan is about 23 millimetres (0.91 in) for females.
