= Apotomops carchicola =

Scientific classification
- Kingdom: Animalia
- Phylum: Arthropoda
- Clade: Pancrustacea
- Class: Insecta
- Order: Lepidoptera
- Family: Tortricidae
- Genus: Apotomops
- Species: A. carchicola

Binomial name
- Apotomops carchicola (Razowski & Becker, 2000)

Synonyms
- Bonagota carchicola Razowski & Becker, 2000

Species of moth

Apotomops carchicola is a species of moth of the family Tortricidae. It is found in Carchi Province, Ecuador.
