= Seticosta elbaho =

Scientific classification
- Domain: Eukaryota
- Kingdom: Animalia
- Phylum: Arthropoda
- Class: Insecta
- Order: Lepidoptera
- Family: Tortricidae
- Genus: Seticosta
- Species: S. elbaho

Binomial name
- Seticosta elbaho Razowski & Wojtusiak, 2013

Species of moth

Seticosta elbaho is a species of moth of the family Tortricidae. It is found in Venezuela.

The wingspan is 33 mm.

== Etymology ==
The species name refers to the type locality, El Baho in Venezuela.
