= Seticosta transtillana =

Scientific classification
- Domain: Eukaryota
- Kingdom: Animalia
- Phylum: Arthropoda
- Class: Insecta
- Order: Lepidoptera
- Family: Tortricidae
- Genus: Seticosta
- Species: S. transtillana

Binomial name
- Seticosta transtillana Razowski & Wojtusiak, 2010

Species of moth

Seticosta transtillana is a species of moth of the family Tortricidae. It is found in Peru.

The wingspan is 18 mm.
