= Crocidosema marcidellum =

Scientific classification
- Kingdom: Animalia
- Phylum: Arthropoda
- Class: Insecta
- Order: Lepidoptera
- Family: Tortricidae
- Genus: Crocidosema
- Species: C. marcidellum

Binomial name
- Crocidosema marcidellum (Walsingham in Sharp, 1907)

Synonyms
- Adenoneura marcidellum Walsingham, 1907; Crocidosema marcidella – Zimmerman, 1978

Species of moth

Crocidosema marcidellum is a moth of the family Tortricidae. It was described by Lord Walsingham in 1907. It is (probably) endemic to the Hawaiian islands, with records from the mountains of Kauai and Oahu.

The wingspan is 15–20 mm (0.59–0.79 in). The larvae feed on Hibiscus arnottianus (fruit) and Abutilon sandwicense (petioles). The pupa is about 7 mm long and yellowish brown.
