= Accuminulia =

Scientific classification
- Kingdom: Animalia
- Phylum: Arthropoda
- Class: Insecta
- Order: Lepidoptera
- Family: Tortricidae
- Tribe: Cochylini
- Genus: Accuminulia; Brown, 1999

Synonyms
- Accumineulia Razowski, 1999

Genus of tortrix moths

Accuminulia is a small genus of tortrix moths belonging to the tortricine tribe Cochylini. The genus was first described by John W. Brown in 1999, and consists of two species, both of which are known from Chile.

== Species ==
As of November 2019, the Online World Catalogue of the Tortricidae listed the following species:

- Accuminulia buscki Brown, 2000
- Accuminulia longiphallus Brown, 1999
