= Seticosta niveonigra =

Scientific classification
- Domain: Eukaryota
- Kingdom: Animalia
- Phylum: Arthropoda
- Class: Insecta
- Order: Lepidoptera
- Family: Tortricidae
- Genus: Seticosta
- Species: S. niveonigra

Binomial name
- Seticosta niveonigra Razowski & Wojtusiak, 2006

Species of moth

Seticosta niveonigra is a species of moth of the family Tortricidae. It is found in Venezuela.

The wingspan is 20 mm.
