= Seticosta subariadnae =

Scientific classification
- Domain: Eukaryota
- Kingdom: Animalia
- Phylum: Arthropoda
- Class: Insecta
- Order: Lepidoptera
- Family: Tortricidae
- Genus: Seticosta
- Species: S. subariadnae

Binomial name
- Seticosta subariadnae Razowski & Wojtusiak, 2009

Species of moth

Seticosta subariadnae is a species of moth of the family Tortricidae. It is found in Napo Province, Ecuador.

The wingspan is 28 mm.
