= Seticosta triangulifera =

Scientific classification
- Kingdom: Animalia
- Phylum: Arthropoda
- Class: Insecta
- Order: Lepidoptera
- Family: Tortricidae
- Genus: Seticosta
- Species: S. triangulifera

Binomial name
- Seticosta triangulifera Razowski & Pelz, 2004

Species of moth

Seticosta triangulifera is a species of moth of the family Tortricidae. It is found in Tungurahua Province, Ecuador.

The wingspan is 16 mm.
