= Seticosta cigcligrapha =

Scientific classification
- Kingdom: Animalia
- Phylum: Arthropoda
- Class: Insecta
- Order: Lepidoptera
- Family: Tortricidae
- Genus: Seticosta
- Species: S. cigcligrapha

Binomial name
- Seticosta cigcligrapha Razowski & Pelz, 2004

Species of moth

Seticosta cigcligrapha is a species of moth of the family Tortricidae. It is found in Napo Province, Ecuador.

The wingspan is 26 mm.
