= Apotomops boliviana =

Scientific classification
- Domain: Eukaryota
- Kingdom: Animalia
- Phylum: Arthropoda
- Class: Insecta
- Order: Lepidoptera
- Family: Tortricidae
- Genus: Apotomops
- Species: A. boliviana

Binomial name
- Apotomops boliviana Brown & Razowski, 2003

Species of moth

Apotomops boliviana is a species of moth of the family Tortricidae that is endemic to Bolivia.

The length of the forewings is about 7.5 millimetres (0.30 in) for males and 11 mm for females.

== Etymology ==
The species name refers the country of Bolivia, where the species is found.
