= Proeulia sublentescens =

Scientific classification
- Kingdom: Animalia
- Phylum: Arthropoda
- Class: Insecta
- Order: Lepidoptera
- Family: Tortricidae
- Genus: Proeulia
- Species: P. sublentescens

Binomial name
- Proeulia sublentescens Razowski & Pelz, 2010

Species of moth

Proeulia sublentescens is a species of moth of the family Tortricidae. It is found in Chile in Araucanía Region and Malleco Province.

The wingspan is 19.5 mm.

== Etymology ==
The species name refers to the close relationship to Proeulia lentescens and is derived from Latin sub (meaning under).
