= Rebinea =

Scientific classification
- Domain: Eukaryota
- Kingdom: Animalia
- Phylum: Arthropoda
- Class: Insecta
- Order: Lepidoptera
- Family: Tortricidae
- Tribe: Euliini
- Genus: Rebinea; Razowski, 1986

Species
- See text

Genus of tortrix moths

Rebinea is a genus of moths belonging to the family Tortricidae. It was described by Józef Razowski in 1986.

== Species ==
There are two recognized species:

- Rebinea brunnea Razowski & Pelz, 2010
- Rebinea erebina (Butler, 1883)
