= Seticosta homosacta =

Scientific classification
- Kingdom: Animalia
- Phylum: Arthropoda
- Class: Insecta
- Order: Lepidoptera
- Family: Tortricidae
- Genus: Seticosta
- Species: S. homosacta

Binomial name
- Seticosta homosacta (Meyrick, 1930)

Synonyms
- Eulia homosacta Meyrick, 1930

Species of moth

Seticosta homosacta is a species of moth of the family Tortricidae. It is found in Ecuador and Peru.
