= Seticosta szeptyckii =

Scientific classification
- Domain: Eukaryota
- Kingdom: Animalia
- Phylum: Arthropoda
- Class: Insecta
- Order: Lepidoptera
- Family: Tortricidae
- Genus: Seticosta
- Species: S. szeptyckii

Binomial name
- Seticosta szeptyckii Razowski & Wojtusiak, 2009

Species of moth

Seticosta szeptyckii is a species of moth of the family Tortricidae. It is found in Ecuador in Cotopaxi and Napo provinces.

The wingspan is 24 mm for males and 27 mm for females.
