= Proeulia paronerata =

Scientific classification
- Kingdom: Animalia
- Phylum: Arthropoda
- Class: Insecta
- Order: Lepidoptera
- Family: Tortricidae
- Genus: Proeulia
- Species: P. paronerata

Binomial name
- Proeulia paronerata Razowski & Pelz, 2010

Species of moth

Proeulia paronerata is a species of moth of the family Tortricidae. It is found in the Valparaíso Region of Chile.

The wingspan is 19–21 mm.

== Etymology ==
The species name refers to the similarity with Proeulia onerata, plus the Greek prefix par (meaning near).
