= Seticosta argentichroa =

Scientific classification
- Kingdom: Animalia
- Phylum: Arthropoda
- Class: Insecta
- Order: Lepidoptera
- Family: Tortricidae
- Genus: Seticosta
- Species: S. argentichroa

Binomial name
- Seticosta argentichroa Razowski & Pelz, 2004

Species of moth

Seticosta argentichroa is a species of moth of the family Tortricidae. It is found in Ecuador in the provinces of Loja and Azuay.

The wingspan is 17–18 mm.
