= Eliachna =

Scientific classification
- Domain: Eukaryota
- Kingdom: Animalia
- Phylum: Arthropoda
- Class: Insecta
- Order: Lepidoptera
- Family: Tortricidae
- Tribe: Euliini
- Genus: Eliachna; Razowski, 1999

Species
- See text

Genus of tortrix moths

Eliachna is a genus of moths belonging to the family Tortricidae.

== Species ==
- Eliachna chileana Razowski, 1999
- Eliachna digitana Brown & McPherson, 2002
- Eliachna hemicordata Brown & McPherson, 2002
