= Seticosta mirana =

Scientific classification
- Domain: Eukaryota
- Kingdom: Animalia
- Phylum: Arthropoda
- Class: Insecta
- Order: Lepidoptera
- Family: Tortricidae
- Genus: Seticosta
- Species: S. mirana

Binomial name
- Seticosta mirana (Felder & Rogenhofer, 1875)

Synonyms
- Tortrix mirana Felder & Rogenhofer, 1875

Species of moth

Seticosta mirana is a species of moth of the family Tortricidae. It was described from Venezuela, but the current status of the species is unclear.
