= Seticosta tambomachaya =

Scientific classification
- Kingdom: Animalia
- Phylum: Arthropoda
- Class: Insecta
- Order: Lepidoptera
- Family: Tortricidae
- Genus: Seticosta
- Species: S. tambomachaya

Binomial name
- Seticosta tambomachaya Razowski, 1988

Species of moth

Seticosta tambomachaya is a species of moth of the family Tortricidae.

== Distribution ==
It is found in Peru.
