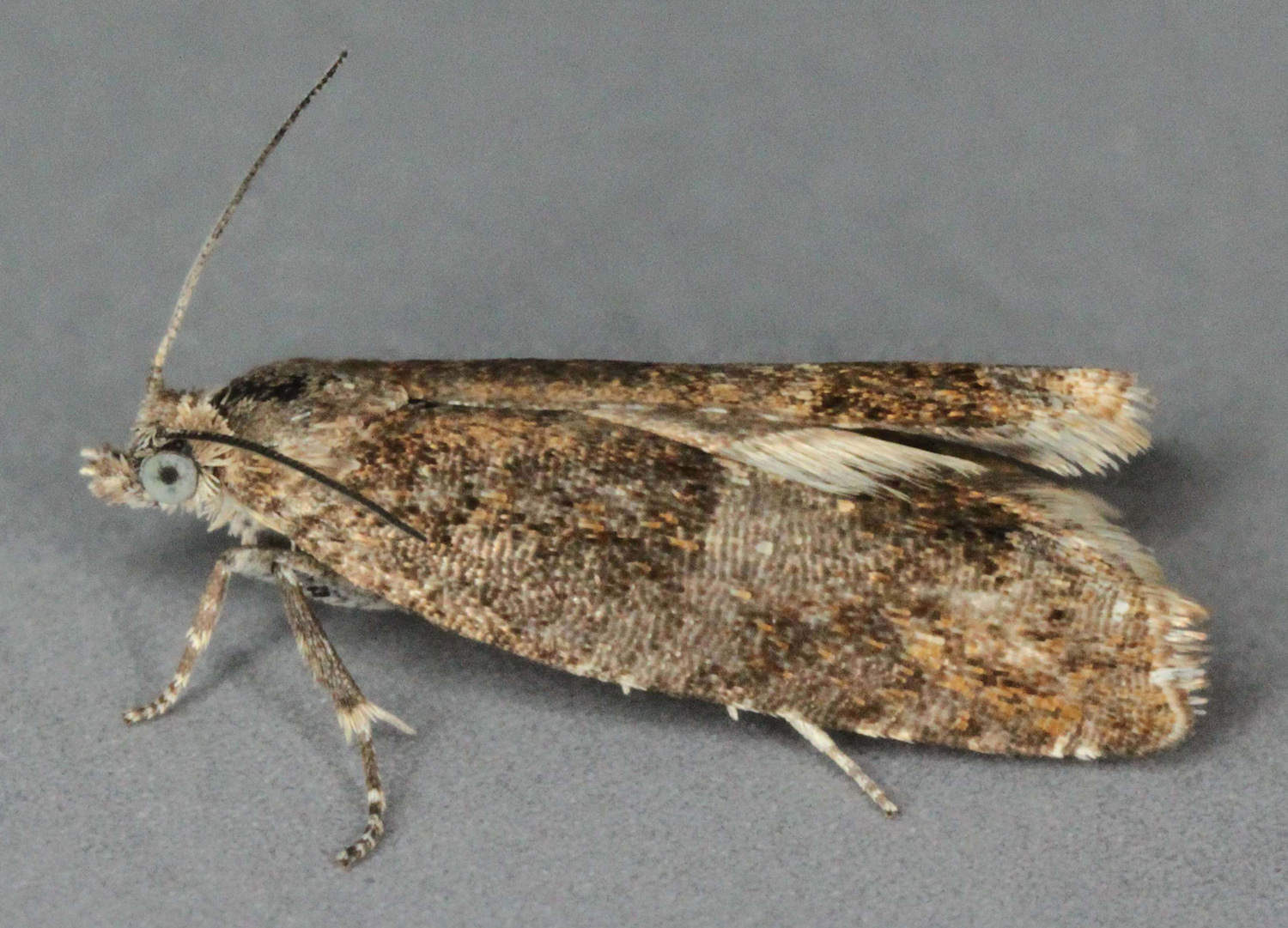
- Epinotia signatana, Trawscoed, North Wales

Scientific classification
- Kingdom: Animalia
- Phylum: Arthropoda
- Class: Insecta
- Order: Lepidoptera
- Family: Tortricidae
- Genus: Epinotia
- Species: E. signatana

Binomial name
- Epinotia signatana (Douglas, 1845)

Synonyms
- Steganoptycha signatana Douglas, 1845; Sericoris signatana Douglas, 1845; Grapholitha kroesmanniana Heinemann, 1863; Grapholitha padana Lienig & Zeller, 1846; Sericoris signata Caradja, 1903

= Epinotia signatana =

Species of moth

Epinotia signatana is a moth of the family Tortricidae. It is found from England and Scandinavia to the Mediterranean Sea, to eastern Russia, China (Jilin, Shaanxi), Korea, Burma and Japan.

The wingspan is 14–16 mm. The forewings are yellow-whitish striated with fuscous. The costa is strigulated with dark fuscous. The edge of the basal patch is angulated in the middle. An irregular central fascia, and the apical area are fuscous irrorated with pale yellowish, with a few blackish marks. A slender blackish longitudinal streak crosses the middle of the fascia and curves upwards above the ocellus to near termen. The ocellus is pale yellowish, edged with leaden-metallic. The hindwings are grey or light grey.

Adults are on wing in June and July.

The larvae feed on Prunus spinosa, Prunus avium and Prunus padus. It has also been recorded from Prunus cerasus, Crataegus and Malus sylvestris. Larvae feed in a folded leaf or a spun shoot of the host plant.

The synonym Steganoptycha signatana as incorrectly used by Walsingham, refers to Crocidosema plebejana.
