= Apotomops spomotopa =

Scientific classification
- Kingdom: Animalia
- Phylum: Arthropoda
- Class: Insecta
- Order: Lepidoptera
- Family: Tortricidae
- Genus: Apotomops
- Species: A. spomotopa

Binomial name
- Apotomops spomotopa Brown & Razowski, 2003

Species of moth

Apotomops spomotopa is a species of moth of the family Tortricidae that is endemic to Peru.

The length of the forewings is about 7.5 millimetres (0.30 in) for males and about 10 millimetres (0.39 in) for females.

== Etymology ==
The species name is the genus name spelled backwards, creating a palindrome.
