= Seticosta marcapatae =

Scientific classification
- Domain: Eukaryota
- Kingdom: Animalia
- Phylum: Arthropoda
- Class: Insecta
- Order: Lepidoptera
- Family: Tortricidae
- Genus: Seticosta
- Species: S. marcapatae

Binomial name
- Seticosta marcapatae Razowski & Wojtusiak, 2010

Species of moth

Seticosta marcapatae is a species of moth of the family Tortricidae. It is found in Peru and Bolivia.

The wingspan is 17 mm.

== Etymology ==
The species name refers to the type locality.
