= Seticosta sagmatica =

Scientific classification
- Kingdom: Animalia
- Phylum: Arthropoda
- Class: Insecta
- Order: Lepidoptera
- Family: Tortricidae
- Genus: Seticosta
- Species: S. sagmatica

Binomial name
- Seticosta sagmatica (Meyrick, 1912)

Synonyms
- Eulia sagmatica Meyrick, 1912

Species of moth

Seticosta sagmatica is a species of moth of the family Tortricidae. It is found in Colombia.
