= Nesochoris =

Scientific classification
- Domain: Eukaryota
- Kingdom: Animalia
- Phylum: Arthropoda
- Class: Insecta
- Order: Lepidoptera
- Family: Tortricidae
- Tribe: Euliini
- Genus: Nesochoris; Clarke, 1965

Species
- See text

Genus of tortrix moths

Nesochoris is a genus of moths belonging to the family Tortricidae.

== Species ==
- Nesochoris brachystigma Clarke, 1965
- Nesochoris holographa Clarke, 1965
