= Seticosta albicentra =

Scientific classification
- Domain: Eukaryota
- Kingdom: Animalia
- Phylum: Arthropoda
- Class: Insecta
- Order: Lepidoptera
- Family: Tortricidae
- Genus: Seticosta
- Species: S. albicentra

Binomial name
- Seticosta albicentra Razowski & Wojtusiak, 2009

Species of moth

Seticosta albicentra is a species of moth of the family Tortricidae. It is found in Morona-Santiago Province, Ecuador.

The wingspan is 25 mm for females and 22 mm for males.
