= Bonagota melanecta =

Scientific classification
- Domain: Eukaryota
- Kingdom: Animalia
- Phylum: Arthropoda
- Class: Insecta
- Order: Lepidoptera
- Family: Tortricidae
- Genus: Bonagota
- Species: B. melanecta

Binomial name
- Bonagota melanecta (Meyrick, 1917)

Synonyms
- Eulia melanecta Meyrick, 1917

Species of moth

Bonagota melanecta is a species of moth of the family Tortricidae. It is found in Chimborazo Province, Ecuador.
