= Seticosta tridens =

Scientific classification
- Kingdom: Animalia
- Phylum: Arthropoda
- Class: Insecta
- Order: Lepidoptera
- Family: Tortricidae
- Genus: Seticosta
- Species: S. tridens

Binomial name
- Seticosta tridens Razowski, 1988

Species of moth

Seticosta tridens is a species of moth of the family Tortricidae. It is found in Colombia.
