= Seticosta tholeraula =

Scientific classification
- Kingdom: Animalia
- Phylum: Arthropoda
- Class: Insecta
- Order: Lepidoptera
- Family: Tortricidae
- Genus: Seticosta
- Species: S. tholeraula

Binomial name
- Seticosta tholeraula (Meyrick, 1912)

Synonyms
- Eulia tholeraula Meyrick, 1912

Species of moth

Seticosta tholeraula is a species of moth of the family Tortricidae. It is found in Argentina.
