= Bonagota salubricola =

Brazilian apple leafroller

Scientific classification
- Kingdom: Animalia
- Phylum: Arthropoda
- Class: Insecta
- Order: Lepidoptera
- Family: Tortricidae
- Genus: Bonagota
- Species: B. salubricola

Binomial name
- Bonagota salubricola (Meyrick, 1931)

Synonyms
- Eulia salubricola Meyrick, 1931; Phtheochroa cranaodes Meyrick, 1937

Species of moth

Bonagota salubricola, the Brazilian apple leafroller, is a species of moth of the family Tortricidae. It is found in Argentina, Brazil, Paraguay and Uruguay.

The length of the forewings is 11–14 mm.

The larvae feed on various plants, including Malus species. They roll the leaves of their host plant, and are considered an important pest.
