= Seticosta phrixotricha =

Scientific classification
- Kingdom: Animalia
- Phylum: Arthropoda
- Class: Insecta
- Order: Lepidoptera
- Family: Tortricidae
- Genus: Seticosta
- Species: S. phrixotricha

Binomial name
- Seticosta phrixotricha Razowski & Pelz, 2004

Species of moth

Seticosta phrixotricha is a species of moth of the family Tortricidae. It is found in Peru, Brazil (Paraná), Ecuador (Loja Province) and Bolivia.

The wingspan is 23.5 mm.
