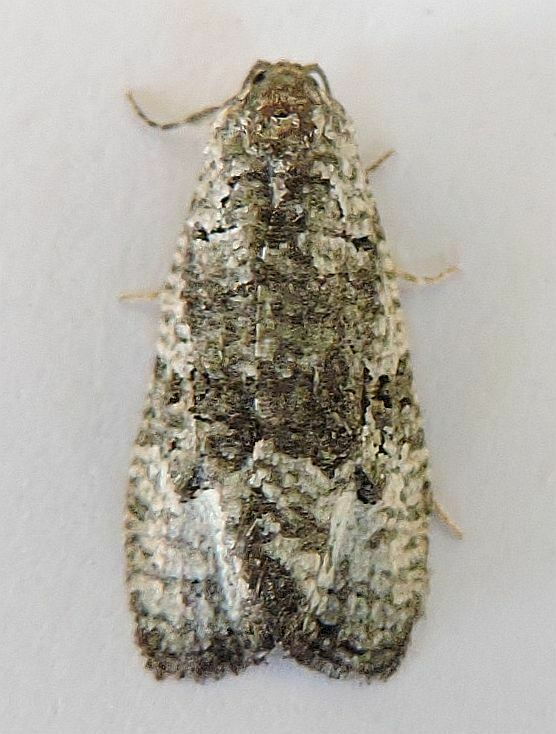

Scientific classification
- Kingdom: Animalia
- Phylum: Arthropoda
- Class: Insecta
- Order: Lepidoptera
- Family: Tortricidae
- Genus: Apotomops
- Species: A. texasana

Binomial name
- Apotomops texasana (Blanchard & Knudson, 1984)

Synonyms
- Anopina texasana Blanchard & Knudson, 1984

= Apotomops texasana =

Species of moth of the family Tortricidae from Arizona and Texas in the United States

Apotomops texasana is a species of moth of the family Tortricidae. It is found in Arizona and Texas in the United States.

The wingspan is about 15 mm.
