= Recintona =

Scientific classification
- Kingdom: Animalia
- Phylum: Arthropoda
- Class: Insecta
- Order: Lepidoptera
- Family: Tortricidae
- Tribe: Euliini
- Genus: Recintona; Razowski, 1999

Species
- See text

Genus of tortrix moths

Recintona is a genus of moths belonging to the family Tortricidae.

== Species ==
- Recintona cnephasiodes Razowski, 1999

== Bibliography ==
- Razowski, J., 1999: Euliini (Lepidoptera: Tortricidae) of Chile. Polskie Pismo Entomologiczne, Bulletin Entomologique Pologne 68: 69–90.
