= Seticosta cerussograpta =

Scientific classification
- Kingdom: Animalia
- Phylum: Arthropoda
- Class: Insecta
- Order: Lepidoptera
- Family: Tortricidae
- Genus: Seticosta
- Species: S. cerussograpta

Binomial name
- Seticosta cerussograpta Razowski, 1999

Species of moth

Seticosta cerussograpta is a species of moth of the family Tortricidae. It is found in Morona-Santiago Province, Ecuador.
