= Bonagota bogotana =

Scientific classification
- Kingdom: Animalia
- Phylum: Arthropoda
- Class: Insecta
- Order: Lepidoptera
- Family: Tortricidae
- Genus: Bonagota
- Species: B. bogotana

Binomial name
- Bonagota bogotana (Walker, 1863)

Synonyms
- Sciaphila bogotana Walker, 1863; Cryptolechia penthinella Zeller, 1877

Species of moth

Bonagota bogotana is a species of moth of the family Tortricidae. It is found in Colombia.
