= Seticosta multifidana =

Scientific classification
- Kingdom: Animalia
- Phylum: Arthropoda
- Clade: Pancrustacea
- Class: Insecta
- Order: Lepidoptera
- Family: Tortricidae
- Genus: Seticosta
- Species: S. multifidana

Binomial name
- Seticosta multifidana (Zeller, 1877)

Synonyms
- Teras multifidana Zeller, 1877

Species of moth

Seticosta multifidana is a species of moth of the family Tortricidae. It is found in Colombia.
