= Seticosta chlorothicta =

Scientific classification
- Kingdom: Animalia
- Phylum: Arthropoda
- Class: Insecta
- Order: Lepidoptera
- Family: Tortricidae
- Genus: Seticosta
- Species: S. chlorothicta

Binomial name
- Seticosta chlorothicta Razowski & Pelz, 2004

Species of moth

Seticosta chlorothicta is a species of moth of the family Tortricidae. It is found in Ecuador in Napo, Tungurahua, Morona-Santiago and Loja provinces.

Its wingspan is 17 mm.
