= Seticosta tinga =

Scientific classification
- Domain: Eukaryota
- Kingdom: Animalia
- Phylum: Arthropoda
- Class: Insecta
- Order: Lepidoptera
- Family: Tortricidae
- Genus: Seticosta
- Species: S. tinga

Binomial name
- Seticosta tinga Razowski & Wojtusiak, 2010

Species of moth

Seticosta tinga is a species of moth of the family Tortricidae. It is found in Peru.

The wingspan is 25 mm.

== Etymology ==
The species name refers to Tiango, the type locality.
