= Seticosta concava =

Scientific classification
- Kingdom: Animalia
- Phylum: Arthropoda
- Class: Insecta
- Order: Lepidoptera
- Family: Tortricidae
- Genus: Seticosta
- Species: S. concava

Binomial name
- Seticosta concava Razowski & Pelz, 2004

Species of moth

Seticosta concava is a species of moth of the family Tortricidae. It is found in Morona-Santiago Province, Ecuador.

The wingspan is 21 mm.

== Etymology ==
The species name refers to the shape of the posterior edge of the basal area of the forewings and is derived from Latin concava (meaning concave).
