= Crocidosema leprarum =

Scientific classification
- Domain: Eukaryota
- Kingdom: Animalia
- Phylum: Arthropoda
- Class: Insecta
- Order: Lepidoptera
- Family: Tortricidae
- Genus: Crocidosema
- Species: C. leprarum

Binomial name
- Crocidosema leprarum (Walsingham in Sharp, 1907)

Synonyms
- Gypsonoma leprarum Walsingham, 1907; Crocidosema leprara – Zimmerman, 1978

Moth of the family Tortricidae endemic to the Hawaiian islands

Crocidosema leprarum is a moth of the family Tortricidae. It was described by Lord Walsingham in 1907. It is endemic to the Hawaiian islands (or possibly, a natural introduction), with records from Oahu, Molokai, Nīhoa, and Necker, and possibly French Frigate Shoals and Laysan. It is a lowland and coastal species.

The larvae feed on Sesuvium species.
