= Seticosta punctum =

Scientific classification
- Kingdom: Animalia
- Phylum: Arthropoda
- Clade: Pancrustacea
- Class: Insecta
- Order: Lepidoptera
- Family: Tortricidae
- Genus: Seticosta
- Species: S. punctum

Binomial name
- Seticosta punctum Razowski & Becker, 1999

Species of moth

Seticosta punctum is a species of moth of the family Tortricidae. It is found in Minas Gerais, Brazil.
