= Seticosta aeolozona =

Scientific classification
- Kingdom: Animalia
- Phylum: Arthropoda
- Class: Insecta
- Order: Lepidoptera
- Family: Tortricidae
- Genus: Seticosta
- Species: S. aeolozona

Binomial name
- Seticosta aeolozona (Meyrick, 1926)

Synonyms
- Eulia aeolozona Meyrick, 1926

Species of moth

Seticosta aeolozona is a species of moth of the family Tortricidae. It is found in Colombia.
