= Acmanthina acmanthes =

Scientific classification
- Domain: Eukaryota
- Kingdom: Animalia
- Phylum: Arthropoda
- Class: Insecta
- Order: Lepidoptera
- Family: Tortricidae
- Genus: Acmanthina
- Species: A. acmanthes

Binomial name
- Acmanthina acmanthes (Meyrick, 1931)

Synonyms
- Peronea acmanthes Meyrick, 1931; Acleris acmanthes (Meyrick, 1931); "Eulia" acmanthes (Meyrick, 1931); Haemateulia acmanthes (Meyrick, 1931)

Species of moth

″

Acmanthina acmanthes is a species of moth of the family Tortricidae in tribe Euliini. It is found in Chile and Argentina.

== Taxonomy ==
The species was first described in 1931 by Edward Meyrick as Peronea acmanthes. It was subsequently transferred to genus Acleris in 1958, from where it was transferred in 1995 to "Eulia", then in 1999 to Haemateulia, and transferred once more in 2000 to its current genus, Acmanthina, of which it is the namesake and type species.

== Distribution and habitat ==
Acmanthina acmanthes occurs in Argentina and Chile, where it has been found in the Valparaiso Region (Quillota Province), the O'Higgins Region (Cachapoal Province), the Maule Region (in the Talca and Curico provinces), the Bio-Bio Region (Bio-Bio Province), the Ñuble Region, the Araucania Region (Cautín Province) and the Los Lagos Region (Llanquihue Province). It has been found at elevations from 300 to 1400 m.

== Appearance ==
Acmanthina acmanthes has dark black and brown forewings with a white patch and a forewing length of 6.2–7.2 mm. Antennae are serrated in male specimens only.
