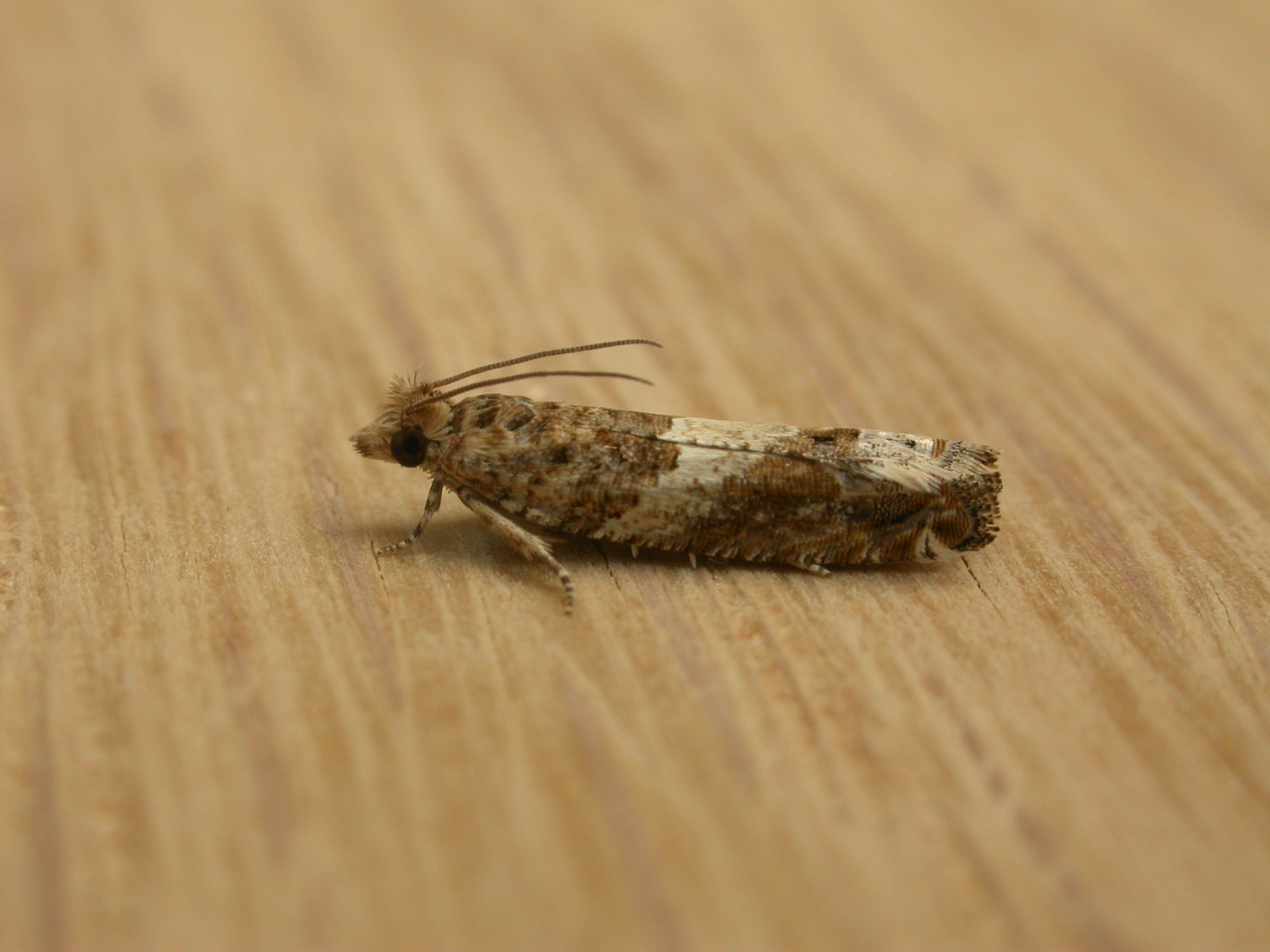
- Imago of the widespread C. plebejana, Aranda, Australian Capital Territory

Scientific classification
- Kingdom: Animalia
- Phylum: Arthropoda
- Clade: Pancrustacea
- Class: Insecta
- Order: Lepidoptera
- Family: Tortricidae
- Tribe: Eucosmini
- Genus: Crocidosema; Zeller, 1847

Type species
- Crocidosema plebejana Zeller, 1847

Diversity
- 28 species

Synonyms
- Crocidosoma (lapsus); Crosidosema (lapsus); Heligmocera Walsingham, 1891; Parasuleima Clarke, 1965

= Crocidosema =

Genus of tortrix moths

Crocidosema is a genus of tortrix moths (family Tortricidae) belonging to the tribe Eucosmini of subfamily Olethreutinae. They are found mostly in the Southern Hemisphere, being especially common in the Neotropics. But some occur elsewhere, such as on the Hawaiian Islands.

At least some of them can be recognized by their wing veins. In the hindwings, vein 3 and 4 originate from a common stalk, and are approached by the fifth vein at its end. In the forewings, veins 4-6 converge at the termen.

These moths are mostly small and inconspicuous. But C. plebejana is an occasional pest of cotton (and some other mostly malvaceous plants) and has become widely distributed by trade in agricultural produce, while the lantana flower-cluster moth (C. lantana) is employed in Lantana biocontrol and has been deliberately introduced to some locations.

== Species ==
As of 2010, the 29 described species of Crocidosema are:

- Crocidosema accessa (Heinrich, 1931)
- Crocidosema apicinota (Turner, 1946)
- Crocidosema aporema (Walsingham, 1914)
- Crocidosema callida Meyrick, 1917
- Crocidosema calvifrons (Walsingham, 1891)
- Crocidosema cecidogena (Kieffer, 1908)
- Crocidosema compsoptila Meyrick, 1936
- Crocidosema cosmoptila Meyrick, 1917
- Crocidosema evidens (Meyrick, 1917)
- Crocidosema impendens Meyrick, 1917
- Crocidosema insulana Aurivillius, 1922
- Crocidosema lantana Busck, 1910 – lantana flower-cluster moth, lantana tortricid moth
- Crocidosema leprarum Walsingham in Sharp, 1907
- Crocidosema leptozona (Meyrick, 1921)
- Crocidosema longipalpana (Moschler, 1891)
- Crocidosema nitsugai Vargas, 2019
- Crocidosema marcidellum Walsingham in Sharp, 1907
- Crocidosema meridospila (Meyrick, 1922)
- Crocidosema orfilai Pastrana, 1964
- Crocidosema perplexana (Fernald, 1901)
- Crocidosema plebejana Zeller, 1847
- Crocidosema pollutana (Zeller, 1877)
- Crocidosema pristinana (Zeller, 1877)
- Crocidosema pyrrhulana (Zeller, 1877)
- Crocidosema roraria Meyrick, 1917
- Crocidosema sediliata (Meyrick, 1912)
- Crocidosema thematica (Meyrick, 1918)
- Crocidosema unica (Heinrich, 1923)
- Crocidosema venata Razowski & Wojtusiak, 2006
- Crocidosema veternana (Zeller, 1877)

(incomplete list)
