= Apotomops rhampha =

Scientific classification
- Domain: Eukaryota
- Kingdom: Animalia
- Phylum: Arthropoda
- Class: Insecta
- Order: Lepidoptera
- Family: Tortricidae
- Genus: Apotomops
- Species: A. rhampha

Binomial name
- Apotomops rhampha Razowski & Wojtusiak, 2008

Species of insect

Apotomops rhampha is a species of moth of the family Tortricidae. It is found in Ecuador (Loja Province).

The wingspan is 20 mm.
