= Seticosta arachnogramma =

Scientific classification
- Kingdom: Animalia
- Phylum: Arthropoda
- Class: Insecta
- Order: Lepidoptera
- Family: Tortricidae
- Genus: Seticosta
- Species: S. arachnogramma

Binomial name
- Seticosta arachnogramma (Meyrick, 1926)

Synonyms
- Eulia arachnogramma Meyrick, 1926

Species of moth

Seticosta arachnogramma is a species of moth of the family Tortricidae. It is found in Colombia.
