= Proeulia =

Scientific classification
- Domain: Eukaryota
- Kingdom: Animalia
- Phylum: Arthropoda
- Class: Insecta
- Order: Lepidoptera
- Family: Tortricidae
- Subfamily: Tortricinae
- Tribe: Cochylini
- Genus: Proeulia; Clarke, 1962

Species
- See text

Synonyms
- Proseulia Razowski, 1988

Genus of tortrix moths

Proeulia is a genus of moths belonging to the family Tortricidae.

== Species ==
- Proeulia aethalea Obraztsov, 1964
- Proeulia apospasta Obraztsov, 1964
- Proeulia approximata (Butler, 1883)
- Proeulia auraria (Clarke, 1949)
- Proeulia boliviae Razowski, 1988
- Proeulia chancoana Razowski & Pelz, 2010
- Proeulia chromaffinis Razowski, 1995
- Proeulia chrysopteris (Butler, 1883)
- Proeulia clenchi Clarke, 1980
- Proeulia cneca Obraztsov, 1964
- Proeulia cnecona Razowski, 1995
- Proeulia domeykoi Razowski & Pelz, 2010
- Proeulia elguetae Razowski, 1999
- Proeulia exusta (Butler, 1883)
- Proeulia gielisi Razowski & Pelz, 2010
- Proeulia gladiator Razowski, 1999
- Proeulia griseiceps (Aurivillius, in Skottsberg, 1922)
- Proeulia guayacana Razowski, 1999
- Proeulia inconspicua Obrazstov, 1964
- Proeulia insperata Razowski, 1995
- Proeulia kuscheli Clarke, 1980
- Proeulia lentescens Razowski, 1995
- Proeulia leonina (Butler, 1883)
- Proeulia limaria Razowski & Pelz, 2010
- Proeulia longula Razowski & Pelz, 2010
- Proeulia macrobasana Razowski & Pelz, 2010
- Proeulia mauleana Razowski & Pelz, 2010
- Proeulia nubleana Razowski & Gonzlez, 2003
- Proeulia onerata Razowski, 1995
- Proeulia paronerata Razowski & Pelz, 2010
- Proeulia robinsoni (Aurivillius, in Skottsberg, 1922)
- Proeulia rucapillana Razowski & Pelz, 2010
- Proeulia schouteni Razowski & Pelz, 2010
- Proeulia sublentescens Razowski & Pelz, 2010
- Proeulia talcana Razowski & Pelz, 2010
- Proeulia tenontias (Meyrick, 1912)
- Proeulia tricornuta Razowski & Pelz, 2010
- Proeulia triquetra Obrazstov, 1964
- Proeulia vanderwolfi Razowski & Pelz, 2010
