= Seticosta egregia =

Scientific classification
- Kingdom: Animalia
- Phylum: Arthropoda
- Class: Insecta
- Order: Lepidoptera
- Family: Tortricidae
- Genus: Seticosta
- Species: S. egregia

Binomial name
- Seticosta egregia Razowski & Pelz, 2004

Species of moth

Seticosta egregia is a species of moth of the family Tortricidae. It is found in Ecuador in the provinces of Morona-Santiago and Zamora-Chinchipe.

The wingspan is 17 mm.
