= Chileulia =

Scientific classification
- Kingdom: Animalia
- Phylum: Arthropoda
- Clade: Pancrustacea
- Class: Insecta
- Order: Lepidoptera
- Family: Tortricidae
- Tribe: Euliini
- Genus: Chileulia; Powell, 1986

Species
- See text

Genus of tortrix moths

Chileulia is a genus of moths belonging to the family Tortricidae.

== Species ==
- Chileulia stalactitis (Meyrick, 1931)
- Chileulia yerbalocae Razowski & Pelz, 2010
