= Seticosta versabilis =

Scientific classification
- Kingdom: Animalia
- Phylum: Arthropoda
- Class: Insecta
- Order: Lepidoptera
- Family: Tortricidae
- Genus: Seticosta
- Species: S. versabilis

Binomial name
- Seticosta versabilis (Meyrick, 1926)

Synonyms
- Eulia versabilis Meyrick, 1926

Species of moth

Seticosta versabilis is a species of moth of the family Tortricidae. It is found in Bolivia.
