= Apotomops sololana =

Scientific classification
- Domain: Eukaryota
- Kingdom: Animalia
- Phylum: Arthropoda
- Class: Insecta
- Order: Lepidoptera
- Family: Tortricidae
- Genus: Apotomops
- Species: A. sololana

Binomial name
- Apotomops sololana (Razowski, 1999)

Synonyms
- Bonagota sololana Razowski, 1999

Species of moth

Apotomops sololana is a species of moth of the family Tortricidae. It is found in Napo Province, Ecuador.
