= Proeulia boliviae =

Scientific classification
- Kingdom: Animalia
- Phylum: Arthropoda
- Class: Insecta
- Order: Lepidoptera
- Family: Tortricidae
- Genus: Proeulia
- Species: P. boliviae

Binomial name
- Proeulia boliviae Razowski, 1988

Species of moth

Proeulia boliviae is a species of moth of the family Tortricidae. It is found in Bolivia.
