= Seticosta droserana =

Scientific classification
- Domain: Eukaryota
- Kingdom: Animalia
- Phylum: Arthropoda
- Class: Insecta
- Order: Lepidoptera
- Family: Tortricidae
- Genus: Seticosta
- Species: S. droserana

Binomial name
- Seticosta droserana Razowski & Wojtusiak, 2009

Species of moth

Seticosta droserana is a species of moth of the family Tortricidae. It is found in Napo Province, Ecuador.

The wingspan is 24 mm.

== Etymology ==
The species name refers to the colouration of the forewings and is derived from Greek droseros (meaning moistened by dew).
