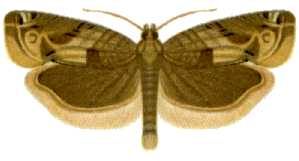

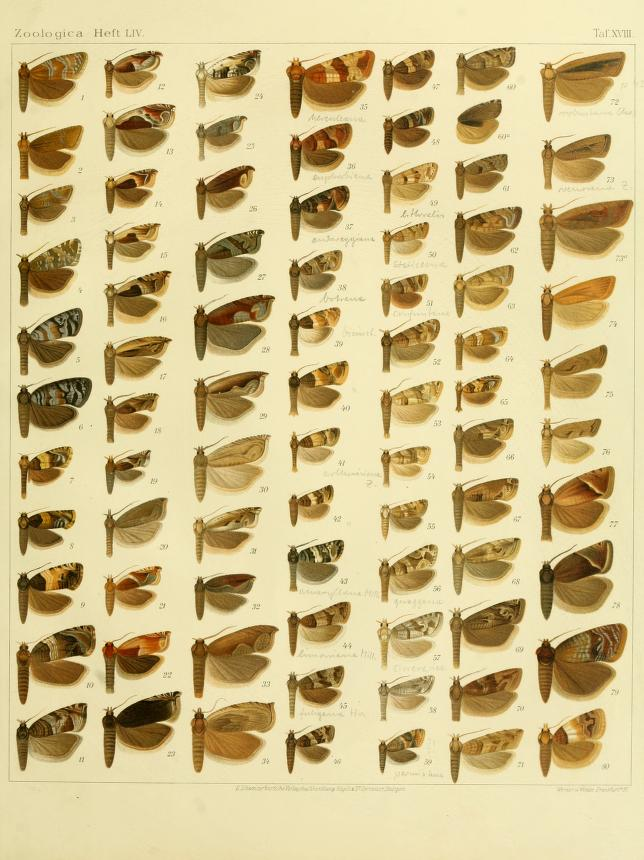
- figure 66 male, 67 female

Scientific classification
- Kingdom: Animalia
- Phylum: Arthropoda
- Clade: Pancrustacea
- Class: Insecta
- Order: Lepidoptera
- Family: Tortricidae
- Genus: Crocidosema
- Species: C. plebejana

Binomial name
- Crocidosema plebejana Zeller, 1847

Synonyms
- Numerous, see text

= Crocidosema plebejana =

Cotton tipworm

Species of moth

Crocidosema plebejana, the cotton tipworm, is a tortrix moth (family Tortricidae), belonging to tribe Eucosmini of subfamily Olethreutinae. It is found today all over the subtropical and tropical regions of the world and even occurs on many oceanic islands – in Polynesia and Saint Helena for example – but has probably been accidentally introduced to much of its current range by humans. In addition, it is also found in some cooler regions, e.g. in Europe except in the east and north; this is probably also not natural, as it was, for example, not recorded in the British Isles before 1900.

It is the type species of its genus Crocidosema, established by Philipp Christoph Zeller when he described the present species in 1847, as he found it unlike any moth then known to science.

== Description and ecology ==
The wingspan of adults is 12–16 mm. Males are dark brown to black with a white ocellus and dorsal patch. Females are pale brown to tan with a dark basal patch that does not extend to the costa. Julius von Kennel provides a full description.

In the seasonal parts of its range, this moth flies from midsummer to early autumn, e.g. from July to October in southern England. It is not quite clear whether there are several broods per year in the tropics, as it has been recorded on the Marquesas Islands only between January and April for example. The adults are active in the evening and are attracted to lights.

The larvae mainly feed inside the seed capsules and shoots of Malvaceae such as China jute (Abutilon theophrasti), marsh mallow (Althaea officinalis), the tree mallow (Lavatera arborea), arrowleaf sida (Sida rhombifolia), and various Gossypium (cottons) and Malva (typical mallows) species. The caterpillars have been found on other eurosids, including Crataegus hawthorns (Rosaceae), Cucurbita pepo pumpkins (Cucurbitaceae), and Eucalyptus (Myrtaceae). They may occasionally become pests of cotton.

== Synonyms ==
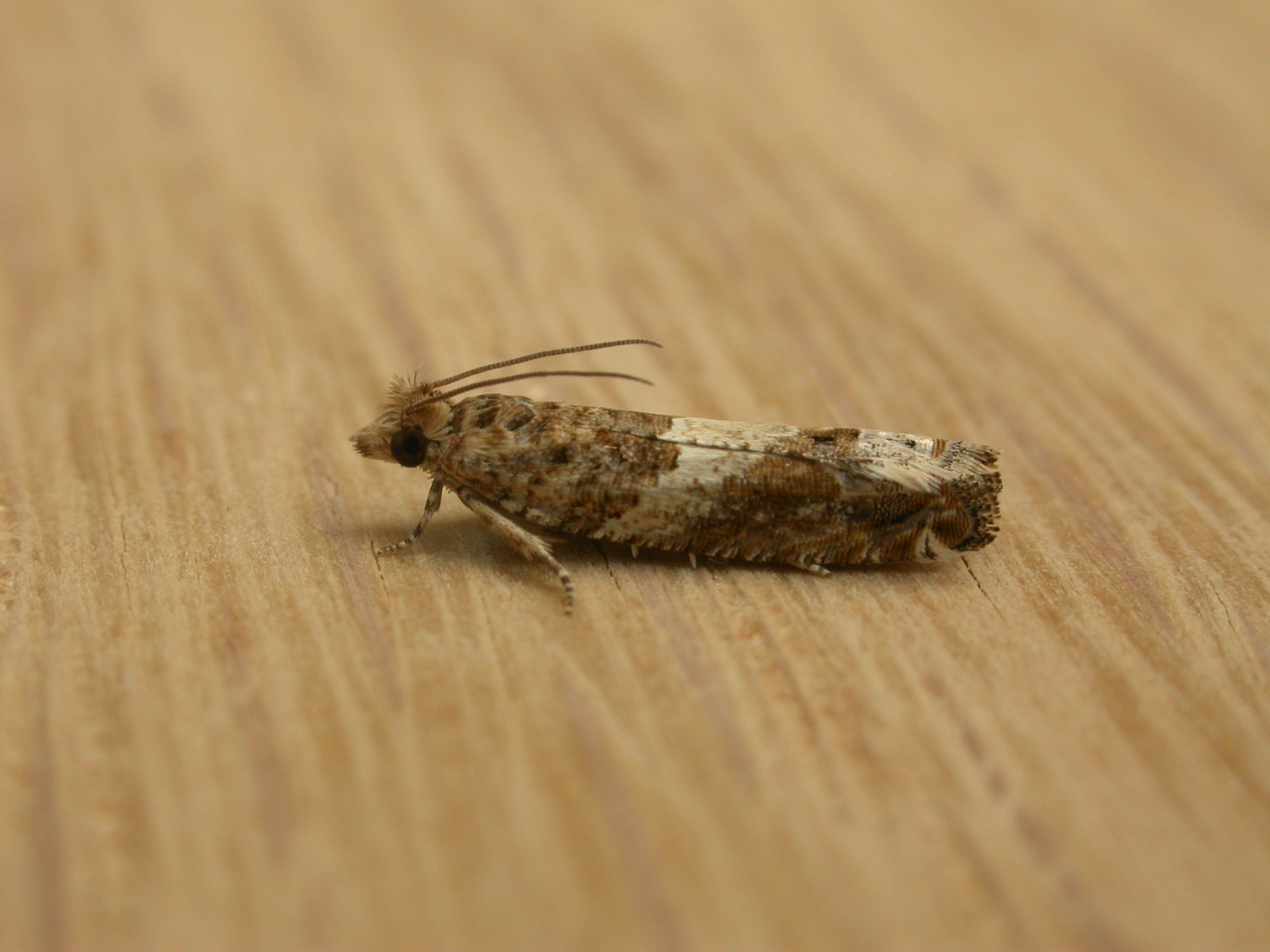

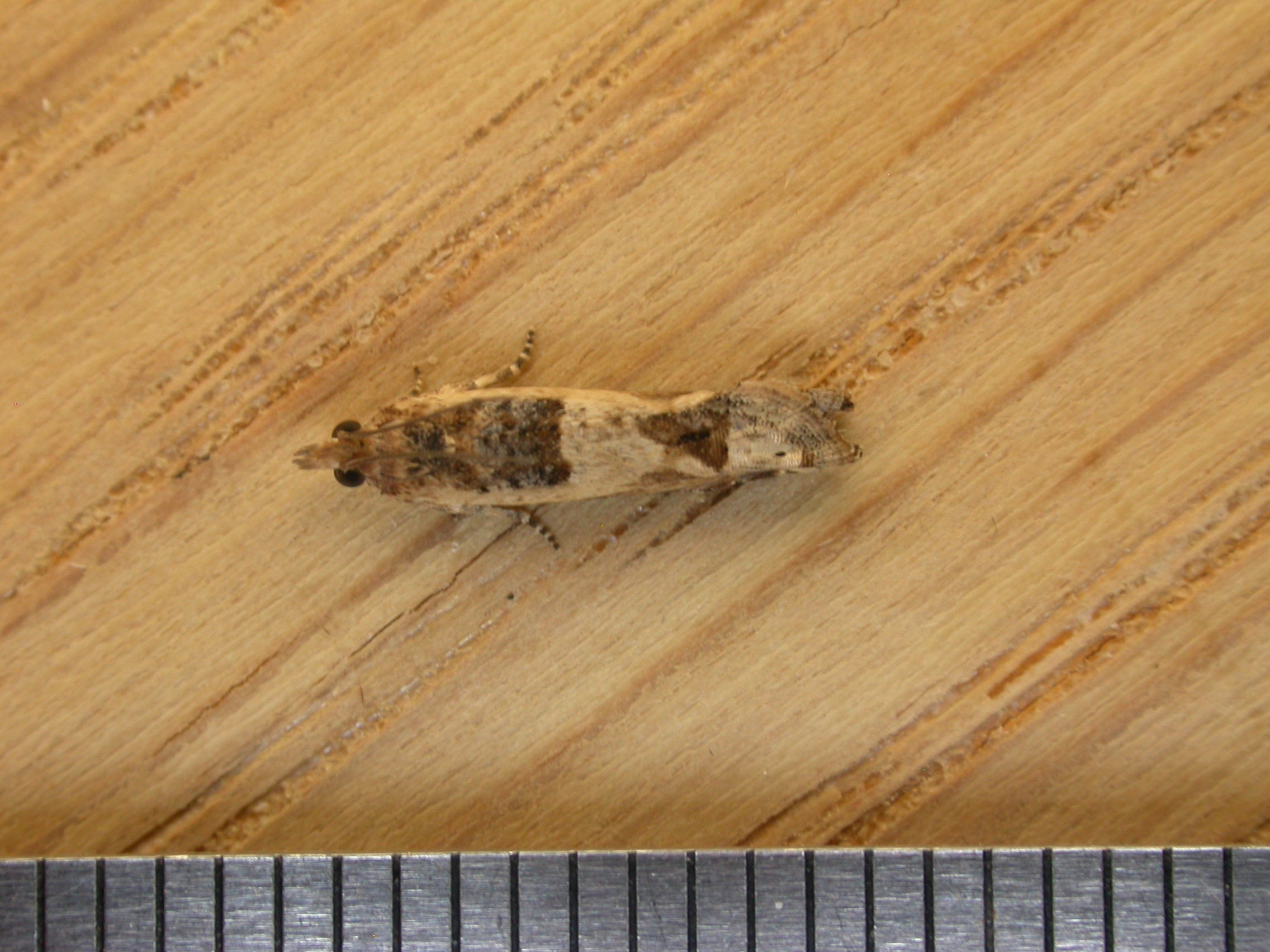

This species was described time and again under different names from all over its wide range. But not even subspecies are accepted today, rendering all those other names invalid. In addition, it was variously assigned to other tortrix moth genera – usually close relatives of Crocidosema such as Epinotia (under its junior synonyms Paedisca, Proteopteryx and Steganoptycha) or Eucosma, but sometimes more distantly related Olethreutinae such as Grapholita (under the spelling variant Grapholitha) and Hedya (as Penthina, a misspelling of the junior synonym Pendina). In addition to being the type species of Crocidosema, one of these redescriptions – at that time still unrecognized as what it was – was used as late as 1965 to establish the genus Parasuleima as supposedly distinct from Crocidosema.

The invalid scientific names of this moth are:

- Crocidosema blackburnii (Butler, 1881)
- Crocidosema bostrychodes Diakonoff, 1992
- Crocidosema iris Diakonoff, 1984
- Crocidosema plebeiana (lapsus)
- Crocidosema plebiana (lapsus)
- Crocidosema ptiladelpha Meyrick, 1917
- Crocidosema synneurota Meyrick, 1926
- Eucosma charmera Turner, 1946
- Eucosma plebeiana (lapsus)
- Eucosma tornocycla Turner, 1946
- Grapholitha altheana (Mann, 1855)
- Grapholitha excitana Moschler, 1891
- Grapholitha peregrinana Moschler, 1866
- Paedisca lavaterana Milliere, 1863
- Parasuleima insulana (Aurivillius in Skottsberg, 1922)
- Penthina altheana Mann, 1855
- Proteopteryx blackburnii Butler, 1881
- Stechanoptycha altheana (lapsus)
- Steganoptycha altheana (Mann, 1855)
- Steganoptycha obscura E. Wollaston, 1879
- Steganoptycha signatana Walsingham, 1894 (non Douglas, 1845: preoccupied)
