= Rebinea brunnea =

Scientific classification
- Kingdom: Animalia
- Phylum: Arthropoda
- Class: Insecta
- Order: Lepidoptera
- Family: Tortricidae
- Genus: Rebinea
- Species: R. brunnea

Binomial name
- Rebinea brunnea Razowski & Pelz, 2010

Species of moth

Rebinea brunnea is a species of moth of the family Tortricidae. It is found in Araucanía Region, Chile.

The wingspan is 15 mm.

== Etymology ==
The species name refers to colouration of the forewings and is derived from Latin brunnea (meaning brown).
