= Proeulia leonina =

Scientific classification
- Kingdom: Animalia
- Phylum: Arthropoda
- Class: Insecta
- Order: Lepidoptera
- Family: Tortricidae
- Genus: Proeulia
- Species: P. leonina

Binomial name
- Proeulia leonina (Butler, 1883)

Synonyms
- Sciaphila leonina Butler, 1883

Species of moth

Proeulia leonina is a species of moth of the family Tortricidae. It is found in Chile in the Valparaíso and Maule regions.
