= Ptychocroca nigropenicillia =

Scientific classification
- Kingdom: Animalia
- Phylum: Arthropoda
- Class: Insecta
- Order: Lepidoptera
- Family: Tortricidae
- Genus: Ptychocroca
- Species: P. nigropenicillia

Binomial name
- Ptychocroca nigropenicillia Brown & Razowski, 2003

Species of moth

Ptychocroca nigropenicillia is a species of moth of the family Tortricidae. It is found in Chile (Santiago Province and Valparaíso Region).

== Etymology ==
The species name refers to the black scaling surrounding the hindwing hair-pencil.
