= Proeulia domeykoi =

Scientific classification
- Kingdom: Animalia
- Phylum: Arthropoda
- Class: Insecta
- Order: Lepidoptera
- Family: Tortricidae
- Genus: Proeulia
- Species: P. domeykoi

Binomial name
- Proeulia domeykoi Razowski & Pelz, 2010

Species of moth

Proeulia domeykoi is a species of moth of the family Tortricidae. It is found in the Coquimbo Region of Chile.

The wingspan is 15 mm.

== Etymology ==
The species is named in honour of Ignacy Domeyko, a Polish professor, geologist and mineralogist.
