= Eliachna hemicordata =

Scientific classification
- Domain: Eukaryota
- Kingdom: Animalia
- Phylum: Arthropoda
- Class: Insecta
- Order: Lepidoptera
- Family: Tortricidae
- Genus: Eliachna
- Species: E. hemicordata

Binomial name
- Eliachna hemicordata Brown & McPherson, 2002

Species of moth

Eliachna hemicordata is a species of moth of the family Tortricidae. It is found in Argentina (Neuquén, Río Negro) and Chile (Malleco, Bio Bio and Cautín).

The length of the forewings is 7.8–8 millimetres (0.31–0.31 in).
