= Proeulia macrobasana =

Scientific classification
- Kingdom: Animalia
- Phylum: Arthropoda
- Class: Insecta
- Order: Lepidoptera
- Family: Tortricidae
- Genus: Proeulia
- Species: P. macrobasana

Binomial name
- Proeulia macrobasana Razowski & Pelz, 2010

Species of moth

Proeulia macrobasana is a species of moth of the family Tortricidae. It is found in Chile in the Araucanía and Bío Bío regions.

The wingspan is 18 mm.
