= Ptychocroca =

Scientific classification
- Kingdom: Animalia
- Phylum: Arthropoda
- Class: Insecta
- Order: Lepidoptera
- Family: Tortricidae
- Tribe: Euliini
- Genus: Ptychocroca; Brown & Razowski, 2003

Genus of tortrix moths

Ptychocroca is a genus of moths belonging to the family Tortricidae.

== Species ==
- Ptychocroca apenicillia Brown & Razowski, 2003
- Ptychocroca crocoptycha (Meyrick, 1931)
- Ptychocroca galenia (Razowski, 1999)
- Ptychocroca keelioides Brown & Razowski, 2003
- Ptychocroca lineabasalis Brown & Razowski, 2003
- Ptychocroca nigropenicillia Brown & Razowski, 2003
- Ptychocroca simplex Brown & Razowski, 2003
- Ptychocroca wilkinsonii (Butler, 1883)

== Etymology ==
The generic name is an anagram of the specific name crocoptycha.

== See also ==
- List of Tortricidae genera
