= Proeulia griseiceps =

Scientific classification
- Kingdom: Animalia
- Phylum: Arthropoda
- Class: Insecta
- Order: Lepidoptera
- Family: Tortricidae
- Genus: Proeulia
- Species: P. griseiceps

Binomial name
- Proeulia griseiceps (Aurivillius, in Skottsberg, 1922)

Synonyms
- Eulia griseiceps Aurivillius, in Skottsberg, 1922; Eulia striolana Aurivillius, in Skottsberg, 1922

Species of moth

Proeulia griseiceps is a species of moth of the family Tortricidae. It is found on the Juan Fernández Islands off the coast of Chile.
