= Rebinea erebina =

Scientific classification
- Domain: Eukaryota
- Kingdom: Animalia
- Phylum: Arthropoda
- Class: Insecta
- Order: Lepidoptera
- Family: Tortricidae
- Genus: Rebinea
- Species: R. erebina

Binomial name
- Rebinea erebina (Butler, 1883)

Synonyms
- Sericoris erebina Butler, 1883; Arotrophora balsamodes Meyrick, 1931

Species of moth

Rebinea erebina is a species of moth of the family Tortricidae. It is found in Chile (Valparaiso, Bio-Bio and Araucania Regions) and Argentina. It is found in habitats ranging from coastal lowlands at about 50 meters altitude to elevations of 1400 meters.

The length of the forewings is 6.6–8.8 mm for males and 6.5–8.2 mm for females.
