= Proeulia gielisi =

Scientific classification
- Kingdom: Animalia
- Phylum: Arthropoda
- Class: Insecta
- Order: Lepidoptera
- Family: Tortricidae
- Genus: Proeulia
- Species: P. gielisi

Binomial name
- Proeulia gielisi Razowski & Pelz, 2010

Species of moth

Proeulia gielisi is a species of moth of the family Tortricidae. It is found in Santiago Province, Chile.

The wingspan is 25 mm.

== Etymology ==
The species is named in honour of Cees Gielis.
