= Nesochoris holographa =

Scientific classification
- Kingdom: Animalia
- Phylum: Arthropoda
- Class: Insecta
- Order: Lepidoptera
- Family: Tortricidae
- Genus: Nesochoris
- Species: N. holographa

Binomial name
- Nesochoris holographa Clarke, 1965

Species of moth

Nesochoris holographa is a species of moth of the family Tortricidae. It is found in Chile's Juan Fernandez Islands.
