= Ptychocroca apenicillia =

Scientific classification
- Kingdom: Animalia
- Phylum: Arthropoda
- Class: Insecta
- Order: Lepidoptera
- Family: Tortricidae
- Genus: Ptychocroca
- Species: P. apenicillia

Binomial name
- Ptychocroca apenicillia Brown & Razowski, 2003

Species of moth

Ptychocroca apenicillia is a species of moth of the family Tortricidae. It is found in Chile (Aconcagua Province, Santiago Province, Maule Region and Coquimbo Region).

The wingspan is about 26 mm.
