= Proeulia guayacana =

Scientific classification
- Kingdom: Animalia
- Phylum: Arthropoda
- Class: Insecta
- Order: Lepidoptera
- Family: Tortricidae
- Genus: Proeulia
- Species: P. guayacana

Binomial name
- Proeulia guayacana Razowski, 1999

Species of moth

Proeulia guayacana is a species of moth of the family Tortricidae. It is found in Chile.
