= Proeulia auraria =

Scientific classification
- Kingdom: Animalia
- Phylum: Arthropoda
- Class: Insecta
- Order: Lepidoptera
- Family: Tortricidae
- Genus: Proeulia
- Species: P. auraria

Binomial name
- Proeulia auraria (Clarke, 1949)

Synonyms
- Eulia auraria Clarke, 1949

Species of moth

Proeulia auraria is a species of moth of the family Tortricidae. It is found in Chile (Coquimbo Region, Valparaíso Region and Santiago Province).

The length of the forewing is 7–12 mm. Most of the small specimens have the forewing markings reduced to an incomplete oblique band running from the middle of the costa toward the tornus. The golden-ocherous ground colour of the forewing is more or less mottled with brown or ferruginous. The hindwings are white, ocherous white or pale cinereous (ash grey), in some specimens distinctly speckled with grey.
