= Proeulia tenontias =

Scientific classification
- Kingdom: Animalia
- Phylum: Arthropoda
- Class: Insecta
- Order: Lepidoptera
- Family: Tortricidae
- Genus: Proeulia
- Species: P. tenontias

Binomial name
- Proeulia tenontias (Meyrick, 1912)

Synonyms
- Cnephasia tenontias Meyrick, 1912

Species of moth

Proeulia tenontias is a species of moth of the family Tortricidae. It is found in Chile in Valparaíso and Maule regions.
