= Ptychocroca galenia =

Scientific classification
- Kingdom: Animalia
- Phylum: Arthropoda
- Class: Insecta
- Order: Lepidoptera
- Family: Tortricidae
- Genus: Ptychocroca
- Species: P. galenia

Binomial name
- Ptychocroca galenia (Razowski, 1999)

Synonyms
- Haemateulia galenia Razowski, 1999

Species of moth

Ptychocroca galenia is a species of moth of the family Tortricidae. It is found in Chile (from the Talca Province to the Malleco Province). It has been recorded from altitudes ranging from near sea level to about 1,600 meters.

Adults are on wing from November to January, probably in one generation per year.
