= Proeulia cneca =

Scientific classification
- Kingdom: Animalia
- Phylum: Arthropoda
- Class: Insecta
- Order: Lepidoptera
- Family: Tortricidae
- Genus: Proeulia
- Species: P. cneca

Binomial name
- Proeulia cneca Obraztsov, 1964

Species of moth

Proeulia cneca is a species of moth of the family Tortricidae. It is found in Chile.

The length of the forewings is about 11 mm. The forewings are ochreous with a slight silvery shine and some areas covered with yellow scales. The hindwings are white.
