= Proeulia mauleana =

Scientific classification
- Kingdom: Animalia
- Phylum: Arthropoda
- Class: Insecta
- Order: Lepidoptera
- Family: Tortricidae
- Genus: Proeulia
- Species: P. mauleana

Binomial name
- Proeulia mauleana Razowski & Pelz, 2010

Species of moth

Proeulia mauleana is a species of moth of the family Tortricidae. It is found in the Maule Region of Chile.

The wingspan is 21.5 mm.
