= Varifula =

Scientific classification
- Kingdom: Animalia
- Phylum: Arthropoda
- Class: Insecta
- Order: Lepidoptera
- Family: Tortricidae
- Tribe: Euliini
- Genus: Varifula; Razowski, 1995

Species
- See text

Genus of tortrix moths

Varifula is a genus of moths belonging to the family Tortricidae.

== Species ==
- Varifula fulvaria Blanchard, in Gay, 1852
- Varifula trancasiana Razowski & Pelz, 2010
