= Argentulia gentilii =

Scientific classification
- Domain: Eukaryota
- Kingdom: Animalia
- Phylum: Arthropoda
- Class: Insecta
- Order: Lepidoptera
- Family: Tortricidae
- Genus: Argentulia
- Species: A. gentilii

Binomial name
- Argentulia gentilii Brown, 1998

Species of moth

Argentulia gentilii is a species of moth of the family Tortricidae. It is found in Neuquén Province, Argentina.

The length of the forewings is 6–7 mm (0.24–0.28 in).
