= Proeulia longula =

Scientific classification
- Kingdom: Animalia
- Phylum: Arthropoda
- Clade: Pancrustacea
- Class: Insecta
- Order: Lepidoptera
- Family: Tortricidae
- Genus: Proeulia
- Species: P. longula

Binomial name
- Proeulia longula Razowski & Pelz, 2010

Species of moth

Proeulia longula is a species of moth of the family Tortricidae. It is found in Chile in the Bío Bío and Maule regions.

The wingspan is 20 mm.

== Etymology ==
The species name refers to some elongate parts of the genitalia and is derived from Latin longus (meaning long) and ula (a suffix expressing diminution).
