= Haemateulia haematitis =

Scientific classification
- Kingdom: Animalia
- Phylum: Arthropoda
- Clade: Pancrustacea
- Class: Insecta
- Order: Lepidoptera
- Family: Tortricidae
- Genus: Haemateulia
- Species: H. haematitis

Binomial name
- Haemateulia haematitis (Meyrick, 1931)

Synonyms
- Eulia haematitis Meyrick, 1931

Species of moth

Haemateulia haematitis is a species of moth of the family Tortricidae. It is exclusively found in Chile (Llanquihue Province, Malleco Province, Ñuble Region, Osorno Province) and Argentina (Chubut Province, Cinco de Mayo Neuquén Province, Río Negro Province).
