= Proeulia inconspicua =

Scientific classification
- Kingdom: Animalia
- Phylum: Arthropoda
- Class: Insecta
- Order: Lepidoptera
- Family: Tortricidae
- Genus: Proeulia
- Species: P. inconspicua

Binomial name
- Proeulia inconspicua Obraztsov, 1964

Species of moth

Proeulia inconspicua is a species of moth of the family Tortricidae. It is found in Chile.

The length of the forewings is about 11 mm. The forewings are ochreous, sprinkled with ferruginous. The hindwings are very pale fuscous white, almost white, sprinkled with grey.
