= Varifula fulvaria =

Scientific classification
- Kingdom: Animalia
- Phylum: Arthropoda
- Class: Insecta
- Order: Lepidoptera
- Family: Tortricidae
- Genus: Varifula
- Species: V. fulvaria

Binomial name
- Varifula fulvaria (Blanchard, 1852)

Synonyms
- Tortrix fulvaria Blanchard, 1852; Oenectra dives Butler, 1883

Species of moth

Varifula fulvaria is a species of moth of the family Tortricidae. It is found in Valparaíso Region, Chile.
