= Proeulia aethalea =

Scientific classification
- Kingdom: Animalia
- Phylum: Arthropoda
- Class: Insecta
- Order: Lepidoptera
- Family: Tortricidae
- Genus: Proeulia
- Species: P. aethalea

Binomial name
- Proeulia aethalea Obraztsov, 1964

Species of moth

Proeulia aethalea is a species of moth of the family Tortricidae. It is found in Chile.

The length of the forewings is about 11 mm. The ground colour of the forewings is fuscous with indistinct, somewhat olive-brownish or grey-brownish markings. The hindwings are yellowish white, mottled with pale olive brown.
