= Recintona cnephasiodes =

Scientific classification
- Kingdom: Animalia
- Phylum: Arthropoda
- Class: Insecta
- Order: Lepidoptera
- Family: Tortricidae
- Genus: Recintona
- Species: R. cnephasiodes

Binomial name
- Recintona cnephasiodes Razowski, 1999

Species of moth

Recintona cnephasiodes is a species of moth of the family Tortricidae. It is found in Chile in the Maule and Bío Bío regions.
