= Accuminulia longiphallus =

Scientific classification
- Kingdom: Animalia
- Phylum: Arthropoda
- Class: Insecta
- Order: Lepidoptera
- Family: Tortricidae
- Genus: Accuminulia
- Species: A. longiphallus

Binomial name
- Accuminulia longiphallus Brown, 1999

Species of moth

Accuminulia longiphallus is a species of moth of the family Tortricidae. It was first described by John W. Brown in 1999 and is found in Chile.

The length of the forewings is 6.5–7.8 mm for males and about 6.1 mm for females.
