= Haemateulia barrigana =

Scientific classification
- Domain: Eukaryota
- Kingdom: Animalia
- Phylum: Arthropoda
- Class: Insecta
- Order: Lepidoptera
- Family: Tortricidae
- Genus: Haemateulia
- Species: H. barrigana

Binomial name
- Haemateulia barrigana Razowski & Gonzlez, 2003

Species of moth

Haemateulia barrigana is a species of moth of the family Tortricidae. It is found in Chile (Curico Province and Nuble Province), and Argentina (Neuquén and Lucar). Adults have been recorded on wing in February and March.
