= Proeulia chrysopteris =

Scientific classification
- Kingdom: Animalia
- Phylum: Arthropoda
- Class: Insecta
- Order: Lepidoptera
- Family: Tortricidae
- Genus: Proeulia
- Species: P. chrysopteris

Binomial name
- Proeulia chrysopteris (Butler, 1883)

Synonyms
- Tortrix chrysopteris Butler, 1883

Species of moth

Proeulia chrysopteris is a species of moth belonging to the family Tortricidae. It is found in Chile (Valparaíso Region, Santiago Province, Guayacán Province, Concepción Province and the Araucania Region).

The length of the forewings is 10–13 mm. Adults are rather variable, with ochreous, golden ochreous, testaceous, or hessian brown forewings with a more or less intensive, ferruginous-ochreous reticulation and/or incomplete, oblique rows of blackish or greyish dots in the apical wing portion. The hindwings are whitish yellow to ochreous.
