= Eliachna digitana =

Scientific classification
- Domain: Eukaryota
- Kingdom: Animalia
- Phylum: Arthropoda
- Class: Insecta
- Order: Lepidoptera
- Family: Tortricidae
- Genus: Eliachna
- Species: E. digitana

Binomial name
- Eliachna digitana Brown & McPherson, 2002

Species of moth

Eliachna digitana is a species of moth of the family Tortricidae. It is found from Chile (Ñuble Province, Santiago, Maule Region) to Argentina (Chubut Province). The habitat ranges from coastal Nothofagus forests to arid uplands.

The length of the forewings is 5.9–7 millimetres (0.23–0.28 in) for males and 6.5–7.6 millimetres (0.26–0.30 in) for females. Adults have been recorded on wing from October to April.
