= Lypothora walsinghamii =

Scientific classification
- Kingdom: Animalia
- Phylum: Arthropoda
- Class: Insecta
- Order: Lepidoptera
- Family: Tortricidae
- Genus: Lypothora
- Species: L. walsinghamii

Binomial name
- Lypothora walsinghamii (Butler, 1883)

Synonyms
- Teras walsinghamii Butler, 1883; Teras blanchardii Butler, 1883

Species of moth

Lypothora walsinghamii is a species of moth of the family Tortricidae. It is found in Chile.
