= Bonagota =

Scientific classification
- Kingdom: Animalia
- Phylum: Arthropoda
- Class: Insecta
- Order: Lepidoptera
- Family: Tortricidae
- Tribe: Euliini
- Genus: Bonagota; Razowski, 1986

Species
- See text

Genus of tortrix moths

Bonagota is a genus of moths belonging to the family Tortricidae.

== Species ==
- Bonagota arizonae Razowski & Becker, 2000
- Bonagota bogotana Walker, 1863
- Bonagota chiapasana Razowski & Becker, 2000
- Bonagota costaricana Razowski & Becker, 2000
- Bonagota dominicana Razowski, 1999
- Bonagota melanecta Meyrick, 1917
- Bonagota mexicana Razowski & Becker, 2000
- Bonagota moronaecola Razowski & Wojtusiak, 2006
- Bonagota piosana Razowski & Wojtusiak, 2006
- Bonagota salubricola Meyrick, 1931
