= Apotomops =

Scientific classification
- Kingdom: Animalia
- Phylum: Arthropoda
- Clade: Pancrustacea
- Class: Insecta
- Order: Lepidoptera
- Family: Tortricidae
- Tribe: Euliini
- Genus: Apotomops; Powell & Obraztsov, 1986

Species
- See text

Genus of tortrix moths

Apotomops is a genus of moths belonging to the family Tortricidae.

== Species ==
- Apotomops boliviana Brown & Razowski, 2003
- Apotomops carchicola Razowski & Becker, 2000
- Apotomops rhampha Razowski & Wojtusiak, 2008
- Apotomops sololana Razowski, 1999
- Apotomops spomotopa Brown & Razowski, 2003
- Apotomops texasana Blanchard & Knudson, 1984
- Apotomops wellingtoniana Kearfott, 1907
