= Ptychocroca simplex =

Scientific classification
- Kingdom: Animalia
- Phylum: Arthropoda
- Class: Insecta
- Order: Lepidoptera
- Family: Tortricidae
- Genus: Ptychocroca
- Species: P. simplex

Binomial name
- Ptychocroca simplex Brown & Razowski, 2003

Species of moth

Ptychocroca simplex is a species of moth of the family Tortricidae. It is found in Valparaíso Region, Chile.

== Etymology ==
The species name refers to the somewhat simple valva of the male genitalia.
