= Ptychocroca crocoptycha =

Scientific classification
- Kingdom: Animalia
- Phylum: Arthropoda
- Class: Insecta
- Order: Lepidoptera
- Family: Tortricidae
- Genus: Ptychocroca
- Species: P. crocoptycha

Binomial name
- Ptychocroca crocoptycha (Meyrick, 1931)

Synonyms
- Peronea crocoptycha Meyrick, 1931; Acleris crocoptycha; Eulia crocoptycha

Species of moth

Ptychocroca crocoptycha is a species of moth of the family Tortricidae. It is found in Argentina and Chile, where it has been recorded at altitudes ranging from near sea level to about 1,000 meters in the Andes.

In Argentina, adults have been recorded on wing in October and December, suggesting one generation per year. In Chile, adults have been reported in February and March.
