= Argentulia montana =

Scientific classification
- Kingdom: Animalia
- Phylum: Arthropoda
- Class: Insecta
- Order: Lepidoptera
- Family: Tortricidae
- Genus: Argentulia
- Species: A. montana

Binomial name
- Argentulia montana (Bartlett-Calvert, 1893)

Synonyms
- Antithesia montana Bartlett-Calvert, 1893; Hypercallia montana; Proeulia montana

Species of moth

Argentulia montana is a species of moth of the family Tortricidae. It is found in Argentina (Neuquén and Chubut provinces) and Chile (Araucanía Region).

The length of the forewings is 6–8 mm for males and 7.5-8.5 mm for females.
