= Proeulia apospasta =

Scientific classification
- Kingdom: Animalia
- Phylum: Arthropoda
- Class: Insecta
- Order: Lepidoptera
- Family: Tortricidae
- Genus: Proeulia
- Species: P. apospasta

Binomial name
- Proeulia apospasta Obraztsov, 1964

Species of moth

Proeulia apospasta is a species of moth of the family Tortricidae. It is found in Chile.

The length of the forewings is about 10 mm. The forewings are ochreous, slightly ferruginous ochreous in external portion, and strongly ochreous at the wing base. The hindwings are light fuscous with a slightly brassy hue.
