= Acmanthina albipuncta =

Scientific classification
- Domain: Eukaryota
- Kingdom: Animalia
- Phylum: Arthropoda
- Class: Insecta
- Order: Lepidoptera
- Family: Tortricidae
- Genus: Acmanthina
- Species: A. albipuncta

Binomial name
- Acmanthina albipuncta Brown, 2000

Species of moth

Acmanthina albipuncta is a species of moth of the family Tortricidae. It is found in Ñuble Region, Chile and in Argentina.
