= Crocidosema insulana =

Scientific classification
- Kingdom: Animalia
- Phylum: Arthropoda
- Class: Insecta
- Order: Lepidoptera
- Family: Tortricidae
- Genus: Crocidosema
- Species: C. insulana

Binomial name
- Crocidosema insulana Aurivillius, 1922

Synonyms
- Parasuleima insulana

Species of moth

Crocidosema insulana is a species of moth of the family Tortricidae. It is found in Chile in Santiago, Masatierra Island, Coquimbo, Valparaiso, Maule and Bío Bío.
