= Proeulia nubleana =

Scientific classification
- Kingdom: Animalia
- Phylum: Arthropoda
- Class: Insecta
- Order: Lepidoptera
- Family: Tortricidae
- Genus: Proeulia
- Species: P. nubleana

Binomial name
- Proeulia nubleana Razowski & González, 2003

Species of moth

Proeulia nubleana is a species of moth of the family Tortricidae. It is found in Chile (Maule Region, Nuble Province).
