= Chileulia stalactitis =

Scientific classification
- Kingdom: Animalia
- Phylum: Arthropoda
- Class: Insecta
- Order: Lepidoptera
- Family: Tortricidae
- Genus: Chileulia
- Species: C. stalactitis

Binomial name
- Chileulia stalactitis (Meyrick, 1931)

Synonyms
- Eulia stalactitis Meyrick, 1931

Species of moth

Chileulia stalactitis is a species of moth of the family Tortricidae. It is found in Argentina (Río Negro Province) and possibly Chile.
