= Nesochoris brachystigma =

Scientific classification
- Kingdom: Animalia
- Phylum: Arthropoda
- Class: Insecta
- Order: Lepidoptera
- Family: Tortricidae
- Genus: Nesochoris
- Species: N. brachystigma

Binomial name
- Nesochoris brachystigma Clarke, 1965

Species of moth

Nesochoris brachystigma is a species of moth of the family Tortricidae. It is found in Chile in the Juan Fernandez Islands.

The wingspan is 14 mm.
