= Haemateulia placens =

Scientific classification
- Kingdom: Animalia
- Phylum: Arthropoda
- Class: Insecta
- Order: Lepidoptera
- Family: Tortricidae
- Genus: Haemateulia
- Species: H. placens

Binomial name
- Haemateulia placens Razowski & Pelz, 2010

Species of moth

Haemateulia placens is a species of moth of the family Tortricidae. It is found in Valparaíso Province, Chile.

The wingspan is about 16 mm.
