= Ptychocroca wilkinsonii =

Scientific classification
- Kingdom: Animalia
- Phylum: Arthropoda
- Class: Insecta
- Order: Lepidoptera
- Family: Tortricidae
- Genus: Ptychocroca
- Species: P. wilkinsonii

Binomial name
- Ptychocroca wilkinsonii (Butler, 1883)

Synonyms
- Sericoris wilkinsonii Butler, 1883; Sericoris wilkinsoni; Bonagota wilkinsonii; Bonagota wilkinsoni

Species of moth

Ptychocroca wilkinsonii is a species of moth of the family Tortricidae. It is found in Valparaíso Region, Chile.
