= Proeulia clenchi =

Scientific classification
- Kingdom: Animalia
- Phylum: Arthropoda
- Class: Insecta
- Order: Lepidoptera
- Family: Tortricidae
- Genus: Proeulia
- Species: P. clenchi

Binomial name
- Proeulia clenchi Clarke, 1980

Species of moth

Proeulia clenchi is a species of moth of the family Tortricidae. It is found in Chile in the Desventuradas Islands.

The wingspan is about 20–22 mm. The ground colour of the forewings is pale ochraceous buff with scattered greyish fuscous irroration (fine streaks). The hindwings are pale buff, mottled with greyish fuscous.

== Etymology ==
The species is named in honour of Harry K. Clench.
