= Eliachna chileana =

Scientific classification
- Kingdom: Animalia
- Phylum: Arthropoda
- Class: Insecta
- Order: Lepidoptera
- Family: Tortricidae
- Genus: Eliachna
- Species: E. chileana

Binomial name
- Eliachna chileana Razowski, 1999

Species of moth

Eliachna chileana is a species of moth of the family Tortricidae. It is found in Chile in the provinces of Talca, Curicó, Cautín, Malleco and Ñuble.

The length of the forewings is 7.1–7.8 mm for males and 6.7–7 mm for females. Adults have been recorded on wing in December and January.
