= Chileulia yerbalocae =

Scientific classification
- Kingdom: Animalia
- Phylum: Arthropoda
- Class: Insecta
- Order: Lepidoptera
- Family: Tortricidae
- Genus: Chileulia
- Species: C. yerbalocae

Binomial name
- Chileulia yerbalocae Razowski & Pelz, 2010

Species of moth

Chileulia yerbalocae is a species of moth of the family Tortricidae. It is found in Santiago, Chile.

The wingspan is 18–22 mm.

== Etymology ==
The species name refers to the type locality, Yerba Loca.
