= Proeulia kuscheli =

Scientific classification
- Kingdom: Animalia
- Phylum: Arthropoda
- Class: Insecta
- Order: Lepidoptera
- Family: Tortricidae
- Genus: Proeulia
- Species: P. kuscheli

Binomial name
- Proeulia kuscheli Clarke, 1980

Species of moth

Proeulia kuscheli is a species of moth of the family Tortricidae. It is found in the Desventuradas Islands off the coast of Chile.

The wingspan is about 18 mm.
