= Proeulia triquetra =

Scientific classification
- Kingdom: Animalia
- Phylum: Arthropoda
- Clade: Pancrustacea
- Class: Insecta
- Order: Lepidoptera
- Family: Tortricidae
- Genus: Proeulia
- Species: P. triquetra

Binomial name
- Proeulia triquetra Obraztsov, 1964

Species of moth

Proeulia triquetra is a species of moth of the family Tortricidae. It is found in Chile.

The length of the forewings is 9–11 mm. The forewings are brownish ocherous with brown reticulation (a net-like pattern). There is a paler, whitish-ocherous, longitudinal streak on the dorsum. The hindwings are hazel greyish to lead grey.
