= Chilips claduncus =

Scientific classification
- Kingdom: Animalia
- Phylum: Arthropoda
- Class: Insecta
- Order: Lepidoptera
- Family: Tortricidae
- Genus: Chilips
- Species: C. claduncus

Binomial name
- Chilips claduncus Razowski, 1988

Species of moth

Chilips claduncus is a species of moth of the family Tortricidae. It is found in Chile.
