= Proeulia limaria =

Scientific classification
- Kingdom: Animalia
- Phylum: Arthropoda
- Class: Insecta
- Order: Lepidoptera
- Family: Tortricidae
- Genus: Proeulia
- Species: P. limaria

Binomial name
- Proeulia limaria Razowski & Pelz, 2010

Species of moth

Proeulia limaria is a species of moth of the family Tortricidae. It is found in Coquimbo Region, Chile.

The wingspan is 23 mm.

== Etymology ==
The species name refers to the Limarí Province.
