= Proeulia approximata =

Scientific classification
- Kingdom: Animalia
- Phylum: Arthropoda
- Class: Insecta
- Order: Lepidoptera
- Family: Tortricidae
- Genus: Proeulia
- Species: P. approximata

Binomial name
- Proeulia approximata (Butler, 1883)

Synonyms
- Oenectra approximata Butler, 1883

Species of moth

Proeulia approximata is a species of moth of the family Tortricidae. It is found in Chile.
