= Proeulia vanderwolfi =

Scientific classification
- Kingdom: Animalia
- Phylum: Arthropoda
- Class: Insecta
- Order: Lepidoptera
- Family: Tortricidae
- Genus: Proeulia
- Species: P. vanderwolfi

Binomial name
- Proeulia vanderwolfi Razowski & Pelz, 2010

Species of moth

Proeulia vanderwolfi is a species of moth of the family Tortricidae. It is found in Chile's O'Higgins Region.

The wingspan is 20 mm.
