= Seticosta coquimbana =

Scientific classification
- Kingdom: Animalia
- Phylum: Arthropoda
- Class: Insecta
- Order: Lepidoptera
- Family: Tortricidae
- Genus: Seticosta
- Species: S. coquimbana

Binomial name
- Seticosta coquimbana Razowski & Pelz, 2010

Species of moth

Seticosta coquimbana is a species of moth of the family Tortricidae. It is found in Coquimbo Region, Chile.

The wingspan is about 18 mm.

== Etymology ==
The species name refers to the type locality.
