= Varifula trancasiana =

Scientific classification
- Kingdom: Animalia
- Phylum: Arthropoda
- Class: Insecta
- Order: Lepidoptera
- Family: Tortricidae
- Genus: Varifula
- Species: V. trancasiana

Binomial name
- Varifula trancasiana Razowski & Pelz, 2010

Species of moth

Varifula trancasiana is a species of moth of the family Tortricidae. It is found in the Bío Bío Region of Chile.

The wingspan is 15 mm.

== Etymology ==
The species name refers to the type locality.
