= Lypothora fernaldii =

Scientific classification
- Kingdom: Animalia
- Phylum: Arthropoda
- Class: Insecta
- Order: Lepidoptera
- Family: Tortricidae
- Genus: Lypothora
- Species: L. fernaldii

Binomial name
- Lypothora fernaldii (Butler, 1883)

Synonyms
- Teras fernaldii Butler, 1883

Species of moth

Lypothora fernaldii is a species of moth of the family Tortricidae. It is found in Chile (Maule, Valdivia).
