= Acmanthina molinana =

Scientific classification
- Kingdom: Animalia
- Phylum: Arthropoda
- Class: Insecta
- Order: Lepidoptera
- Family: Tortricidae
- Genus: Acmanthina
- Species: A. molinana

Binomial name
- Acmanthina molinana Razowski & Pelz, 2010

Species of moth

Acmanthina molinana is a species of moth of the family Tortricidae. It is found in Maule Region, Chile.

The wingspan is about 19 mm.

== Etymology ==
The species name refers to the type locality, Molina.
