= Proeulia tricornuta =

Scientific classification
- Kingdom: Animalia
- Phylum: Arthropoda
- Class: Insecta
- Order: Lepidoptera
- Family: Tortricidae
- Genus: Proeulia
- Species: P. tricornuta

Binomial name
- Proeulia tricornuta Razowski & Pelz, 2010

Species of moth

Proeulia tricornuta is a species of moth of the family Tortricidae. It is found in the Maule Region of Chile.

The wingspan is 22 mm (0.87 in).
