= Rubus vulcanicola =

Scientific classification
- Kingdom: Plantae
- Clade: Embryophytes
- Clade: Tracheophytes
- Clade: Spermatophytes
- Clade: Angiosperms
- Clade: Eudicots
- Clade: Rosids
- Order: Rosales
- Family: Rosaceae
- Genus: Rubus
- Species: R. vulcanicola

Binomial name
- Rubus vulcanicola (Donn.Sm.) Rydb. 1913

Synonyms
- Rubus guyanensis var. vulcanicola Donn. Sm. 1897

Species of fruit and plant

Rubus vulcanicola is an uncommon Central American species of bramble. It forms a prickly perennial plant. The leaves are compound with 3 or 5 leaflets. The flowers are pink or rose-colored and the fruits are black.

The species was initially discovered on the sides of Volcán Poas in Costa Rica. It has been found only in Costa Rica and Panama.
