= Chapoania dentigera =

Scientific classification
- Kingdom: Animalia
- Phylum: Arthropoda
- Class: Insecta
- Order: Lepidoptera
- Family: Tortricidae
- Genus: Chapoania
- Species: C. dentigera

Binomial name
- Chapoania dentigera Razowski, 1999

Species of moth

Chapoania dentigera is a species of moth of the family Tortricidae. It is found in Los Lagos Region, Chile.
