= Proeulia schouteni =

Scientific classification
- Kingdom: Animalia
- Phylum: Arthropoda
- Class: Insecta
- Order: Lepidoptera
- Family: Tortricidae
- Genus: Proeulia
- Species: P. schouteni

Binomial name
- Proeulia schouteni Razowski & Pelz, 2010

Species of moth

Proeulia schouteni is a species of moth of the family Tortricidae. It is found in Chile in the Maule and Bío Bío regions.

The wingspan is 21 mm.

== Etymology ==
The species is named after Mr. Rob T. A. Schouten.
