= Proeulia talcana =

Scientific classification
- Kingdom: Animalia
- Phylum: Arthropoda
- Class: Insecta
- Order: Lepidoptera
- Family: Tortricidae
- Genus: Proeulia
- Species: P. talcana

Binomial name
- Proeulia talcana Razowski & Pelz, 2010

Species of moth

Proeulia talcana is a species of moth of the family Tortricidae. It is found in Chile's Maule Region. Its wingspan is 20 mm.
