= Accuminulia buscki =

Scientific classification
- Kingdom: Animalia
- Phylum: Arthropoda
- Clade: Pancrustacea
- Class: Insecta
- Order: Lepidoptera
- Family: Tortricidae
- Genus: Accuminulia
- Species: A. buscki

Binomial name
- Accuminulia buscki Brown, 2000

Species of moth

Accuminulia buscki is a species of moth of the family Tortricidae described by John W. Brown in 2000. It is found in Chile. The species was first recorded as an interception at the Port of New York in a shipment of grapes from Chile.

The length of the forewings is 6.5–8 mm for males and 6–7 mm for females. Adults have been recorded on wing from October to April.

== Etymology ==
The species is named in honour of microlepidopterist August Busck.
