= Ptychocroca lineabasalis =

Scientific classification
- Kingdom: Animalia
- Phylum: Arthropoda
- Class: Insecta
- Order: Lepidoptera
- Family: Tortricidae
- Genus: Ptychocroca
- Species: P. lineabasalis

Binomial name
- Ptychocroca lineabasalis Brown & Razowski, 2003

Species of moth

Ptychocroca lineabasalis is a species of moth of the family Tortricidae. It is found in Chile (Santiago Province, Maule Region, Bío Bío Region and Valparaíso Region).

Adults are on wing from October to December.
