= Proeulia lentescens =

Scientific classification
- Kingdom: Animalia
- Phylum: Arthropoda
- Class: Insecta
- Order: Lepidoptera
- Family: Tortricidae
- Genus: Proeulia
- Species: P. lentescens

Binomial name
- Proeulia lentescens Razowski, 1995

Species of moth

Proeulia lentescens is a species of moth of the family Tortricidae. It is found in Chile in Coquimbo Region and Santiago Province.
