= Proeulia onerata =

Scientific classification
- Kingdom: Animalia
- Phylum: Arthropoda
- Class: Insecta
- Order: Lepidoptera
- Family: Tortricidae
- Genus: Proeulia
- Species: P. onerata

Binomial name
- Proeulia onerata Razowski, 1995

Species of moth

Proeulia onerata is a species of moth of the family Tortricidae. It is found in Chile in Ñuble Region and Maule Region.
