= Haemateulia =

Scientific classification
- Domain: Eukaryota
- Kingdom: Animalia
- Phylum: Arthropoda
- Class: Insecta
- Order: Lepidoptera
- Family: Tortricidae
- Tribe: Euliini
- Genus: Haemateulia; Razowski, 1999

Species
- See text

Genus of tortrix moths

Haemateulia is a genus of moths belonging to the family Tortricidae.

== Species ==
- Haemateulia barrigana Razowski & Gonzlez, 2003
- Haemateulia haematitis (Meyrick, 1931)
- Haemateulia placens Razowski & Pelz, 2010
