= List of moths of South Africa =

Location of South Africa

The moths of South Africa represent about 7,000 known moth species. The moths (mostly nocturnal) and butterflies (mostly diurnal) together make up the taxonomic order Lepidoptera.

This is a list of moth species which have been recorded in South Africa. Because of the large number of species from South Africa, some families are listed on separate pages.

== Family Acrolepiidae ==
- Acrolepia canachopis Meyrick, 1913
- Acrolepia chalarodesma Meyrick, 1927
- Acrolepia gelida Meyrick, 1921
- Acrolepia trapezopa Meyrick, 1914
- Acrolepia xylophragma (Meyrick, 1926)

== Family Adelidae ==
- Adela cuneella Walsingham, 1891
- Adela droseropa Meyrick, 1921
- Adela electella (Walker, 1863)
- Adela natalensis Stainton, 1860
- Ceromitia albosparsa Janse, 1945
- Ceromitia alternipunctella (Walsingham, 1881)
- Ceromitia amphichroa Meyrick, 1908
- Ceromitia arata Meyrick, 1920
- Ceromitia benedicta Meyrick, 1918
- Ceromitia bipartita (Janse, 1945)
- Ceromitia bipectinifera Janse, 1945
- Ceromitia brevilobata (Janse, 1945)
- Ceromitia centrologa Meyrick, 1937
- Ceromitia cerochlora Meyrick, 1921
- Ceromitia crinigerella (Zeller, 1850)
- Ceromitia decepta Janse, 1945
- Ceromitia delta Janse, 1945
- Ceromitia descripta Meyrick, 1924
- Ceromitia devia (Janse, 1945)
- Ceromitia dicksoni (Janse, 1945)
- Ceromitia durbanica (Janse, 1945)
- Ceromitia elongatella (Walsingham, 1881)
- Ceromitia fuscipunctella (Janse, 1945)
- Ceromitia geminata Meyrick, 1914
- Ceromitia gigantea Janse, 1945
- Ceromitia graptosema Meyrick, 1914
- Ceromitia grisata (Janse, 1945)
- Ceromitia heteroloba (Janse, 1945)
- Ceromitia holosticta Meyrick, 1918
- Ceromitia impura (Janse, 1945)
- Ceromitia indigna (Meyrick, 1912)
- Ceromitia intermedia (Janse, 1945)
- Ceromitia laureata Meyrick, 1911
- Ceromitia libropis Meyrick, 1908
- Ceromitia melanodesma Meyrick, 1914
- Ceromitia melanostrota Meyrick, 1912
- Ceromitia mellicoma Meyrick, 1912
- Ceromitia mioclina Meyrick, 1921
- Ceromitia mitrata Meyrick, 1917
- Ceromitia monopectinifera Janse, 1945
- Ceromitia multipunctata Janse, 1945
- Ceromitia nerina Meyrick, 1912
- Ceromitia ochrotricha Meyrick, 1912
- Ceromitia palyntis Meyrick, 1908
- Ceromitia phaeocomoides Janse, 1945
- Ceromitia phyrsima Meyrick, 1911
- Ceromitia praetexta Meyrick, 1924
- Ceromitia punctulata Janse, 1945
- Ceromitia resonans Meyrick, 1918
- Ceromitia simpliciella (Janse, 1945)
- Ceromitia spatalodes Meyrick, 1920
- Ceromitia spilodesma Meyrick, 1908
- Ceromitia sporaea Meyrick, 1908
- Ceromitia stathmodes Meyrick, 1908
- Ceromitia synchroma (Janse, 1945)
- Ceromitia transtrifera Meyrick, 1912
- Ceromitia trigoniferella (Walsingham, 1881)
- Ceromitia trilobata (Janse, 1945)
- Ceromitia turpisella (Walker, 1863)
- Ceromitia tyrochlora Meyrick, 1908
- Ceromitia unguiphora (Janse, 1945)
- Ceromitia vansoni Janse, 1945
- Ceromitia wahlbergi Zeller, 1852
- Ceromitia xanthosoma Meyrick, 1917

== Family Alucitidae ==
- Alucita acalyptra (Meyrick, 1913)
- Alucita brachyzona (Meyrick, 1920)
- Alucita butleri Wallengren, 1875
- Alucita capensis Felder & Rogenhofer, 1875
- Alucita certifica (Meyrick, 1909)
- Alucita crococyma (Meyrick, 1937)
- Alucita ferruginea Walsingham, 1881
- Alucita habrophila (Meyrick, 1920)
- Alucita ithycypha (Meyrick, 1927)
- Alucita libraria (Meyrick, 1911)
- Alucita ochriprota (Hering, 1917)
- Alucita phanerarcha (Meyrick, 1924)
- Alucita photaula (Meyrick, 1918)
- Alucita spicifera (Meyrick, 1911)
- Alucita tesserata (Meyrick, 1918)
- Microschismus antennatus T. B. Fletcher, 1909
- Microschismus cymatias Meyrick, 1918
- Microschismus fortis (Walsingham, 1881)
- Microschismus premnias Meyrick, 1913
- Microschismus reginus Ustjuzhanin & Kovtunovich, 2011
- Microschismus sceletias Meyrick, 1911
- Microschismus sterkfontein Ustjuzhanin & Kovtunovich, 2011

== Family Anomoeotidae ==
- Anomoeotes levis Felder, 1888
- Anomoeotes nigrivenosus Butler, 1893
- Dianeura goochii Butler, 1888

== Family Arctiidae ==
About 239 species - see: List of moths of South Africa (Arctiidae)

== Family Autostichidae ==
- Diophila bathrota (Meyrick, 1911)
- Hesperesta rhyodes (Meyrick, 1909)
- Holcopogon tucki Vives Moreno, 1999
- Oegoconia meledantis (Meyrick, 1921)
- Oegoconia syndesma Meyrick, 1926
- Pachnistis craniota (Meyrick, 1913)
- Procometis acharma Meyrick, 1908
- Procometis limitata Meyrick, 1911
- Procometis milvina Meyrick, 1914
- Procometis ochricilia Meyrick, 1921
- Procometis oxypora Meyrick, 1908
- Procometis terrena Meyrick, 1908
- Symmoca crocodesma Meyrick, 1911

== Family Batrachedridae ==
- Batrachedra epombra Meyrick, 1914
- Batrachedra granosa Meyrick, 1911
- Batrachedra heliota Meyrick, 1913
- Batrachedra isochtha Meyrick, 1914
- Batrachedra microbias Meyrick, 1914
- Batrachedra oemias Meyrick, 1909
- Batrachedra phaneropa Meyrick, 1914
- Batrachedra saurota Meyrick, 1911
- Batrachedra stegodyphobia Walsingham, 1903
- Enscepastra lathraea Meyrick, 1920
- Enscepastra longirostris Meyrick, 1926
- Enscepastra plagiopa Meyrick, 1920
- Idioglossa bigemma Walsingham, 1881

== Family Bedelliidae ==
- Bedellia cathareuta Meyrick, 1911
- Bedellia somnulentella (Zeller, 1847)

== Family Bombycidae ==
- Bombyx mori (Linnaeus, 1758)
- Ocinara ficicola (Westwood & Ormerod, 1889)
- Racinoa ianthe (Druce, 1887)
- Racinoa pallicornis Strand, 1910
- Racinoa signicosta Strand, 1910

== Family Brachodidae ==
- Atractoceros albiciliata (Walsingham, 1891)
- Atractoceros xanthoprocta (Meyrick, 1914)
- Brachodes infandus (Meyrick, 1920)
- Brachodes metaspilus (Meyrick, 1926)
- Brachodes nycteropis (Meyrick, 1920)
- Brachodes quiris (Felder & Rogenhofer, 1875)
- Nigilgia albitogata (Walsingham, 1891)
- Nigilgia eucallynta (Meyrick, 1937)
- Nigilgia pseliota (Meyrick, 1920)
- Phycodes punctata Walsingham, 1891

== Family Brahmaeidae ==
- Dactyloceras widenmanni (Karsch, 1895)
- Spiramiopsis comma Hampson, 1901

== Family Bucculatricidae ==
- Bucculatrix agilis Meyrick, 1920
- Bucculatrix amara Meyrick, 1913
- Bucculatrix anticolona Meyrick, 1913
- Bucculatrix dulcis Meyrick, 1913
- Bucculatrix edocta Meyrick, 1921
- Bucculatrix facilis Meyrick, 1911
- Bucculatrix galeodes Meyrick, 1913
- Bucculatrix inchoata Meyrick, 1913
- Bucculatrix lenis Meyrick, 1913
- Bucculatrix melipecta Meyrick, 1914
- Bucculatrix monelpis Meyrick, 1928
- Bucculatrix ochromeris Meyrick, 1928
- Bucculatrix porthmisa Meyrick, 1908
- Bucculatrix praecipua Meyrick, 1918
- Bucculatrix quieta Meyrick, 1913
- Leucoedemia ingens (Scoble & Scholtz, 1984)

== Family Carposinidae ==
- Carposina autologa Meyrick, 1910
- Carposina brachycentra Meyrick, 1914
- Carposina conobathra Meyrick, 1928
- Carposina exsanguis Meyrick, 1918
- Carposina impavida Meyrick, 1913
- Carposina irata Meyrick, 1914
- Carposina proconsularis Meyrick, 1921
- Carposina siturga Meyrick, 1912
- Carposina socors Meyrick, 1928
- Carposina subselliata Meyrick, 1921
- Carposina thermurga Meyrick, 1929

== Family Cecidosidae ==
- Scyrotis athleta Meyrick, 1909
- Scyrotis granosa (Meyrick, 1912)
- Scyrotis kochi Mey, 2007
- Scyrotis pulleni Mey, 2007
- Scyrotis trivialis (Meyrick, 1913)

== Family Choreutidae ==
- Brenthia leucatoma Meyrick, 1918
- Brenthia virginalis Meyrick, 1912
- Choreutis aegyptiaca (Zeller, 1867)
- Choreutis entechna (Meyrick, 1920)
- Choreutis gratiosa (Meyrick, 1911)
- Choreutis plectodes (Meyrick, 1921)
- Tebenna micalis (Mann, 1857)

== Family Coleophoridae ==
- Anathyrsa macroxyla Meyrick, 1920
- Augasma nidifica Meyrick, 1912
- Blastobasis byrsodepta Meyrick, 1913
- Blastobasis determinata Meyrick, 1921
- Blastobasis egens Meyrick, 1918
- Blastobasis fatigata Meyrick, 1914
- Blastobasis industria Meyrick, 1913
- Blastobasis millicentae Adamski, 2010
- Blastobasis taricheuta Meyrick, 1909
- Calosima arguta (Meyrick, 1918)
- Coleophora acmura Meyrick, 1914
- Coleophora aphanombra Meyrick, 1913
- Coleophora diffusa Meyrick, 1913
- Coleophora efflua Meyrick, 1911
- Coleophora eremodes Meyrick, 1912
- Coleophora halmodes Meyrick, 1911
- Coleophora illustrata Meyrick, 1913
- Coleophora intensa Meyrick, 1913
- Coleophora leucaula Meyrick, 1911
- Coleophora megaloptila Meyrick, 1909
- Coleophora niphocrossa Meyrick, 1920
- Coleophora ordinaria Meyrick, 1913
- Coleophora orphnoceros Meyrick, 1937
- Coleophora oxyphaea Meyrick, 1913
- Coleophora presbytica Meyrick, 1921
- Coleophora scaleuta Meyrick, 1911
- Coleophora scariphota Meyrick, 1911
- Coleophora terenaula Meyrick, 1927
- Coleophora textoria Meyrick, 1921
- Coleophora triflua Meyrick, 1911
- Holcocera extensa (Meyrick, 1918)
- Holcocera irroratella (Walsingham, 1891)

== Family Copromorphidae ==
- Copromorpha aeruginea Meyrick, 1917
- Rhynchoferella syncentra (Meyrick, 1916)

== Family Cosmopterigidae ==
- Alloclita paraphracta Meyrick, 1914
- Alloclita xylodesma Meyrick, 1911
- Allotalanta clonomicta Meyrick, 1927
- Anatrachyntis rileyi (Walsingham, 1882)
- Anatrachyntis tripola (Meyrick, 1909)
- Ascalenia albitergis Meyrick, 1926
- Ascalenia melanogastra (Meyrick, 1918)
- Ascalenia nudicornis (Meyrick, 1913)
- Ascalenia pulverata (Meyrick, 1913)
- Ascalenia staurocentra (Meyrick, 1915)
- Axiarcha discosema Meyrick, 1921
- Chalcocolona cyananthes (Meyrick, 1911)
- Cnemidolophus lavernellus Walsingham, 1881
- Cosmopterix ancistraea Meyrick, 1913
- Cosmopterix antichorda Meyrick, 1909
- Cosmopterix bactrophora Meyrick, 1908
- Cosmopterix callinympha Meyrick, 1913
- Cosmopterix circe Meyrick, 1921
- Cosmopterix cleophanes Meyrick, 1937
- Cosmopterix cognita Walsingham, 1891
- Cosmopterix diplozona Meyrick, 1921
- Cosmopterix emmolybda Meyrick, 1914
- Cosmopterix macroglossa Meyrick, 1913
- Cosmopterix oxyglossa Meyrick, 1909
- Cosmopterix scaligera Meyrick, 1909
- Cosmopterix tabellaria Meyrick, 1908
- Cosmopterix tetrophthalma Meyrick, 1921
- Dorodoca eometalla Meyrick, 1926
- Erechthiodes audax Meyrick, 1914
- Eteobalea pentagama Meyrick, 1928
- Eteobalea phanoptila Meyrick, 1911
- Eteobalea quinquecristata (Walsingham, 1891)
- Gibeauxiella genitrix (Meyrick, 1927)
- Gisilia antidesma (Meyrick, 1913)
- Gisilia cardinata (Meyrick, 1918)
- Gisilia conformata (Meyrick, 1921)
- Gisilia sclerodes (Meyrick, 1909)
- Gisilia stagnans (Meyrick, 1921)
- Hyalochna allevata Meyrick, 1918
- Ischnobathra balanobola Meyrick, 1937
- Ischnobathra dormiens Meyrick, 1937
- Labdia caulota Meyrick, 1918
- Labdia diophanes Meyrick, 1927
- Limnaecia chlorodeta Meyrick, 1928
- Limnaecia chloronephes Meyrick, 1924
- Limnaecia effulgens Meyrick, 1918
- Limnaecia eretmota Meyrick, 1909
- Limnaecia ichnographa Meyrick, 1908
- Limnaecia neurogramma Meyrick, 1909
- Limnaecia recidiva Meyrick, 1911
- Limnaecia semisecta Meyrick, 1928
- Macrobathra anisodora Meyrick, 1924
- Macrobathra recrepans Meyrick, 1926
- Melanozestis heterodesma Meyrick, 1930
- Parathystas porphyrantha Meyrick, 1913
- Pycnagorastis tanyopa Meyrick, 1937
- Pyroderces narcota (Meyrick, 1909)
- Stagmatophora basanistis Meyrick, 1909
- Stagmatophora phalacra Meyrick, 1909
- Stagmatophora pilana Meyrick, 1913
- Stagmatophora trimitra Meyrick, 1913
- Stilbosis antibathra (Meyrick, 1914)
- Streptothyris tanyacta Meyrick, 1918

== Family Cossidae ==
- Aethalopteryx forsteri (Clench, 1959)
- Aethalopteryx pindarus (Fawcett, 1916)
- Aethalopteryx squameus (Distant, 1902)
- Aethalopteryx tristis (Gaede, 1915)
- Alophonotus rauanus (Strand, 1909)
- Arctiocossus antargyreus Felder, 1874
- Arctiocossus danieli Clench, 1959
- Arctiocossus impeditus (Walker, 1865)
- Arctiocossus ligatus (Walker, 1865)
- Arctiocossus tessellatus Clench, 1959
- Azygophleps asylas (Cramer, 1777)
- Azygophleps atrifasciata Hampson, 1910
- Azygophleps cooksoni Pinhey, 1968
- Azygophleps inclusa (Walker, 1856)
- Azygophleps leopardina Distant, 1902
- Azygophleps pusilla (Walker, 1856)
- Brachylia eutelia Clench, 1959
- Brachylia incanescens (Butler, 1875)
- Brachylia terebroides Felder, 1874
- Coryphodema albifasciata Hampson, 1910
- Coryphodema tristis (Drury, 1782)
- Cossus seineri Grünberg, 1910
- Eulophonotus myrmeleon Felder, 1874
- Macrocossus coelebs Clench, 1959
- Macrocossus toluminus (Druce, 1887)
- Nomima cyanoscia (Meyrick, 1918)
- Nomima subnigrata (Meyrick, 1917)
- Oreocossus occidentalis Strand, 1913
- Pecticossus castaneus Gaede, 1929
- Phragmataecia andarana Clench, 1959
- Phragmataecia boisduvalii (Herrich-Schäffer, 1854)
- Phragmataecia innominata Dalla Torre, 1923
- Phragmataecia irrorata Hampson, 1910
- Phragmataecia okovangae Clench, 1959
- Pseudurgis leucosema Meyrick, 1914
- Pseudurgis nephelicta Meyrick, 1913
- Pseudurgis ochrolychna Meyrick, 1914
- Pseudurgis poliastis (Meyrick, 1937)
- Pseudurgis polychorda Meyrick, 1913
- Pseudurgis protracta Meyrick, 1924
- Pseudurgis sciocolona Meyrick, 1914
- Pseudurgis scutifera Meyrick, 1912
- Pseudurgis tectonica Meyrick, 1908
- Pseudurgis undulata (Meyrick, 1911)
- Rethona strigosa Walker, 1855
- Strigocossus capensis (Walker, 1856)
- Strigocossus ochricosta (T. B. Fletcher, 1968)
- Xyleutes dictyotephra Clench, 1959
- Xyleutes sjoestedti (Aurivillius, 1900)
- Xyleutes vosseleri Gaede, 1929
- Zeuzera coffeae Nietner, 1861
- Zeuzera sponda Wallengren, 1875

== Family Crambidae ==
About 407 species - see: List of moths of South Africa (Crambidae)

== Family Drepanidae ==
- Aethiopsestis austrina Watson, 1965
- Aethiopsestis echinata Watson, 1965
- Epicampoptera notialis Watson, 1965
- Marplena designina Lane, 1973
- Negera natalensis (Felder, 1874)

== Family Dudgeoneidae ==
- Dudgeonea leucosticta Hampson, 1900

== Family Elachistidae ==
- Agonopterix communis (Meyrick, 1920)
- Agonopterix compacta (Meyrick, 1914)
- Agonopterix crypsicosma (Meyrick, 1920)
- Agonopterix dryocrates (Meyrick, 1921)
- Agonopterix glyphidopa (Meyrick, 1828)
- Agonopterix goughi (Bradley, 1958)
- Agonopterix grammatopa (Meyrick, 1920)
- Agonopterix homogenes (Meyrick, 1920)
- Agonopterix melanarcha (Meyrick, 1913)
- Agonopterix neoxesta (Meyrick, 1918)
- Agonopterix trimenella (Walsingham, 1881)
- Colonophora ictifera Meyrick, 1937
- Cryptolechia castella (Zeller, 1852)
- Cryptolechia straminella (Zeller, 1852)
- Depressaria clausulata Meyrick, 1911
- Depressaria orthobathra Meyrick, 1918
- Depressaria panurga Meyrick, 1920
- Depressaria prospicua Meyrick, 1914
- Depressaria rhodoscelis Meyrick, 1920
- Elachista chelonitis Meyrick, 1909
- Elachista crocogastra Meyrick, 1908
- Elachista gypsophila Meyrick, 1911
- Elachista inscia (Meyrick, 1913)
- Elachista justificata Meyrick, 1926
- Elachista merimnaea Meyrick, 1920
- Elachista nymphaea Meyrick, 1911
- Elachista sparsula Meyrick, 1921
- Ethmia circumdatella (Walker, 1863)
- Ethmia coscineutis Meyrick, 1912
- Ethmia dactylia Meyrick, 1912
- Ethmia glandifera Meyrick, 1918
- Ethmia hamaxastra Meyrick, 1930
- Ethmia leucocirrha Meyrick, 1926
- Ethmia livida (Zeller, 1852)
- Ethmia oculigera (Möschler, 1883)
- Ethmia pericentrota Meyrick, 1926
- Ethmia rhomboidella Walsingham, 1897
- Ethmia sabiella (Felder & Rogenhofer, 1875)
- Eutorna diluvialis Meyrick, 1913
- Haplochrois ganota Meyrick, 1911
- Haplochrois halans Meyrick, 1924
- Haplochrois hysterota (Meyrick, 1918)
- Ischnopsis angustella Walsingham, 1881
- Ischnopsis melanogma (Meyrick, 1908)
- Ischnopsis pilifera (Meyrick, 1921)
- Martyrhilda melanarga (Meyrick, 1913)
- Microcolona omphalias Meyrick, 1913
- Microcolona pantomima Meyrick, 1917
- Myrrhinitis sporeuta Meyrick, 1913
- Orophia ammopleura (Meyrick, 1920)
- Orophia eariasella (Walker, 1864)
- Orophia haeresiella (Wallengren, 1875)
- Orophia ochroxyla (Meyrick, 1937)
- Orophia roseoflavida (Walsingham, 1881)
- Orophia tetrasticta (Meyrick, 1917)
- Orophia tranquilla (Meyrick, 1927)
- Orophia transfuga (Meyrick, 1911)
- Orophia xanthosarca (Meyrick, 1917)
- Pauroptila galenitis Meyrick, 1913
- Perittia aganopa (Meyrick, 1911)
- Perittia nimbifera (Meyrick, 1913)
- Perittia secutrix (Meyrick, 1914)
- Phthinostoma infumata Meyrick, 1914
- Phthinostoma pachyzona Meyrick, 1921
- Pisinidea exsuperans Meyrick, 1920
- Porotica astragalis Meyrick, 1913
- Stenoma dicentra Meyrick, 1913
- Stenoma modicola Meyrick, 1911
- Stenoma reticens Meyrick, 1917
- Stenoma simulatrix Meyrick, 1914
- Stenoma stolida Meyrick, 1911
- Trachydora iocharis Meyrick, 1918
- Trachydora rhachitis Meyrick, 1913
- Trachydora scandalotis Meyrick, 1921

== Family Epermeniidae ==
- Epermenia conioptila Meyrick, 1921
- Epermenia criticodes Meyrick, 1913
- Epermenia ithycentra Meyrick, 1926
- Epermenia ochrodesma Meyrick, 1913
- Epermenia proserga Meyrick, 1913
- Ochromolopis praefumata (Meyrick, 1911)
- Temeluchella xeropa (Meyrick, 1909)

== Family Epipyropidae ==
- Epipyrops fulvipunctata Distant, 1913

== Family Eriocottidae ==
- Compsoctena aedifica (Meyrick, 1908)
- Compsoctena africanella (Strand, 1909)
- Compsoctena agria (Meyrick, 1909)
- Compsoctena autoderma (Meyrick, 1914)
- Compsoctena brachyctenis (Meyrick, 1909)
- Compsoctena connexalis (Walker, 1863)
- Compsoctena cyclatma (Meyrick, 1908)
- Compsoctena delocrossa (Meyrick, 1921)
- Compsoctena dermatodes (Meyrick, 1914)
- Compsoctena expers (Meyrick, 1911)
- Compsoctena fossoria (Meyrick, 1920)
- Compsoctena furciformis (Meyrick, 1921)
- Compsoctena isopetra (Meyrick, 1921)
- Compsoctena lycophanes (Meyrick, 1924)
- Compsoctena melitoploca (Meyrick, 1927)
- Compsoctena microctenis (Meyrick, 1914)
- Compsoctena numeraria (Meyrick, 1914)
- Compsoctena ochrastis (Meyrick, 1937)
- Compsoctena ostracitis (Meyrick, 1913)
- Compsoctena primella Zeller, 1852
- Compsoctena psammosticha (Meyrick, 1921)
- Compsoctena quassa (Meyrick, 1921)
- Compsoctena rudis (Meyrick, 1921)
- Compsoctena scriba (Meyrick, 1921)
- Compsoctena spilophanes (Meyrick, 1921)
- Compsoctena talarodes (Meyrick, 1927)
- Compsoctena terrestris (Meyrick, 1914)
- Eucryptogona secularis Meyrick, 1918

== Family Eupterotidae ==
- Bantuana cregoei Distant, 1906
- Camerunia flava Aurivillius, 1904
- Cyrtojana trilineata Aurivillius, 1911
- Hemijana griseola Rothschild, 1917
- Hemijana subrosea (Aurivillius, 1893)
- Hibrildes crawshayi Butler, 1896
- Hoplojana rhodoptera (Gerstaecker, 1871)

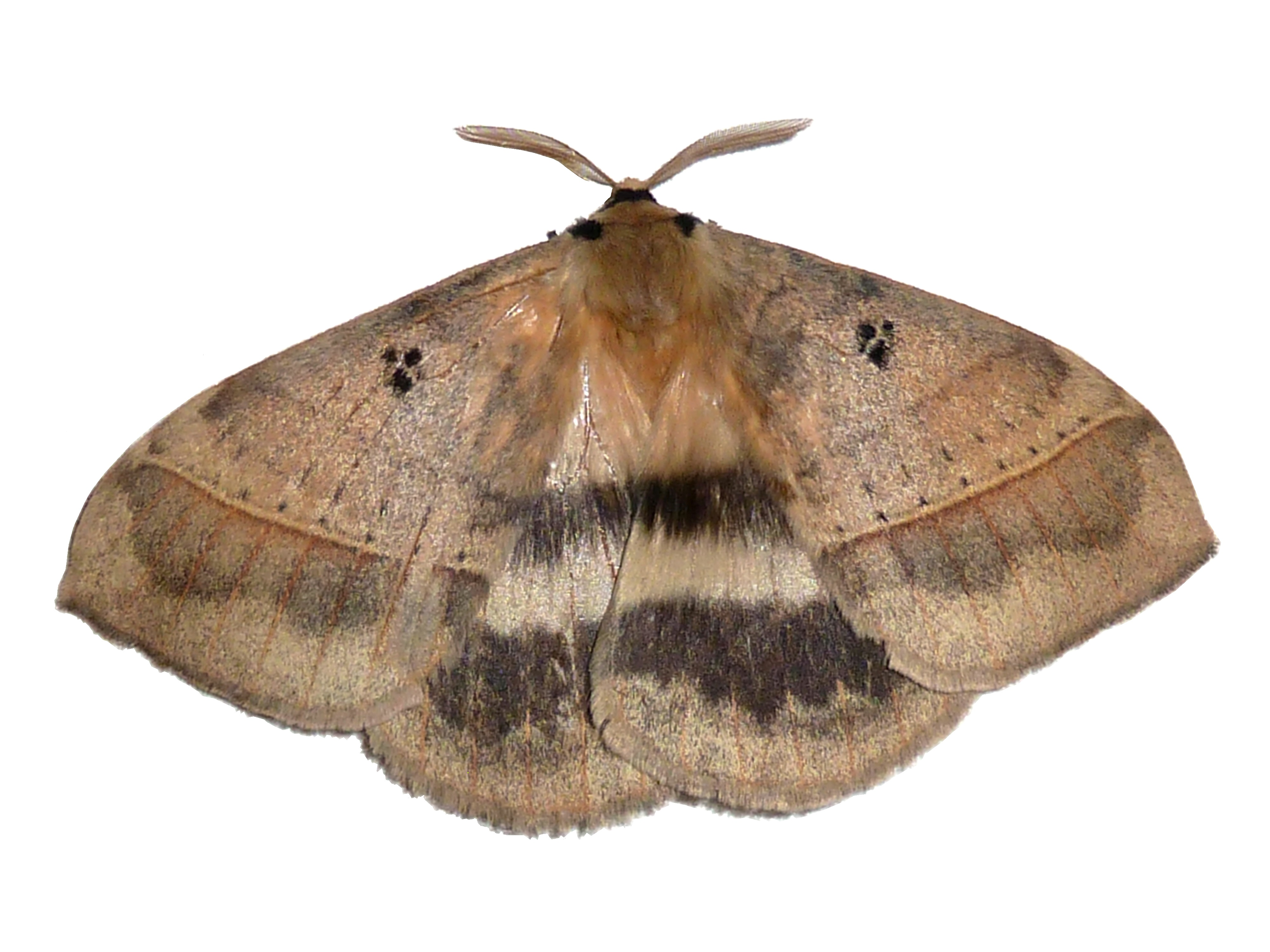
Jana eurymas

- Jana eurymas Herrich-Schäffer, 1854
- Jana nigristriata Janse, 1915
- Jana tantalus Herrich-Schäffer, 1854
- Janomima dannfelti (Aurivillius, 1893)
- Janomima mariana (White, 1843)
- Lichenopteryx despecta Felder, 1874
- Marmaroplegma conspersa Aurivillius, 1921
- Marmaroplegma paragarda Wallengren, 1860
- Marmaroplegma unicolor Janse, 1915
- Paraphyllalia degenera (Walker, 1855)
- Phiala albidorsata Gaede, 1927
- Phiala bistrigata Aurivillius, 1901
- Phiala costipuncta (Herrich-Schäffer, 1855)
- Phiala crassistriga Strand, 1911
- Phiala dasypoda Wallengren, 1860
- Phiala flavipennis Wallengren, 1875
- Phiala hologramma (Aurivillius, 1904)
- Phiala incana Distant, 1897
- Phiala marshalli Aurivillius, 1904
- Phiala nigrolineata Aurivillius, 1903
- Phiala niveociliata Strand, 1911
- Phiala polita Distant, 1897
- Phiala pretoriana Wichgraf, 1908
- Phiala pseudatomaria Strand, 1911
- Phiala pulverea Distant, 1903
- Phiala similis Aurivillius, 1911
- Phiala simplex Aurivillius, 1904
- Phiala wichgrafi Strand, 1911
- Phyllalia alboradiata Aurivillius, 1911
- Phyllalia flavicostata Fawcett, 1903
- Phyllalia patens (Boisduval, 1847)
- Phyllalia thunbergii (Boisduval, 1847)
- Phyllalia umbripennis Strand, 1911
- Phyllalia valida (Felder, 1874)
- Phyllalia ziczac (Strand, 1911)
- Poloma angulata Walker, 1855
- Poloma castanea Aurivillius, 1901
- Poloma nigromaculata Aurivillius, 1893
- Pterocerota virginea Hampson, 1905
- Rhabdosia patagiata (Aurivillius, 1911)
- Rhabdosia vaninia (Stoll, 1781)
- Schistissa uniformis Aurivillius, 1901
- Stenoglene bicolor (Distant, 1897)
- Stenoglene decellei Dall'Asta & Poncin, 1980
- Stenoglene hilaris Felder, 1874
- Stenoglene livingstonensis (Strand, 1909)
- Stenoglene nahor Druce, 1896
- Stenoglene obtusus (Walker, 1864)
- Stenoglene pira Druce, 1896
- Stenoglene roseus (Druce, 1886)
- Striphnopteryx edulis (Boisduval, 1847)
- Tissanga pretoriae (Distant, 1892)

== Family Gelechiidae ==
About 502 species - see: List of moths of South Africa (Gelechiidae)

== Family Geometridae ==
About 976 species - see: List of moths of South Africa (Geometridae)

== Family Glyphipterigidae ==
- Chrysocentris chrysozona (Meyrick, 1921)
- Chrysocentris urania Meyrick, 1920
- Glyphipterix amphipeda Meyrick, 1920
- Glyphipterix argophracta Meyrick, 1926
- Glyphipterix bohemani (Zeller, 1852)
- Glyphipterix callithea Meyrick, 1921
- Glyphipterix climacaspis Meyrick, 1920
- Glyphipterix decachrysa Meyrick, 1918
- Glyphipterix diplotoxa Meyrick, 1920
- Glyphipterix ditiorana Walker, 1863
- Glyphipterix grapholithoides (Walsingham, 1891)
- Glyphipterix idiomorpha Meyrick, 1917
- Glyphipterix medica Meyrick, 1911
- Glyphipterix ortholeuca Meyrick, 1921
- Glyphipterix oxytricha Meyrick, 1928
- Glyphipterix stelucha Meyrick, 1909
- Tetracmanthes astrocosma Meyrick, 1925
- Ussara polyastra Meyrick, 1937

== Family Gracillariidae ==
- Acrocercops chrysophylli Vári, 1961
- Acrocercops combreticola Vári, 1961
- Acrocercops ficina Vári, 1961
- Acrocercops gossypii Vári, 1961
- Acrocercops heterodoxa Meyrick, 1912
- Acrocercops ochnifolii Vári, 1961
- Acrocercops punctulata Walsingham, 1891
- Acrocercops syzygiena Vári, 1961
- Acrocercops terminalina Vári, 1961
- Amblyptila cynanchi Vári, 1961
- Amblyptila strophanthina Vári, 1961
- Aristaea bathracma (Meyrick, 1912)
- Aristaea eurygramma Vári, 1961
- Aristaea onychota (Meyrick, 1908)
- Aristaea thalassias (Meyrick, 1880)
- Aspilapteryx filifera (Meyrick, 1912)
- Aspilapteryx grypota (Meyrick, 1914)
- Aspilapteryx seriata (Meyrick, 1912)
- Callicercops triceros (Meyrick, 1926)
- Caloptilia aurita Triberti, 1989
- Caloptilia azaleella (Brants, 1913)
- Caloptilia cataractias (Meyrick, 1921)
- Caloptilia celtina Vári, 1961
- Caloptilia chrysoplaca Vári, 1961
- Caloptilia corrugata (Meyrick, 1918)
- Caloptilia dicksoni Vári, 1961
- Caloptilia isotoma (Meyrick, 1914)
- Caloptilia leptophanes (Meyrick, 1928)
- Caloptilia leptospila Vári, 1961
- Caloptilia macropleura (Meyrick, 1932)
- Caloptilia meyricki Vári, 1961
- Caloptilia octopunctata (Turner, 1894)
- Caloptilia pentaplaca (Meyrick, 1911)
- Caloptilia poecilostola Vári, 1961
- Caloptilia porphyranthes (Meyrick, 1921)
- Caloptilia prosticta (Meyrick, 1909)
- Caloptilia pyrrhochroma Vári, 1961
- Caloptilia rhusina Vári, 1961
- Caloptilia sapina Vári, 1961
- Caloptilia semnophanes (Meyrick, 1918)
- Caloptilia syngenica Vári, 1961
- Caloptilia titanitis (Meyrick, 1921)
- Caloptilia vibrans (Meyrick, 1918)
- Caloptilia vicinola Vári, 1961
- Caloptilia xanthocephala Vári, 1961
- Caloptilia xanthochiria Vári, 1961
- Cameraria hexalobina (Vári, 1961)
- Cameraria varii de Prins, 2012
- Conopobathra carbunculata (Meyrick, 1912)
- Conopobathra geraea Vári, 1961
- Conopobathra gravissima (Meyrick, 1912)
- Conopomorpha chionosema Vári, 1961
- Conopomorpha euphanes Vári, 1961
- Conopomorpha fustigera (Meyrick, 1928)
- Conopomorphina aptata (Meyrick, 1914)
- Conopomorphina ochnivora Vári, 1961
- Corethrovalva allophylina Vári, 1961
- Corethrovalva goniosema Vári, 1961
- Corethrovalva paraplesia Vári, 1961
- Corythoxestis cyanolampra Vári, 1961
- Cryptolectica capnodecta Vári, 1961
- Cryptolectica euryphanta (Meyrick, 1911)
- Cryptolectica monodecta (Meyrick, 1912)
- Cuphodes diospyri Vári, 1961
- Cuphodes dolichocera Vári, 1961
- Cuphodes leucocera Vári, 1961
- Cuphodes melanostola (Meyrick, 1918)
- Dialectica carcharota (Meyrick, 1912)
- Dialectica columellina (Vári, 1961)
- Dialectica cordiaecola Vári, 1961
- Dialectica ehretiae (Vári, 1961)
- Dialectica galactozona Vári, 1961
- Dialectica odontosema (Vári, 1961)
- Dialectica pavonicola (Vári, 1961)
- Dialectica praegemina (Meyrick, 1917)
- Dialectica pyramidota (Meyrick, 1918)
- Dialectica trigonidota (Vári, 1961)
- Diphtheroptila brideliae Vári, 1961
- Diphtheroptila oxyloga (Meyrick, 1928)
- Ectropina citricula (Meyrick, 1912)
- Ectropina ligata (Meyrick, 1912)
- Ectropina sclerochitoni Vári, 1961
- Epicephala haplodoxa Vári, 1961
- Epicephala homostola Vári, 1961
- Epicephala pelopepla Vári, 1961
- Epicephala pyrrhogastra Meyrick, 1908
- Epicephala tephrostola Vári, 1961
- Euspilapteryx crypta Vári, 1961
- Graphiocephala barbitias (Meyrick, 1909)
- Graphiocephala polysticha Vári, 1961
- Graphiocephala strigifera Vári, 1961
- Lamprolectica apicistrigata (Walsingham, 1891)
- Leucocercops dasmophora (Meyrick, 1908)
- Liocrobyla tephrosiae Vári, 1961
- Macarostola flora (Meyrick, 1926)
- Macarostola noellineae Vári, 2002
- Metacercops praestricta (Meyrick, 1918)
- Metriochroa pergulariae Vári, 1961
- Metriochroa tylophorae Vári, 1961
- Oligoneurina ficicola Vári, 1961
- Pareclectis adelospila Vári, 1961
- Pareclectis invita (Meyrick, 1912)
- Pareclectis leucosticha Vári, 1961
- Pareclectis prionota (Meyrick, 1928)
- Phodoryctis dolichophila (Vári, 1961)
- Phodoryctis thrypticosema (Vári, 1961)
- Phyllocnistis citrella Stainton, 1856
- Phyllocnistis pharetrucha Meyrick, 1921
- Phyllocnistis saligna (Zeller, 1839)
- Phyllonorycter anchistea (Vári, 1961)
- Phyllonorycter brachylaenae (Vári, 1961)
- Phyllonorycter didymopa (Vári, 1961)
- Phyllonorycter dombeyae de Prins, 2012
- Phyllonorycter encaeria (Meyrick, 1911)
- Phyllonorycter grewiaecola (Vári, 1961)
- Phyllonorycter grewiella (Vári, 1961)
- Phyllonorycter hibiscina (Vári, 1961)
- Phyllonorycter lantanae (Vári, 1961)
- Phyllonorycter loxozona (Meyrick, 1936)
- Phyllonorycter melanosparta (Meyrick, 1912)
- Phyllonorycter melhaniae (Meyrick, 1912)
- Phyllonorycter pavoniae (Vári, 1961)
- Phyllonorycter rhynchosiae (Vári, 1961)
- Phyllonorycter tsavensis de Prins, 2012
- Pleiomorpha dystacta Vári, 1961
- Pleiomorpha eumeces Vári, 1961
- Pleiomorpha habrogramma Vári, 1961
- Pleiomorpha homotypa Vári, 1961
- Pleiomorpha symmetra Vári, 1961
- Pogonocephala veneranda (Meyrick, 1909)
- Polydema hormophora (Meyrick, 1912)
- Polydema vansoni Vári, 1961
- Polysoma clarki Vári, 1961
- Polysoma lithochrysa (Meyrick, 1930)
- Porphyrosela gautengi de Prins, 2012
- Porphyrosela teramni Vári, 1961
- Schedocercops maeruae Vári, 1961
- Semnocera procellaris (Meyrick, 1914)
- Spulerina atactodesma Vári, 1961
- Spulerina catapasta Vári, 1961
- Spulerina hexalocha (Meyrick, 1912)
- Spulerina lochmaea Vári, 1961
- Spulerina marmarodes Vári, 1961
- Stomphastis aphrocyma (Meyrick, 1918)
- Stomphastis cardamitis (Meyrick, 1921)
- Stomphastis conflua (Meyrick, 1914)
- Stomphastis crotoniphila Vári, 1961
- Stomphastis crotonis Vári, 1961
- Stomphastis dodonaeae Vári, 1961
- Stomphastis eugrapta Vári, 1961
- Stomphastis mixograpta Vári, 1961
- Stomphastis rorkei Vári, 1961
- Stomphastis thraustica (Meyrick, 1908)
- Stomphastis tremina Vári, 1961
- Systoloneura randiae Vári, 1961
- Telamoptilia geyeri (Vári, 1961)

== Family Heliozelidae ==
- Antispila argyrozona Meyrick, 1918
- Antispila salutans Meyrick, 1921

== Family Hepialidae ==
- Afrotheora argentimaculata Nielsen & Scoble, 1986
- Afrotheora minirhodaula Nielsen & Scoble, 1986
- Afrotheora rhodaula (Meyrick, 1926)
- Afrotheora thermodes (Meyrick, 1921)
- Antihepialus antarcticus (Wallengren, 1860)
- Antihepialus capeneri Janse, 1948
- Antihepialus vansoni (Janse, 1942)
- Eudalaca albiplumis (Warren, 1914)
- Eudalaca albistriata (Hampson, 1910)
- Eudalaca ammon (Wallengren, 1860)
- Eudalaca amphiarma (Meyrick, 1926)
- Eudalaca aurifuscalis (Janse, 1942)
- Eudalaca bacotii (Quail, 1900)
- Eudalaca cretata (Distant, 1897)
- Eudalaca crossosema (Meyrick, 1921)
- Eudalaca crudeni (Janse, 1942)
- Eudalaca eriogastra (Meyrick, 1921)
- Eudalaca exul (Herrich-Schäffer, [1853])
- Eudalaca gutterata (Janse, 1942)
- Eudalaca hololeuca (Hampson, 1910)
- Eudalaca homoterma (Meyrick, 1921)
- Eudalaca ibex (Wallengren, 1860)
- Eudalaca infumata (Janse, 1942)
- Eudalaca isorrhoa (Meyrick, 1921)
- Eudalaca leniflua (Janse, 1942)
- Eudalaca leucocyma (Hampson, 1910)
- Eudalaca leucophaea (Janse, 1919)
- Eudalaca limbopunctata (Gaede, 1930)
- Eudalaca minuscula (Janse, 1942)
- Eudalaca nomaqua (Walker, 1856)
- Eudalaca orthocosma (Janse, 1942)
- Eudalaca rivula (Janse, 1942)
- Eudalaca rufescens (Hampson, 1910)
- Eudalaca semicana (Janse, 1919)
- Eudalaca troglodytis (Janse, 1919)
- Eudalaca vaporalis (Meyrick, 1921)
- Eudalaca vindex (Meyrick, 1939)
- Gorgopis annulosa Gaede, 1930
- Gorgopis armillata Meyrick, 1921
- Gorgopis auratilis Janse, 1919
- Gorgopis aurifuscata Janse, 1942
- Gorgopis butlerii (Dewitz, 1881)
- Gorgopis caffra Walker, 1856
- Gorgopis centaurica Meyrick, 1921
- Gorgopis cochlias Janse, 1942
- Gorgopis crudeni Janse, 1919
- Gorgopis furcata Janse, 1942
- Gorgopis fuscalis Janse, 1919
- Gorgopis grisescens Gaede, 1930
- Gorgopis hunti Janse, 1942
- Gorgopis inornata Janse, 1942
- Gorgopis intervallata Warren, 1914
- Gorgopis leucopetala Meyrick, 1921

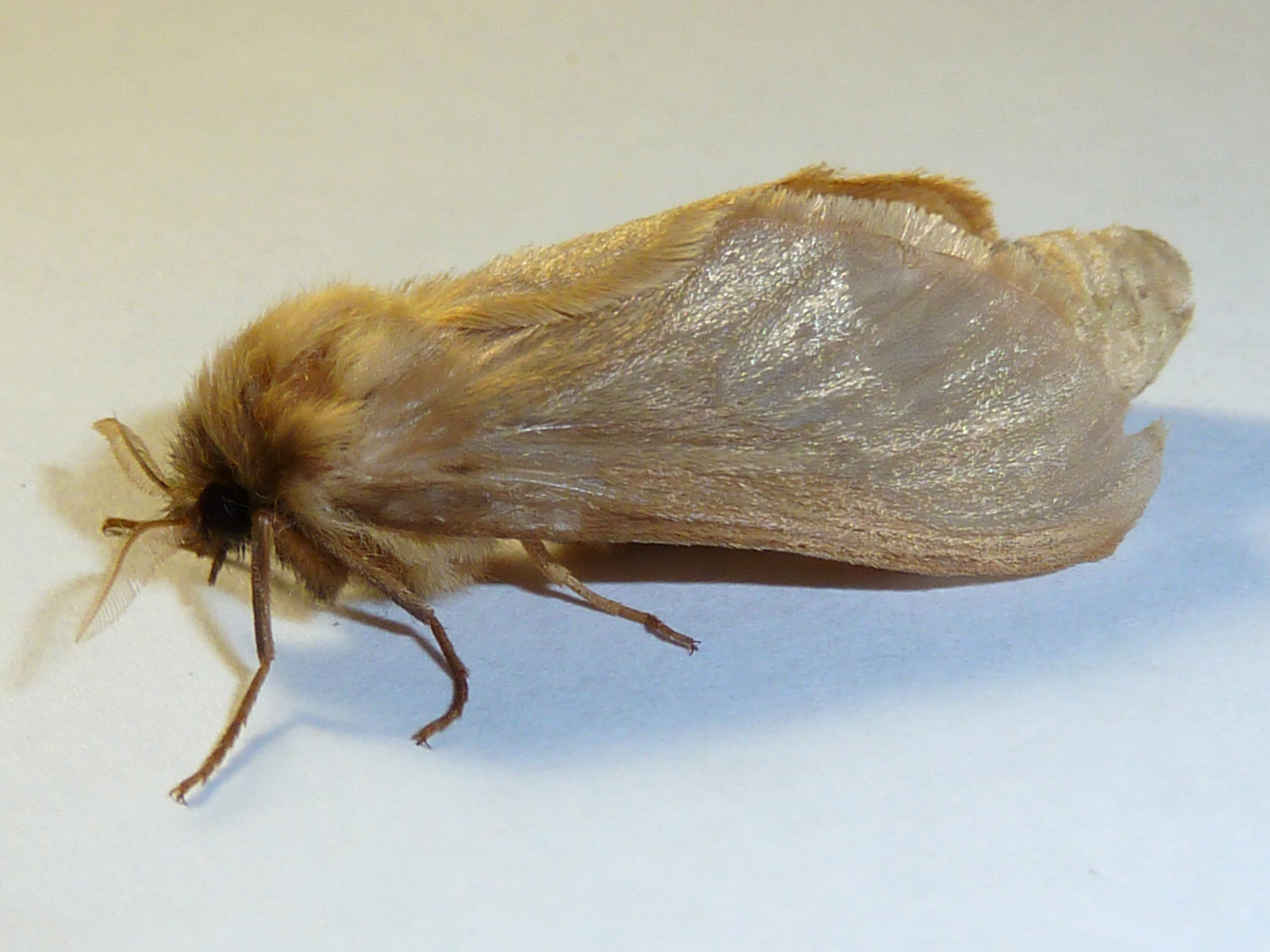
Gorgopis libania

- Gorgopis libania (Stoll, 1781)
- Gorgopis lobata Janse, 1942
- Gorgopis olivaceonotata Warren, 1914
- Gorgopis pallidiflava Janse, 1942
- Gorgopis pholidota Meyrick, 1921
- Gorgopis ptiloscelis (Meyrick, 1919)
- Gorgopis serangota Janse, 1942
- Gorgopis subrimosa Janse, 1942
- Gorgopis zellerii Dewitz, 1881
- Leto venus (Cramer, 1780)
- Metahepialus anguistiptera Janse, 1948
- Metahepialus plurimaculata (Warren, 1914)
- Metahepialus xenoctenis (Meyrick, 1926)

== Family Himantopteridae ==
- Doratopteryx afra Rogenhofer, 1883
- Doratopteryx plumigera Butler, 1888
- Pedoptila nemopteridia Butler, 1885
- Semioptila brachyura Hering, 1937
- Semioptila flavidiscata Hampson, 1910
- Semioptila fulveolans (Mabille, 1897)
- Semioptila longipennis Hering, 1937
- Semioptila lufirensis Joicey & Talbot, 1921
- Semioptila marshalli Rothschild, 1907
- Semioptila torta Butler, 1887
- Semioptila trogoloba Hampson, 1920

== Family Hyblaeidae ==
- Hyblaea fontainei Berio, 1967
- Hyblaea occidentalium Holland, 1894
- Hyblaea puera (Cramer, 1777)

== Family Immidae ==
- Imma arsisceles Meyrick, 1937
- Imma quaestoria Meyrick, 1911
- Moca tormentata (Meyrick, 1921)

== Family Incurvariidae ==
- Protaephagus capensis Scoble, 1980

== Family Lacturidae ==
- Gymnogramma cyanea Meyrick, 1912
- Gymnogramma eoxantha Meyrick, 1921
- Gymnogramma flavivitella (Walsingham, 1881)
- Gymnogramma hutchinsoni Walsingham, 1891
- Gymnogramma privata Meyrick, 1924
- Gymnogramma psyllodecta Meyrick, 1924
- Gymnogramma pyrozancla Meyrick, 1911
- Gymnogramma racemosa Meyrick, 1918
- Gymnogramma rhodoneura Meyrick, 1909
- Gymnogramma rufiventris (Zeller, 1852)

== Family Lasiocampidae ==
- Anadiasa affinis Aurivillius, 1911
- Anadiasa fuscofasciata (Aurivillius, 1922)
- Anadiasa jansei Aurivillius, 1917
- Anadiasa punctifascia Walker, 1855
- Anadiasa schoenheiti (Wichgraf, 1922)
- Beralade jordani Tams, 1936
- Beralade perobliqua Walker, 1855
- Beralade signinervis Strand, 1912
- Beralade wallengreni (Aurivillius, 1892)
- Bombycomorpha bifascia (Walker, 1855)
- Bombycomorpha dukei Joannou & Gurkovich, 2009
- Bombycomorpha pallida Distant, 1897
- Bombycopsis bipars (Walker, 1855)
- Bombycopsis capicola Aurivillius, 1921
- Bombycopsis indecora (Walker, 1865)
- Bombycopsis metallicus (Distant, 1898)
- Bombycopsis nigrovittata Aurivillius, 1927
- Bombycopsis ochroleuca Felder, 1874
- Bombycopsis venosa (Butler, 1895)
- Braura ligniclusa (Walker, 1865)
- Braura picturata (Grünberg, 1910)
- Braura truncatum (Walker, 1855)
- Catalebeda cuneilinea (Walker, 1856)
- Catalebeda discocellularis Strand, 1912
- Catalebeda jamesoni (Bethune-Baker, 1908)
- Chondrostegoides capensis Aurivillius, 1905
- Chondrostegoides jamaka Zolotuhin, 2007
- Chondrostegoides magna Zolotuhin, 2007
- Chondrostegoides murina (Aurivillius, 1927)
- Chondrostegoides nobilorum Zolotuhin, 2007
- Chondrostegoides ruficornis (Aurivillius, 1921)
- Chrysopsyche bivittata Aurivillius, 1927
- Chrysopsyche imparilis Aurivillius, 1905
- Chrysopsyche lutulenta Tams, 1923
- Cleopatrina bilinea (Walker, 1855)
- Cleopatrina phocea (Druce, 1887)
- Cymatopacha obscura Aurivillius, 1921
- Dinometa maputuana (Wichgraf, 1906)
- Dollmania cuprea (Distant, 1897)
- Dollmania flavia (Fawcett, 1915)
- Dollmania plinthochroa Tams, 1930
- Dollmania purpurascens (Aurivillius, 1909)
- Epicnapteroides fuliginosa Pinhey, 1973
- Epicnapteroides marmorata Pinhey, 1973
- Epitrabala argenteoguttata (Aurivillius, 1909)
- Epitrabala nyassana (Aurivillius, 1909)
- Eucraera gemmata (Distant, 1897)
- Eucraera koellikerii (Dewitz, 1881)
- Eucraera salammbo (Vuillot, 1892)
- Eutricha bifascia (Walker, 1855)
- Eutricha capensis (Linnaeus, 1767)
- Eutricha fulvida (Distant, 1897)
- Eutricha morosa (Walker, 1865)
- Eutricha obscura (Walker, 1855)
- Euwallengrenia rectilineata (Aurivillius, 1905)
- Euwallengrenia reducta (Walker, 1855)
- Gastropacha africana (Holland, 1893)
- Gastropacha quercifolia (Linnaeus, 1758)
- Gastroplakaeis meridionalis Aurivillius, 1901
- Gonometa postica Walker, 1855
- Gonometa rufobrunnea Aurivillius, 1922
- Grammodora nigrolineata (Aurivillius, 1895)
- Grellada enigmatica (Hering, 1941)
- Haplopacha cinerea Aurivillius, 1905
- Henometa clarki (Aurivillius, 1895)
- Hypotrabala sanguicincta (Aurivillius, 1901)
- Lasiocampa angulifera Walker, 1865
- Lasiocampa quercus (Linnaeus, 1758)
- Lebeda mustelina Distant, 1899
- Leipoxais emarginata Aurivillius, 1911
- Leipoxais peraffinis Holland, 1893
- Mallocampa leighi Aurivillius, 1922
- Mesocelis monticola Hübner, 1820
- Metadula indecisa Walker, 1865
- Metajana marshalli Aurivillius, 1909
- Mimopacha knoblauchii (Dewitz, 1881)
- Morongea missdebeerae Zolotuhin & Prozorov, 2010
- Napta straminea (Aurivillius, 1921)
- Nirbiana micha (Druce, 1899)
- Ocinaropsis obscura Aurivillius, 1905
- Odontocheilopteryx dollmani Tams, 1930
- Odontocheilopteryx myxa Wallengren, 1860
- Odontocheilopteryx obscura Aurivillius, 1927
- Odontopacha fenestrata Aurivillius, 1909
- Pachymeta capreolus Aurivillius, 1914
- Pachymetana neavei (Aurivillius, 1915)
- Pachytrina wenigina Zolotuhin & Gurkovich, 2009
- Pallastica lateritia (Hering, 1928)
- Pallastica lucifer Zolotuhin & Gurkovich, 2009
- Pallastica pallens (Bethune-Baker, 1908)
- Philotherma apithana Hering, 1928
- Philotherma media Aurivillius, 1909
- Philotherma obscura Aurivillius, 1927
- Philotherma rennei (Dewitz, 1881)
- Philotherma rosa (Druce, 1887)
- Pseudolyra cervina (Aurivillius, 1905)
- Pseudolyra cinerea (Aurivillius, 1901)
- Pseudolyra distincta (Distant, 1899)
- Pseudometa basalis (Walker, 1865)
- Pseudometa dollmani Tams, 1925
- Pseudometa viola Aurivillius, 1901
- Rhinobombyx cuneata Aurivillius, 1879
- Schausinna clementsi (Schaus, 1897)
- Schausinna regia (Grünberg, 1910)
- Sena breyeri (Aurivillius, 1922)
- Sena donaldsoni (Holland, 1901)
- Sena levenna (Wallengren, 1875)
- Sena parva (Aurivillius, 1921)
- Sena prompta (Walker, 1855)
- Sena simplex (Aurivillius, 1905)
- Stoermeriana aculeata (Walker, 1865)
- Stoermeriana amphilecta (Tams, 1936)
- Stoermeriana distinguenda (Aurivillius, 1905)
- Stoermeriana fusca (Aurivillius, 1905)
- Stoermeriana singulare (Aurivillius, 1893)
- Streblote bimaculatum (Walker, 1865)
- Streblote capensis (Aurivillius, 1905)
- Streblote concavum (Strand, 1912)
- Streblote concolor (Walker, 1855)
- Streblote cristata (Stoll, 1782)
- Streblote cupreum (Distant, 1899)
- Streblote jansei (Tams, 1936)
- Streblote polydora (Druce, 1887)
- Streblote uniforme (Aurivillius, 1927)
- Trichiurana meridionalis Aurivillius, 1921

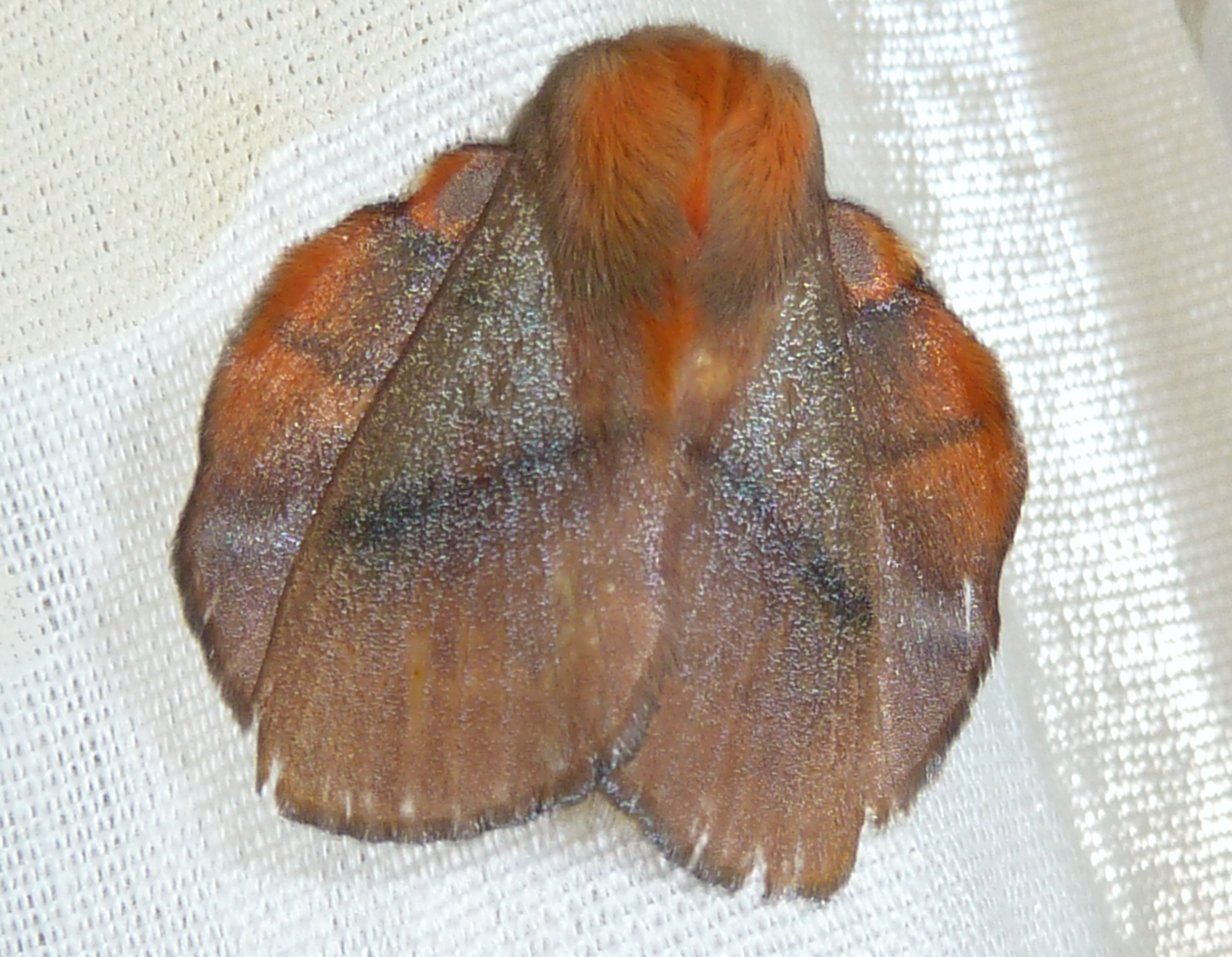
Trichopisthia igneotincta

- Trichopisthia igneotincta (Aurivillius, 1909)
- Trichopisthia monteiroi (Druce, 1887)

== Family Lecithoceridae ==
- Atrichozancla cosymbota (Meyrick, 1920)
- Atrichozancla gymnopalpa Janse, 1963
- Atrichozancla phaeocrossis (Meyrick, 1937)
- Cophomantella bifrenata (Meyrick, 1921)
- Cophomantella furnaria (Meyrick, 1913)
- Cophomantella homogramma (Meyrick, 1918)
- Dragmatucha bivia Meyrick, 1918
- Dragmatucha proaula Meyrick, 1908
- Epimactis atropunctella (Walsingham, 1881)
- Homaloxestis cholopis (Meyrick, 1906)
- Homaloxestis lophophora Janse, 1954
- Idiopteryx obliquella (Walsingham, 1881)
- Isotypa discopuncta Janse, 1954
- Lecithocera aenicta Janse, 1954
- Lecithocera anthologella Wallengren, 1875
- Lecithocera binotata Meyrick, 1918
- Lecithocera flavipalpis Walsingham, 1891
- Lecithocera ideologa Meyrick, 1937
- Lecithocera lucernata Meyrick, 1913
- Lecithocera myopa Meyrick, 1913
- Lecithocera officinalis Meyrick, 1911
- Odites assidua Meyrick, 1914
- Odites balsamias Meyrick, 1911
- Odites citrantha Meyrick, 1908
- Odites consignata Meyrick, 1921
- Odites crocota Meyrick, 1912
- Odites dilutella (Walsingham, 1881)
- Odites emensa Meyrick, 1921
- Odites exterrita Meyrick, 1937
- Odites fessa Meyrick, 1921
- Odites hemipercna Meyrick, 1914
- Odites insons Meyrick, 1912
- Odites inversa Meyrick, 1914
- Odites laconica Meyrick, 1927
- Odites meloxantha Meyrick, 1927
- Odites metaclista Meyrick, 1915
- Odites metaphracta Meyrick, 1909
- Odites metascia Meyrick, 1937
- Odites natalensis Walsingham, 1891
- Odites nubeculosa Meyrick, 1918
- Odites obumbrata Meyrick, 1925
- Odites obvia Meyrick, 1914
- Odites sucinea Meyrick, 1915
- Odites superscripta Meyrick, 1926
- Plagiocrossa picrodora (Meyrick, 1913)
- Protolychnis maculata (Walsingham, 1881)
- Protolychnis marginata (Walsingham, 1891)

== Family Lemoniidae ==
- Sabalia picarina Walker, 1865
- Sabalia thalia Fawcett, 1915

== Family Limacodidae ==
- Afraltha chionostola (Hampson, 1910)
- Afraltha luxuriosa (Hering, 1928)
- Afrobirthama flaccidia (Druce, 1899)
- Afrobirthama hobohmi Janse, 1964
- Afrobirthama reducta Hering, 1928
- Afromiresa ustitermina (Hampson, 1910)
- Apluda plebeja Wallengren, 1863
- Apreptophanes stevensoni Janse, 1964
- Arctozygaena quinquemaculata Gaede, 1926
- Astatophlebia marmarobrunnea Janse, 1964
- Brachia albiviata (Hampson, 1910)
- Brachia amblygrapta Janse, 1964
- Brachia breijeri (Janse, 1964)
- Brachypecta perobliqua Janse, 1964
- Caffricola cloeckneria (Stoll, 1781)
- Caffricola kenyensis Talbot, 1932
- Caffricola vicina Alberti, 1954
- Chrysamma amabilis Clench, 1955
- Chrysamma purpuripulcra Karsch, 1896
- Chrysopoloma bicolor (Distant, 1897)
- Chrysopoloma flaviceps Aurivillius, 1901
- Chrysopoloma isabellina Aurivillius, 1895
- Chrysopoloma pallens Hering, 1923
- Chrysopoloma paupera Hering, 1925
- Chrysopoloma restricta Distant, 1899
- Chrysopoloma rudis (Walker, 1865)
- Chrysopoloma similis Aurivillius, 1895
- Chrysopoloma varia Distant, 1899
- Coenobasis albiramosa (Walker, 1865)
- Coenobasis amoena Felder, 1874
- Coenobasis hemichlora Grünberg, 1910
- Coenobasis intermedia Janse, 1964
- Coenobasis panochra Janse, 1964
- Coenobasis turneri West, 1937
- Cosuma polana Druce, 1887
- Crothaema conspicua Janse, 1964
- Crothaema decorata Distant, 1892
- Crothaema schoutedeni Hering, 1954
- Ctenolita melanosticta (Bethune-Baker, 1909)
- Delorhachis kilosa West, 1940
- Deltoptera iphia Janse, 1964
- Ectropa ancilis Wallengren, 1863
- Exanthica atelacma Meyrick, 1926
- Exanthica trigonella (Felder & Rogenhofer, 1875)
- Gavara velutina Walker, 1857
- Halseyia basiclara (Hering, 1937)
- Halseyia bisecta (Butler, 1898)
- Halseyia biumbrata (Hampson, 1910)
- Halseyia intacta (Hering, 1937)
- Halseyia pseudobisecta (Hering, 1937)
- Halseyia rectifascia (Hering, 1937)
- Halseyia tamsi (Hering, 1937)
- Hamartia clarissa Hering, 1937
- Hamartia medora Hering, 1937
- Homosusica eugrapha Janse, 1964
- Inous nigripalpis Walker, 1855
- Isozinara pallidifascia Janse, 1964
- Jordaniana lactea (Pagenstecher, 1903)
- Latoia albicosta (Hampson, 1910)
- Latoia anagaura Janse, 1964
- Latoia eremotropha Janse, 1964
- Latoia johannes (Distant, 1898)
- Latoia latistriga (Walker, 1855)
- Latoia nivosa (Felder, 1874)
- Latoia urda (Druce, 1887)
- Latoia viridifascia Holland, 1893
- Latoia viridimixta Janse, 1964
- Latoia vitilena (Karsch, 1896)
- Latoia vivida (Walker, 1865)
- Latoiola pusilla (Aurivillius, 1900)
- Macroplectra meridionalis Hering, 1928
- Macroplectra rufopallens Hampson, 1910
- Macroplectra tripunctata Mabille, 1900
- Micraphe lateritia Karsch, 1896
- Monopecta castanea Janse, 1964
- Natada chrysaspis Hampson, 1910
- Natada kochi Janse, 1964
- Neogavara imitans Janse, 1964
- Neomocena brunneocrossa Janse, 1964
- Neomocena convergens (Hering, 1928)
- Niphadolepis bipunctata Hering, 1929
- Omocenoides isophanes Janse, 1964
- Paraphlebs singularis Aurivillius, 1921
- Parapluda invitabilis (Wallengren, 1860)
- Parapluda neglecta (Hering, 1928)
- Parasa chapmani Kirby, 1892
- Probalintha inclusa Walker, 1865
- Prodidactis mystica (Meyrick, 1918)
- Pseudothosea albisignata Janse, 1964
- Scotinocerides fasciata Hering, 1937
- Scotinocerides pseudorestricta Hering, 1937
- Scotinochroa diplothysana Tams, 1932
- Scotinochroa inconsequens Butler, 1897
- Scotinochroa rufescens Janse, 1964
- Semyrilla lineata (Holland, 1893)
- Sporetolepis platti Janse, 1964
- Stroter capillatus Karsch, 1899
- Stroter dukei Janse, 1964
- Stroter intermissa (Walker, 1865)
- Susicena pyrocausta (Hampson, 1910)
- Taeda aetitis Wallengren, 1863
- Taeda connexa (Janse, 1964)
- Taeda gemmans (Felder, 1874)
- Thosea platti West, 1937
- Trachyptena holobrunnea (Janse, 1964)
- Trogocrada deleter Tams, 1953
- Trogocrada dimorpha Janse, 1964
- Unipectiphora delosignata Janse, 1964
- Zarachella specularis Jordan, 1915
- Zinara discophora Hampson, 1910
- Zinara nervosa Walker, 1869
- Zorostola melanoxantha Janse, 1964

== Family Lymantriidae ==
- Aclonophlebia rhodea Hampson, 1905
- Aroa anthora (Felder, 1874)
- Aroa difficilis Walker, 1865
- Aroa discalis Walker, 1855
- Aroa melanoleuca Hampson, 1905
- Bicelluphora argentea Janse, 1915

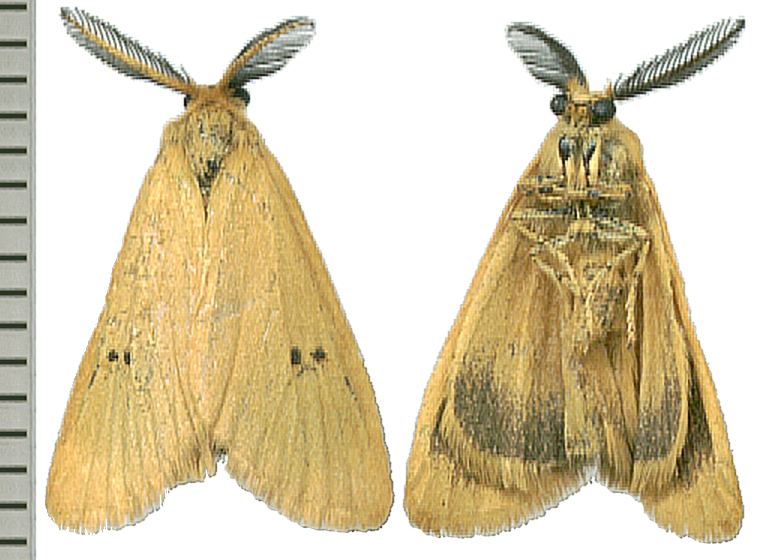
Bracharoa quadripunctata

- Bracharoa dregei (Herrich-Schäffer, 1854)
- Bracharoa mixta (Snellen, 1872)
- Bracharoa quadripunctata (Wallengren, 1875)
- Bracharoa tricolor (Herrich-Schäffer, 1856)
- Cimola opalina Walker, 1855
- Creagra liturata (Guérin-Méneville, 1844)
- Cropera phlebitis (Hampson, 1905)
- Cropera sericea (Hampson, 1910)
- Cropera stilpnaroma Hering, 1926
- Cropera testacea Walker, 1855
- Crorema adspersa (Herrich-Schäffer, 1854)
- Crorema fulvinotata (Butler, 1893)
- Crorema nigropunctata Collenette, 1931
- Crorema setinoides (Holland, 1893)
- Dasychira pennatula (Fabricius, 1793)
- Dasychira polia Hering, 1926
- Dasychira punctifera (Walker, 1857)
- Dicranuropsis vilis Felder, 1874
- Eudasychira georgiana (Fawcett, 1900)
- Eudasychira metathermes (Hampson, 1905)
- Eudasychira poliotis (Hampson, 1910)
- Eudasychira proleprota (Hampson, 1905)
- Euproctis aethiopica (Bethune-Baker, 1908)
- Euproctis beato Bryk, 1934
- Euproctis bicolor Janse, 1915
- Euproctis chionea Collenette, 1956
- Euproctis crocata (Boisduval, 1847)
- Euproctis flavicincta Janse, 1915
- Euproctis haemodetes Hampson, 1905
- Euproctis hardenbergia (Janse, 1915)
- Euproctis iridescens Janse, 1915
- Euproctis melanura (Wallengren, 1860)
- Euproctis nigripuncta Janse, 1915
- Euproctis pallida (Kirby, 1896)
- Euproctis petavia (Stoll, 1782)
- Euproctis producta (Walker, 1863)
- Euproctis punctifera (Walker, 1855)
- Euproctis rufopunctata (Walker, 1862)
- Euproctis sanguigutta Hampson, 1905
- Euproctis squamosa (Walker, 1855)
- Euproctis straminicolor Janse, 1915
- Euproctis subalba (Janse, 1915)
- Euproctis terminalis (Walker, 1854)
- Euproctoides ertli (Wichgraf, 1922)
- Hemerophanes diatoma (Hering, 1926)
- Hemerophanes libyra (Druce, 1896)
- Homochira rendalli (Distant, 1897)
- Homoeomeria flavicapilla (Wallengren, 1860)
- Homoeomeria nivea Aurivillius, 1909
- Knappetra arenacea (Linnaeus, 1767)
- Knappetra fasciata (Walker, 1855)
- Lacipa bizonoides Butler, 1893
- Lacipa distanti Dewitz, 1881
- Lacipa florida (Swinhoe, 1903)
- Lacipa gemmata Distant, 1897
- Lacipa nobilis (Herrich-Schäffer, 1855)
- Lacipa picta (Boisduval, 1847)
- Lacipa pulverea Distant, 1898
- Lacipa quadripunctata Dewitz, 1881
- Lacipa sarcistis Hampson, 1905
- Lacipa sexpunctata Distant, 1897
- Laelia albimaculata (Hering, 1926)
- Laelia amata (Hering, 1926)
- Laelia amaura Hering, 1926
- Laelia angustipennis (Walker, 1855)
- Laelia aurea Janse, 1915
- Laelia aurivillii (Hering, 1926)
- Laelia basifurca (Walker, 1865)
- Laelia batoides Plötz, 1880
- Laelia bifascia Hampson, 1905
- Laelia bonaberiensis (Strand, 1915)
- Laelia bryophilina (Hampson, 1910)
- Laelia clarki Janse, 1915
- Laelia confinis (Distant, 1899)
- Laelia curvivirgata Karsch, 1895
- Laelia danva (Schaus & Clements, 1893)
- Laelia diascia Hampson, 1905
- Laelia ecscota (Hampson, 1905)
- Laelia esthlopis (Collenette, 1953)
- Laelia extatura (Distant, 1897)
- Laelia extorta (Distant, 1897)
- Laelia figlina Distant, 1899
- Laelia fracta Schaus & Clements, 1893
- Laelia fusca (Walker, 1855)
- Laelia gephyra (Hering, 1926)
- Laelia haematica Hampson, 1905
- Laelia hampsoni (Hering, 1926)
- Laelia herbida (Walker, 1856)
- Laelia hughesi (Collenette, 1933)
- Laelia janenschi Hering, 1926
- Laelia lavia Swinhoe, 1903
- Laelia lunensis (Hampson, 1905)
- Laelia mediofasciata (Hering, 1926)
- Laelia melaxantha (Walker, 1865)
- Laelia municipalis Distant, 1897
- Laelia nigripulverea Janse, 1915
- Laelia nubifuga (Holland, 1893)
- Laelia octophora (Hampson, 1905)
- Laelia phenax (Collenette, 1932)
- Laelia pluto (Hering, 1926)
- Laelia postpura (Hampson, 1905)
- Laelia pulcherrima (Hering, 1926)
- Laelia punctulata (Butler, 1875)
- Laelia pyrosoma (Hampson, 1910)
- Laelia robusta Janse, 1915
- Laelia rocana (Swinhoe, 1906)
- Laelia rosea Schaus & Clements, 1893
- Laelia subrosea (Walker, 1855)
- Laelia subviridis Janse, 1915
- Laelia swinnyi Janse, 1915
- Laelia thanatos (Hering, 1926)
- Laelia xyleutis Hampson, 1905
- Lepidopalpus hyalina Janse, 1915
- Leptaroa paupera Hering, 1926
- Leucoma monosticta (Butler, 1898)
- Leucoma ogovensis (Holland, 1893)
- Leucoma parva (Plötz, 1880)
- Lymantria disparina (Hering, 1926)
- Lymantria kettlewelli Collenette, 1953
- Lymantria tacita Hering, 1927
- Marblepsis flabellaria (Fabricius, 1787)
- Marblepsis melanocraspis (Hampson, 1905)
- Micraroa minima Janse, 1915
- Micraroa rufescens Hampson, 1905
- Morasa modesta Walker, 1855
- Naroma varipes (Walker, 1865)
- Ogoa simplex Walker, 1856
- Olapa fulviceps Hampson, 1910
- Olapa furva Hampson, 1905
- Olapa nigricosta Hampson, 1905
- Olapa nuda Holland, 1893
- Olene basalis (Walker, 1855)
- Palasea albimacula Wallengren, 1863
- Paqueta chloroscia (Hering, 1926)
- Paraproctis chionopeza Collenette, 1954
- Penthophera lutea (Boisduval, 1847)
- Penthophera subfusca (Boisduval, 1847)
- Pirga pellucida Wichgraf, 1922
- Pirga transvalensis Janse, 1915
- Polymona rufifemur Walker, 1855
- Psalis africana Kiriakoff, 1956
- Psalis securis Hübner, 1823
- Pseudobazisa perculta (Distant, 1897)
- Pseudobazisa sericea (Hampson, 1910)
- Pteredoa monosticta (Butler, 1898)
- Pteredoa plumosa Hampson, 1905
- Pteredoa usebia (Swinhoe, 1903)
- Repena fusca Walker, 1856
- Rhypopteryx diplogramma Hering, 1927
- Rhypopteryx hemichrysa Collenette, 1960
- Rhypopteryx lugardi (Swinhoe, 1903)
- Rhypopteryx rhodalipha (Felder, 1874)
- Rhypopteryx rhodea (Hampson, 1905
- Rhypopteryx rubripunctata (Weymer, 1892)
- Ruanda furva (Hampson, 1905)
- Ruanda nuda (Holland, 1897)
- Schalidomitra ambages Strand, 1911
- Stracena bananae (Butler, 1897)
- Stracena tavetensis (Holland, 1892)
- Stracena telesilla (Druce, 1899)
- Tearosoma aspersum Felder, 1874

== Family Lyonetiidae ==
- Chrysolytis deliarcha Meyrick, 1937
- Copobathra menodora Meyrick, 1911
- Crobylophora daricella Meyrick, 1881
- Crobylophora metallifera (Walsingham, 1891)
- Crobylophora xanthochyta Meyrick, 1918
- Cycloponympha julia Meyrick, 1913
- Cycloponympha perspicua Meyrick, 1913
- Leucoptera autograpta Meyrick, 1918
- Leucoptera clerodendrella Vári, 1955
- Leucoptera loxaula Meyrick, 1928
- Leucoptera meyricki Ghesquière, 1940
- Leucoptera obelacma Meyrick, 1918
- Leucoptera parinaricola Vári, 1955
- Leucoptera pulchricola Vári, 1955
- Leucoptera scammatias Meyrick, 1909
- Lyonetia cotifraga Meyrick, 1909
- Phyllobrostis apathetica (Meyrick, 1921)
- Phyllobrostis argillosa Meyrick, 1911
- Phyllobrostis calcaria Meyrick, 1911
- Pilotocoma tephroleuca Meyrick, 1913

== Family Metarbelidae ==
- Arbelodes agassizi Lehmann, 2010
- Arbelodes albitorquata (Hampson, 1910)
- Arbelodes collaris Aurivillius, 1921
- Arbelodes deprinsi Lehmann, 2010
- Arbelodes dicksoni Lehmann, 2010
- Arbelodes flavicolor (Janse, 1925)
- Arbelodes franziskae Lehmann, 2010
- Arbelodes griseata (Janse, 1925)
- Arbelodes haberlandorum Lehmann, 2010
- Arbelodes iridescens (Janse, 1925)
- Arbelodes kruegeri Lehmann, 2010
- Arbelodes meridialis Karsch, 1896
- Arbelodes mondeensis Lehmann, 2010
- Arbelodes sebelensis Lehmann, 2010
- Arbelodes shimonii Lehmann, 2010
- Arbelodes sticticosta (Hampson, 1910)
- Arbelodes varii Lehmann, 2010
- Indarbela tegula (Distant, 1897)
- Kroonia natalica (Hampson, 1910)
- Lebedodes castanea Janse, 1925
- Lebedodes reticulata Gaede, 1929
- Lebedodes rufithorax Hampson, 1910
- Lebedodes wichgrafi (Grünberg, 1910)
- Marshalliana jansei Gaede, 1929
- Metarbela costistrigata Hampson, 1920
- Metarbela cymaphora Hampson, 1910
- Metarbela dialeuca Hampson, 1910
- Metarbela tuckeri (Butler, 1875)
- Ortharbela albivenata (Hampson, 1910)
- Paralebedella carnescens (Hampson, 1910)
- Salagena obsolescens Hampson, 1910
- Salagena reticulata Janse, 1925
- Salagena tessellata Distant, 1897
- Salagena transversa Walker, 1865
- Teragra althodes Hampson, 1920
- Teragra conspersa Walker, 1855
- Teragra guttifera Hampson, 1910
- Teragra irvingi Janse, 1925
- Teragra vogti Bethune-Baker, 1927

== Family Micropterigidae ==
- Agrionympha capensis Whalley, 1978
- Agrionympha fuscoapicella Gibbs, 2011
- Agrionympha jansella Gibbs, 2011
- Agrionympha karoo Gibbs, 2011
- Agrionympha kroonella Gibbs, 2011
- Agrionympha pseliacma Meyrick, 1921
- Agrionympha pseudovari Gibbs, 2011
- Agrionympha sagitella Gibbs, 2011
- Agrionympha vari Whalley, 1978

== Family Nepticulidae ==
About 118 species - see: List of moths of South Africa (Nepticulidae)

== Family Noctuidae ==
About 1,323 species - see: List of moths of South Africa (Noctuidae)

== Family Nolidae ==
- Acripia chloropera Hampson, 1902
- Acripia leprosa (Felder & Rogenhofer, 1874)
- Acripia scapularis (Felder & Rogenhofer, 1874)
- Acripia semiviridis Hampson, 1902
- Acripia subolivacea Walker, 1863
- Aiteta veluta Hampson, 1912
- Arcyophora elegantula Grünberg, 1910
- Arcyophora longivalvis Guenée, 1852
- Arcyophora nudipes Wallengren, 1856
- Blenina albifascia Pinhey, 1968
- Blenina diagona Hampson, 1912
- Blenina squamifera (Wallengren, 1860)
- Bryophilopsis curvifera Hampson, 1912
- Bryophilopsis tarachoides Mabille, 1900
- Bryothripa miophaea Hampson, 1912
- Characoma melanographa Hampson, 1918
- Characoma miophora Hampson, 1912
- Characoma nigricollaris Hampson, 1918
- Characoma stictigrapta Hampson, 1914
- Characoma submediana Wiltshire, 1986
- Cremopalpus inquirendus Strand, 1909
- Cryptothripa polyhymnia (Hampson, 1902)
- Earias biplaga Walker, 1866
- Earias cupreoviridis (Walker, 1862)
- Earias insulana (Boisduval, 1833)
- Gigantoceras rectilinea Hampson, 1912
- Goniocalpe heteromorpha Hampson, 1920
- Goniocalpe sericealis (Hampson, 1902)
- Labanda bryochlora Hampson, 1902
- Leocyma appollinis Guenée, 1852
- Leocyma discophora Hampson, 1912
- Lophocrama phoenicochlora Hampson, 1912
- Maurilia arcuata (Walker, [1858])
- Meganola infuscata (Hampson, 1903)
- Meganola lucia (van Son, 1933)
- Meganola subalbalis (Zeller, 1852)
- Metanola gladstonei van Son, 1933
- Metanola myriostigma van Son, 1933
- Neaxestis acutangula Hampson, 1902
- Neaxestis rhoda Hampson, 1905
- Negeta luminosa (Walker, 1858)
- Negeta ruficeps (Hampson, 1902)
- Nola argyrolepis Hampson, 1907
- Nola barbertonensis (van Son, 1933)
- Nola bicincta Hampson, 1905
- Nola holoscota Hampson, 1920
- Nola imitata (van Son, 1933)
- Nola internella (Walker, 1865)
- Nola iridescens (van Son, 1933)
- Nola leucalea Hampson, 1907
- Nola major Hampson, 1891
- Nola melanoscelis (Hampson, 1914)
- Nola meridionalis Wallengren, 1875
- Nola mesoscota Hampson, 1909
- Nola monofascia van Son, 1933
- Nola patricia van Son, 1933
- Nola phaeocraspis (Hampson, 1909)
- Nola poliotis Hampson, 1907
- Nola praefica Saalmüller, 1884
- Nola sarniensis (van Son, 1933)
- Nola socotrensis (Hampson, 1901)
- Nola squalida Staudinger, 1870
- Nola steniphona van Son, 1933
- Nola swierstrai van Son, 1933
- Nola taeniata Snellen, 1874
- Nola tineoides (Walker, [1858])
- Nola transitoria van Son, 1933
- Nolidia carolinae van Son, 1933
- Nolidia unipuncta van Son, 1933
- Nycteola malachitis (Hampson, 1912)
- Oedicraspis subfervida Hampson, 1912
- Paranola bipartita van Son, 1933
- Paranola nigristriga van Son, 1933
- Paraxestis rufescens Hampson, 1902
- Pardasena atripuncta Hampson, 1912
- Pardasena minorella Walker, 1866
- Pardasena punctata Hampson, 1902
- Pardasena virgulana (Mabille, 1880)
- Pardoxia graellsii (Feisthamel, 1837)
- Periplusia cinerascens Holland, 1894
- Poecilonola littoralis van Son, 1933
- Risoba obstructa Moore, 1881
- Risoba sticticraspis Hampson, 1912
- Selepa docilis Butler, 1881
- Selepa leucogonia (Hampson, 1905)
- Selepa rufescens Hampson, 1912
- Selepa transvalica Hampson, 1912
- Vandamia lightfooti van Son, 1933
- Vandamia mariepi van Son, 1933
- Vandamia typica van Son, 1933
- Westermannia araeogramma Hampson, 1905
- Westermannia argyroplaga Hampson, 1905
- Westermannia convergens Hampson, 1902
- Westermannia roseitincta Pinhey, 1968
- Westermannia superba Hübner, 1823
- Xanthodes albago (Fabricius, 1794)

== Family Notodontidae ==
- Acrasiella curvilinea (Swinhoe, 1907)
- Adrallia bipunctata Walker, 1865
- Afrogluphisia demas Kiriakoff, 1970
- Afroplitis dasychirina (Gaede, 1928)
- Afroplitis phyllocampa (Trimen, 1909)
- Amphiphalera nigripuncta Kiriakoff, 1975
- Amyops ingens Karsch, 1895
- Anaphe panda (Boisduval, 1847)
- Anaphe reticulata Walker, 1855
- Antheua anodonta (Hampson, 1910)
- Antheua aurifodinae (Distant, 1902)
- Antheua consanguinea Distant, 1903
- Antheua croceipuncta Hampson, 1910
- Antheua delicata Bethune-Baker, 1911
- Antheua dimorpha Janse, 1920
- Antheua extenuata Walker, 1869
- Antheua insignata Gaede, 1928
- Antheua mixta Janse, 1920
- Antheua ornata (Walker, 1865)
- Antheua simplex Walker, 1855
- Antheua tricolor Walker, 1855
- Antheua woerdeni (Snellen, 1872)
- Antheuella flavida (Hampson, 1910)
- Antheuella incana (Janse, 1920)
- Anticleapa varii Kiriakoff, 1970
- Archistilbia varii Kiriakoff, 1970
- Arciera phragmatoecioides (Rothschild, 1917)
- Atrasana nigrosignata Kiriakoff, 1975
- Atrasana postica Walker, 1856
- Atrasana rectilinea (Gaede, 1928)
- Atrasana uncifera (Hampson, 1910)
- Batempa plana Kiriakoff, 1962
- Bilulua strigata Kiriakoff, 1954
- Bisolita rubrifascia (Hampson, 1910)
- Bisolita strigata (Aurivillius, 1906)
- Catastygne tristicolor (Gaede, 1928)
- Catochria catocaloides Herrich-Schäffer, 1855
- Catochria postflava Kiriakoff, 1955
- Cerurella natalensis Kiriakoff, 1962
- Chlorocalliope calliope (Hampson, 1910)
- Chlorocalliope subvernalis Kiriakoff, 1958
- Chlorochadisra viridipulverea (Gaede, 1928)
- Clostera lentisignata (Hampson, 1910)
- Clostera limacodina Kühne, 2010
- Clostera roseotincta (Janse, 1920)
- Clostera violacearia (Janse, 1920)
- Clostera vumba Kiriakoff, 1981
- Crambometra derelicta Prout, 1915
- Crambometra gladstonei (Janse, 1920)
- Crambometra vandenbergae Kiriakoff, 1981
- Dasychirella cinderella Kiriakoff, 1970
- Deinarchia agramma (Hampson, 1910)
- Desmeocraera atribasalis (Hampson, 1910)
- Desmeocraera basalis Distant, 1899
- Desmeocraera congoana Aurivillius, 1900
- Desmeocraera dorsalis Kiriakoff, 1981
- Desmeocraera griseiviridis (Hampson, 1910)
- Desmeocraera interpellatrix (Wallengren, 1860)
- Desmeocraera jansei Kiriakoff, 1958
- Desmeocraera latex (Druce, 1901)
- Desmeocraera nugatrix Felder, 1874
- Desmeocraera octoginta (Hampson, 1910)
- Desmeocraera platti Janse, 1920
- Desmeocraera tripuncta Janse, 1920
- Desmeocraera uniformis Gaede, 1928
- Desmeocraera vernalis Distant, 1897
- Desmeocraera zombae Kiriakoff, 1958
- Disracha persimilis (Hampson, 1910)
- Elaphrodes duplex (Gaede, 1928)
- Epanaphe clarilla Aurivillius, 1904
- Epicerulella imitans Kiriakoff, 1981
- Epicerura pergrisea (Hampson, 1910)
- Epicerura steniptera (Hampson, 1910)
- Epidonta brunneomixta (Mabille, 1897)
- Euanthia venosa Kiriakoff, 1962
- Eubreyeria dasychiroides (Janse, 1920)
- Eurystaura brunnea Janse, 1920
- Eurystaura griseitincta (Hampson, 1910)
- Eurystauridia medialis (Gaede, 1928)
- Eurystauridia triangularis (Gaede, 1928)
- Eutimia marpissa Wallengren, 1858
- Graphodonta fulva (Kiriakoff, 1962)
- Hampsonita esmeralda (Hampson, 1910)
- Haplozana nigrolineata Aurivillius, 1901
- Iostaura jansei Kiriakoff, 1970
- Iridoplitis iridescens Kiriakoff, 1955
- Janthinisca badia Kiriakoff, 1979
- Janthinisca linda Kiriakoff, 1979
- Jozinia leonina Kiriakoff, 1970
- Lopiena decorata Kiriakoff, 1975
- Metascrancia jansei Kiriakoff, 1970
- Metopteryx cinerea (Janse, 1920)
- Metopteryx rattus (Kiriakoff, 1970)
- Notocerura spiritalis (Distant, 1899)
- Notoxantha sesamiodes Hampson, 1910
- Odontoperas heterogyna (Hampson, 1910)
- Odontoperas obliqualinea (Bethune-Baker, 1911)
- Odontoperas rosacea Kiriakoff, 1959
- Paradiastema pulverea Hampson, 1910
- Pararethona hierax (Distant, 1897)
- Peratodonta gypsitea (Kiriakoff, 1968)
- Phalera imitata Druce, 1896
- Phalera lignitea Mabille, 1900
- Phalera lydenburgi Distant, 1899
- Phycitimorpha stigmatica Janse, 1920
- Phyllaliodes agramma Hampson, 1910
- Phyllaliodes poliostrota (Hampson, 1910)
- Polelassothys plumitarsus Janse, 1920
- Polienus capillata (Wallengren, 1875)
- Polienus fuscatus Janse, 1920
- Polienus rubritincta (Hampson, 1910)
- Psalisodes defasciata Gaede, 1928
- Pseudorethona albicans (Walker, 1855)
- Pseudoscrancia africana (Holland, 1893)
- Quista cinereomixta Kiriakoff, 1959
- Rasemia dasychira (Hampson, 1910)
- Rasemia euzopherodes (Hampson, 1910)
- Rasemia macrodonta (Hampson, 1909)
- Rhenea mediata (Walker, 1865)
- Rhenea rufescens Kiriakoff, 1954
- Riebeeckia whittakeri Kiriakoff, 1981
- Rosinella rosinaria (Hampson, 1910)
- Sarimarais bicolor (Distant, 1899)
- Sarimarais peringueyi (Janse, 1920)
- Sarimarais quarta Kiriakoff, 1962
- Scalmicauda oneili Janse, 1920
- Scalmicauda tessmanni (Strand, 1911)
- Scrancia atrifrons Hampson, 1910
- Scrancia brunnescens Gaede, 1928
- Scrancia discomma Jordan, 1916
- Scrancia elanus Kiriakoff, 1971
- Scrancia galactoperoides Kiriakoff, 1970
- Scrancia milvus Kiriakoff, 1971
- Scrancia stictica Hampson, 1910
- Simesia dasychiroides (Butler, 1898)
- Stemmatophalera semiflava (Hampson, 1910)
- Stenostaura impeditus (Walker, 1865)
- Stenostaura minutissima Kiriakoff, 1970
- Stenostaura subtilis Kiriakoff, 1970
- Stenostaura varians (Kiriakoff, 1962)
- Subscrancia albobrunnea Kiriakoff, 1970
- Subscrancia nigra (Aurivillius, 1904)
- Synete olivaceofusca (Rothschild, 1917)
- Thaumetopoea apologetica Strand, 1909
- Trotonotus bettoni Butler, 1898

== Family Oecophoridae ==
- Aeoloscelis tripoda Meyrick, 1913
- Agroecodes comata Meyrick, 1937
- Alabonia coarctata (Walsingham, 1881)
- Amphipseustis disputanda Meyrick, 1921
- Anchinia furculata Meyrick, 1924
- Anchinia oenochares Meyrick, 1924
- Antaeotricha ovata Walsingham, 1881
- Areocosma orsobela Meyrick, 1917
- Aulotropha pentasticta Meyrick, 1918
- Batia decurrens (Meyrick, 1918)
- Borkhausenia intumescens Meyrick, 1921
- Briarostoma pyrrhopsamma Meyrick, 1920
- Ceranthes apellodora Meyrick, 1926
- Ceranthes syncrotaula Meyrick, 1926
- Ceranthes thiota Meyrick, 1918
- Chalcorectis argoplecta Meyrick, 1937
- Choronoma isoxysta Meyrick, 1926
- Coesyra balantias Meyrick, 1908
- Coesyra campylotis Meyrick, 1914
- Coesyra centrobola Meyrick, 1914
- Coesyra rutila Meyrick, 1912
- Crystallogenes chalcoschista Meyrick, 1937
- Diocosma callichroa Meyrick, 1909
- Diocosma ceramopis Meyrick, 1909
- Diocosma eotrocha Meyrick, 1918
- Diocosma molybdela Meyrick, 1917
- Diocosma obliquestrigella (Walsingham, 1881)
- Diocosma tricycla Meyrick, 1909
- Diocosma zarifa Meyrick, 1921
- Doxomeres diaxantha Meyrick, 1917
- Endrosis psammodora Meyrick, 1921
- Endrosis sarcitrella (Linnaeus, 1758)
- Epiphractis aulica Meyrick, 1912
- Epiphractis crocoplecta Meyrick, 1913
- Epiphractis imbellis Meyrick, 1914
- Epiphractis rubricata Meyrick, 1913
- Epiphractis sarcopa (Meyrick, 1909)
- Epiphractis thysanarcha Meyrick, 1918
- Eucleodora chalybeella Walsingham, 1881
- Eucleodora ingrata Meyrick, 1913
- Eulechria phaeopsamma Meyrick, 1913
- Harpella scolopistis Meyrick, 1909
- Hednophora pyritis Meyrick, 1911
- Heterozyga gyrospila Meyrick, 1918
- Hypercallia haematella Felder, 1875
- Hypercallia sincera Meyrick, 1909
- Hypercallia subreticulata Walsingham, 1881
- Isocrita eremasta Meyrick, 1914
- Isocrita ithydoxa Meyrick, 1920
- Isocrita protophanes Meyrick, 1927
- Isocrita psalactis Meyrick, 1912
- Isocrita stolarcha Meyrick, 1909
- Meloteles xanthodoxa Meyrick, 1920
- Metachanda citrodesma (Meyrick, 1911)
- Metachanda oxyacma Meyrick, 1928
- Metachanda trimetopa Meyrick, 1937
- Ocystola proxena Meyrick, 1914
- Oedematopoda illucens (Meyrick, 1914)
- Oedematopoda princeps (Zeller, 1852)
- Opsigenes parastacta Meyrick, 1918
- Oxyscopa dealbata Meyrick, 1926
- Pachyrhabda triplecta Meyrick, 1913
- Pachyrhabda unctoria Meyrick, 1911
- Parapleuris oxycrena Meyrick, 1937
- Philametris aethalopa Meyrick, 1924
- Philobota chalinitis Meyrick, 1909
- Philobota dryinota Meyrick, 1914
- Philobota erastis Meyrick, 1910
- Philobota tectifera Meyrick, 1909
- Philobota virgo Walsingham, 1891
- Phratriodes curvisignis Meyrick, 1926
- Picrogenes bactrospila Meyrick, 1917
- Plesiosticha acida (Meyrick, 1911)
- Plesiosticha endocentra (Meyrick, 1914)
- Plesiosticha galactaea (Meyrick, 1908)
- Pleurota drucella (Walsingham, 1881)
- Promalactis geometrica Meyrick, 1913
- Promalactis recurva Meyrick, 1914
- Promalactis scalmotoma Meyrick, 1918
- Promalactis sphaerograpta Meyrick, 1937
- Promalactis veridica Meyrick, 1913
- Protomacha conservata Meyrick, 1918
- Protomacha sosigona Meyrick, 1920
- Rhoecoptera gigas (Walsingham, 1891)
- Saropla dryozona Meyrick, 1913
- Schiffermuelleria helminthias Meyrick, 1918
- Schiffermuelleria pedicata Meyrick, 1918
- Selidoris deligata (Meyrick, 1921)
- Stathmopoda arcata Meyrick, 1913
- Stathmopoda auriferella (Walker, 1864)
- Stathmopoda autoxantha Meyrick, 1913
- Stathmopoda citrinopis Meyrick, 1927
- Stathmopoda crassella Walsingham, 1891
- Stathmopoda ficivora Kasy, 1973
- Stathmopoda glyceropa Meyrick, 1915
- Stathmopoda hemiplecta Meyrick, 1921
- Stathmopoda luminata Meyrick, 1911
- Stathmopoda lychnacma (Meyrick, 1927)
- Stathmopoda maculata Walsingham, 1891
- Stathmopoda pomifera Meyrick, 1913
- Stathmopoda trichodora (Meyrick, 1909)
- Stathmopoda xanthoplitis Meyrick, 1908
- Tanyzancla diorycta Meyrick, 1920
- Tanyzancla semistricta Meyrick, 1920
- Teratopsis tunicella Walsingham, 1881
- Thamnocrana haemorrhoa Meyrick, 1927
- Thyestarcha acrogypsa Meyrick, 1917
- Thyestarcha edax Meyrick, 1912

== Family Opostegidae ==
- Opostega amphimitra Meyrick, 1913
- Opostega cirrhacma Meyrick, 1911
- Opostega diplardis Meyrick, 1921
- Opostega granifera Meyrick, 1913
- Opostega idiocoma Meyrick, 1918
- Opostega melitardis Meyrick, 1918
- Opostega pelocrossa Meyrick, 1928
- Opostega phaeosoma Meyrick, 1928
- Opostega praefusca Meyrick, 1913
- Opostega radiosa Meyrick, 1913
- Opostega symbolica Meyrick, 1914
- Opostega tincta Meyrick, 1918
- Pseudopostega bellicosa (Meyrick, 1911)
- Pseudopostega clastozona (Meyrick, 1913)

== Family Plutellidae ==
- Gypsosaris coniata Meyrick, 1909
- Lepocnemis bascanopa Meyrick, 1913
- Plutella balanopis Meyrick, 1909
- Plutella xylostella (Linnaeus, 1758)

== Family Prodoxidae ==
- Lampronia albifusa Meyrick, 1926
- Sindonophora leucozona Meyrick, 1917

== Family Prototheoridae ==
- Prototheora biserrata Davis, 1996
- Prototheora cooperi Janse, 1942
- Prototheora corvifera (Meyrick, 1920)
- Prototheora drackensbergae Davis, 1996
- Prototheora geniculata Davis, 1996
- Prototheora merga Davis, 1996
- Prototheora monoglossa Meyrick, 1924
- Prototheora parachlora (Meyrick, 1919)
- Prototheora petrosema Meyrick, 1917
- Prototheora quadricornis Meyrick, 1920
- Prototheora serruligera Meyrick, 1920

== Family Psychidae ==
- Acanthopsyche roomei Bourgogne, 1984
- Acanthopsyche tristis Janse, 1917
- Amydria poliodes Meyrick, 1909
- Australoplacodoma bicolorata Sobczyk & Mey, 2007
- Bacotia trimenii (Heylaerts, 1891)
- Bambalina africa Bourgogne, 1984
- Barbaroscardia metaclina Meyrick, 1920
- Bythogenes atechna Meyrick, 1937
- Cathalistis orinephela Meyrick, 1917
- Commotrias eucolapta Meyrick, 1924
- Cryptothelea zelleri (Heylaerts, 1884)
- Ctenocompa famula Meyrick, 1920
- Ctenocompa perlucescens Meyrick, 1927
- Ctenocompa vafra Meyrick, 1921
- Ctenocompa zascia Meyrick, 1920
- Deborreides febrettina (Bourgogne, 1965)
- Diaphanopsyche rogenhoferi (Heylaerts, 1890)
- Dissoctena affinis Walsingham, 1891
- Epaleura salaria Meyrick, 1917
- Epichnopterix transvalica Hampson, 1910
- Eumeta cervina Druce, 1887
- Eumeta hardenbergeri Bourgogne, 1955
- Eumeta zelleri Heylaerts, 1884
- Fallacipsyche adelpha Bourgogne, 1977
- Gymnelema discerpta Meyrick, 1924
- Gymnelema holopercna Meyrick, 1924
- Gymnelema leucopasta Hampson, 1910
- Gymnelema pelverulenta Hampson, 1910
- Gymnelema plebigena Meyrick, 1924
- Gymnelema stibarodes (Meyrick, 1909)
- Gymnelema stygialis Hampson, 1910
- Gymnelema vinctus (Walker, 1865)
- Janseides subhyalina (Janse, 1917)
- Kotochalia junodi (Heylaerts, 1890)
- Lasioctena sisyraea Meyrick, 1887
- Lytrophila humida Meyrick, 1913
- Lytrophila ingeminata Meyrick, 1914
- Lytrophila panarga Meyrick, 1913
- Lytrophila phaulopa Meyrick, 1921
- Lytrophila sporarcha Meyrick, 1921
- Mallobathra zophaula Meyrick, 1920
- Melasina hippias Meyrick, 1921
- Melasina lanyphaea Meyrick, 1924
- Melasina nigra Meyrick, 1910
- Mesopherna incultella (Walker, 1864)
- Metisa aethiops (Hampson, 1910)
- Metisa heylaertsi (Junod, 1898)
- Metisa jansei Bourgogne, 1973
- Monda bicolor Strand, 1911
- Monda delicatissima Walker, 1865
- Narycia antibatis Meyrick, 1926
- Narycia centropa Meyrick, 1922
- Narycia isoxantha Meyrick, 1920
- Narycia prothyrodes Meyrick, 1921
- Narycia saccharata (Meyrick, 1914)
- Narycia transvaalicola Strand, 1929
- Oiketicoides maledicta (Scheben, 1910)
- Penestoglossa capensis Felder & Rogenhofer, 1875
- Picrospora achlyota (Meyrick, 1926)
- Picrospora amalthea (Meyrick, 1937)
- Picrospora anastrota Meyrick, 1912
- Picrospora araea Meyrick, 1912
- Picrospora chrysochalca (Meyrick, 1926)
- Picrospora coniographa (Meyrick, 1928)
- Picrospora crocostacta (Meyrick, 1912)
- Picrospora frigens (Meyrick, 1921)
- Picrospora furcifera (Meyrick, 1920)
- Picrospora inops (Meyrick, 1921)
- Picrospora isometra (Meyrick, 1926)
- Picrospora lithacopa Meyrick, 1920
- Picrospora medicata (Meyrick, 1914)
- Picrospora ochrophragma (Meyrick, 1920)
- Picrospora protocentra Meyrick, 1921
- Picrospora purgata Meyrick, 1913
- Picrospora secura (Meyrick, 1912)
- Picrospora selmatarcha (Meyrick, 1921)
- Placodoma fulva Sobczyk & Mey, 2007
- Pseudometisa alba (Janse, 1917)
- Psyche fatalis Meyrick, 1926
- Psyche luticoma (Meyrick, 1918)
- Psyche obscurata Meyrick, 1917
- Psyche ominosa (Meyrick, 1918)
- Psyche pinicola Meyrick, 1937
- Sapheneutis certificata Meyrick, 1918
- Sapheneutis galactodes Meyrick, 1915
- Sapheneutis thlipsias Meyrick, 1915
- Sclerophricta tyreuta Meyrick, 1918
- Sematocera fuliginipuncta Durrant, 1892
- Taleporia discussa Meyrick, 1921
- Taleporia mesochlora Meyrick, 1918
- Taleporia sciacta Meyrick, 1921
- Thranitica hemicopa Meyrick, 1908
- Trichocossus albiguttata Hampson, 1910
- Trichocossus arvensis Janse, 1917
- Typhonia abacodes (Meyrick, 1908)
- Typhonia amica (Meyrick, 1908)
- Typhonia animosa (Meyrick, 1913)
- Typhonia bettoni (Butler, 1898)
- Typhonia circophora (Meyrick, 1909)
- Typhonia cnaphalodes (Meyrick, 1917)
- Typhonia craterodes (Meyrick, 1917)
- Typhonia cylindraula (Meyrick, 1920)
- Typhonia dissoluta (Meyrick, 1908)
- Typhonia effervescens (Meyrick, 1911)
- Typhonia gypsopetra (Meyrick, 1937)
- Typhonia halieutis (Meyrick, 1908)
- Typhonia homopercna (Meyrick, 1920)
- Typhonia indigena (Meyrick, 1917)
- Typhonia interscissa (Meyrick, 1924)
- Typhonia inveterata (Meyrick, 1915)
- Typhonia linodyta (Meyrick, 1921)
- Typhonia liochra (Meyrick, 1908)
- Typhonia marmarodes (Meyrick, 1920)
- Typhonia mylica (Meyrick, 1908)
- Typhonia nectaritis (Meyrick, 1915)
- Typhonia nigrescens (Meyrick, 1920)
- Typhonia paraphrictis (Meyrick, 1908)
- Typhonia pelostrota (Meyrick, 1927)
- Typhonia petrodes (Meyrick, 1914)
- Typhonia picea (Meyrick, 1917)
- Typhonia salicoma (Meyrick, 1918)
- Typhonia stelitis (Meyrick, 1908)
- Typhonia stupea (Wallengren, 1875)
- Typhonia susurrans (Meyrick, 1911)
- Typhonia systolaea (Meyrick, 1908)
- Typhonia talaria (Meyrick, 1924)
- Typhonia tanyphaea (Meyrick, 1924)
- Typhonia tyrophanes (Meyrick, 1917)
- Zelomora phlyctidota Meyrick, 1920

== Family Pterophoridae ==
- Adaina gentilis Meyrick, 1911
- Adaina periarga Meyrick, 1913
- Agdistis africana Arenberger, 1996
- Agdistis arenbergeri Gielis, 1986
- Agdistis clara Arenberger, 1986
- Agdistis cretifera Meyrick, 1909
- Agdistis criocephala Meyrick, 1909
- Agdistis darwini Arenberger, 2009
- Agdistis dentalis Arenberger, 1986
- Agdistis dicksoni Kovtunovich & Ustjuzhanin, 2009
- Agdistis dimetra Meyrick, 1924
- Agdistis eberti Arenberger, 2009
- Agdistis endrodyi Kovtunovich & Ustjuzhanin, 2009
- Agdistis furcata Arenberger, 1996
- Agdistis gibberipennis Arenberger, 1996
- Agdistis infumata Meyrick, 1912
- Agdistis jansei Kovtunovich & Ustjuzhanin, 2009
- Agdistis karischi Arenberger, 1996
- Agdistis krooni Kovtunovich & Ustjuzhanin, 2009
- Agdistis kruegeri Kovtunovich & Ustjuzhanin, 2009
- Agdistis lomholdti Gielis, 1990
- Agdistis malitiosa Meyrick, 1909
- Agdistis malleana Arenberger, 1988
- Agdistis meyi Arenberger, 2008
- Agdistis obstinata Meyrick, 1920
- Agdistis piccolo Arenberger, 1986
- Agdistis potgieteri Kovtunovich & Ustjuzhanin, 2009
- Agdistis pustulalis Walker, 1864
- Agdistis quagga Arenberger, 2009
- Agdistis reciprocans Meyrick, 1924
- Agdistis spinosa Arenberger, 1986
- Agdistis tamaricis (Zeller, 1847)
- Agdistis tsumkwe Arenberger, 2001
- Agdistis unguica Arenberger, 1986
- Agdistis varii Kovtunovich & Ustjuzhanin, 2009
- Amblyptilia direptalis (Walker, 1864)
- Apoxyptilus anthites (Meyrick, 1936)
- Arcoptilia pongola Ustjuzhanin & Kovtunovich, 2010
- Buckleria vanderwolfi Gielis, 2008
- Cosmoclostis brachybela T. B. Fletcher, 1947
- Eucapperia bullifera (Meyrick, 1918)
- Exelastis atomosa (Walsingham, 1885)
- Exelastis crepuscularis (Meyrick, 1909)
- Exelastis pavidus (Meyrick, 1889)
- Exelastis tenax (Meyrick, 1913)
- Gypsochares aulotes (Meyrick, 1911)
- Gypsochares catharotes (Meyrick, 1908)
- Gypsochares londti Ustjuzhanin & Kovtunovich, 2010
- Hellinsia acuminatus (Meyrick, 1920)
- Hellinsia adumbratus (Walsingham, 1881)
- Hellinsia ammonias (Meyrick, 1909)
- Hellinsia callidus (Meyrick, 1913)
- Hellinsia colubratus (Meyrick, 1909)
- Hellinsia furfurosus (Meyrick, 1911)
- Hellinsia illutus (Meyrick, 1917)
- Hellinsia invidiosus (Meyrick, 1911)
- Hellinsia lienigianus (Zeller, 1852)
- Hellinsia pacifica (Meyrick, 1911)
- Hellinsia purus (Meyrick, 1913)
- Hellinsia serpens (Meyrick, 1909)
- Hellinsia sordidatus (Meyrick, 1912)
- Hellinsia sphenites (Meyrick, 1913)
- Hellinsia timidus (Meyrick, 1908)
- Hellinsia tripunctatus (Walsingham, 1881)
- Hepalastis pumilio (Zeller, 1873)
- Macrotinactis stenodactylus (T. B. Fletcher, 1911)
- Marasmarcha bonaespei (Walsingham, 1881)
- Marasmarcha verax (Meyrick, 1909)
- Megalorhipida leptomeres (Meyrick, 1886)
- Megalorhipida leucodactylus (Fabricius, 1794)
- Oxyptilus erythrodactylus T. B. Fletcher, 1911
- Oxyptilus variegatus Meyrick, 1920
- Oxyptilus vibrans Meyrick, 1921
- Picardia orchatias (Meyrick, 1908)
- Platyptilia amphiloga Meyrick, 1909
- Platyptilia barbarae Ustjuzhanin & Kovtunovich, 2010
- Platyptilia corniculata Meyrick, 1913
- Platyptilia empedota Meyrick, 1908
- Platyptilia maligna Meyrick, 1913
- Platyptilia molopias Meyrick, 1906
- Platyptilia odiosa Meyrick, 1924
- Platyptilia patriarcha Meyrick, 1912
- Platyptilia periacta Meyrick, 1910
- Platyptilia sabius (Felder & Rogenhofer, 1875)
- Pselnophorus astragalotes Meyrick, 1909
- Pselnophorus pachyceros Meyrick, 1921
- Pselnophorus zulu Ustjuzhanin & Kovtunovich, 2010
- Pseudoxyptilus secutor (Meyrick, 1911)
- Pterophorus africanus Ustjuzhanin & Kovtunovich, 2010
- Pterophorus albidus (Zeller, 1852)
- Pterophorus candidalis (Walker, 1864)
- Pterophorus dallastai Gielis, 1991
- Pterophorus ischnodactyla (Treitschke, 1833)
- Pterophorus rhyparias (Meyrick, 1908)
- Sphenarches anisodactylus (Walker, 1864)
- Sphenarches caffer (Zeller, 1851)
- Stenodacma richardi Ustjuzhanin & Kovtunovich, 2010
- Stenodacma wahlbergi (Zeller, 1852)
- Stenoptilia johnistella Ustjuzhanin & Kovtunovich, 2010
- Stenoptilia longalis (Walker, 1864)
- Stenoptilia natalensis Ustjuzhanin & Kovtunovich, 2010
- Stenoptilia zophodactylus (Duponchel, 1840)
- Stenoptilodes taprobanes (Felder & Rogenhofer, 1875)
- Titanoptilus laniger Bigot, 1969
- Titanoptilus patellatus Meyrick, 1913
- Trichoptilus animosus Meyrick, 1921
- Trichoptilus cryphias Meyrick, 1912
- Trichoptilus festus Meyrick, 1920
- Trichoptilus maceratus Meyrick, 1909
- Trichoptilus negotiosus Meyrick, 1926
- Trichoptilus varius Meyrick, 1909
- Trichoptilus viduus Meyrick, 1917
- Trichoptilus vivax Meyrick, 1909

== Family Pyralidae ==
About 506 species - see: List of moths of South Africa (Pyralidae)

== Family Saturniidae ==
- Adafroptilum incana (Sonthonnax, 1899)
- Antistathmoptera daltonae Tams, 1935
- Antistathmoptera rectangulata Pinhey, 1968
- Argema mimosae (Boisduval, 1847)
- Aurivillius arata (Westwood, 1849)
- Aurivillius fusca (Rothschild, 1895)
- Bunaea alcinoe (Stoll, 1780)
- Bunaeopsis annabellae Lemaire & Rougeot, 1975
- Bunaeopsis arabella (Aurivillius, 1893)
- Bunaeopsis jacksoni (Jordan, 1908)
- Campimoptilum kuntzei (Dewitz, 1881)
- Cinabra hyperbius (Westwood, 1881)
- Cirina forda (Westwood, 1849)
- Decachorda fulvia (Druce, 1886)
- Eochroa trimenii Felder, 1874
- Epiphora bauhiniae (Guérin-Méneville, 1832)
- Epiphora manowensis (Gschwandner, 1923)
- Epiphora mythimnia (Westwood, 1849)
- Gonimbrasia anna (Maassen & Weymer, 1885)
- Gonimbrasia belina (Westwood, 1849)
- Gonimbrasia bubo (Bouvier, 1930)
- Gonimbrasia carnigiei (Janse, 1918)
- Gonimbrasia cytherea (Fabricius, 1775)
- Gonimbrasia perscitus (Darge, 1992)
- Gonimbrasia rectilineata (Sonthonnax, 1899)
- Gonimbrasia tyrrhea (Cramer, 1775)
- Gonimbrasia wahlbergii (Boisduval, 1847)
- Gonimbrasia zambesina (Walker, 1865)
- Gynanisa ata Strand, 1911
- Gynanisa maja (Klug, 1836)
- Gynanisa meridiei Darge, 2008
- Heniocha apollonia (Cramer, 1779)
- Heniocha dyops (Maassen, 1872)
- Heniocha marnois (Rogenhofer, 1891)
- Holocerina agomensis (Karsch, 1896)
- Holocerina smilax (Westwood, 1849)
- Imbrasia ertli Rebel, 1904
- Lobobunaea angasana (Westwood, 1849)
- Lobobunaea phaedusa (Drury, 1782)
- Ludia delegorguei (Boisduval, 1847)
- Ludia goniata Rothschild, 1907
- Ludia orinoptena Karsch, 1892
- Melanocera dargei Terral, 1991
- Melanocera menippe (Westwood, 1849)
- Micragone cana (Aurivillius, 1893)
- Micragone nubifera Bouvier, 1936
- Nudaurelia carnegiei Janse, 1918
- Nudaurelia gueinzii (Staudinger, 1872)
- Nudaurelia macrothyris (Rothschild, 1906)
- Orthogonioptilum adiegetum Karsch, 1892
- Pselaphelia flavivitta (Walker, 1862)
- Pseudaphelia apollinaris (Boisduval, 1847)
- Pseudimbrasia deyrollei (J. Thomson, 1858)
- Pseudobunaea epithyrena (Maassen & Weymer, 1885)
- Pseudobunaea irius (Fabricius, 1793)
- Pseudobunaea tyrrhena (Westwood, 1849)
- Rohaniella pygmaea (Maassen & Weymer, 1885)
- Tagoropsis flavinata (Walker, 1865)
- Urota sinope (Westwood, 1849)
- Usta terpsichore (Maassen & Weymer, 1885)
- Usta wallengrenii (C. & R. Felder, 1859)
- Vegetia dewitzi (Maassen & Weymer, 1885)
- Vegetia ducalis Jordan, 1922
- Vegetia grimmia (Geyer, 1831)

== Family Sematuridae ==
- Apoprogones hesperistis Hampson, 1903

== Family Sesiidae ==
- Alonina difformis Hampson, 1919
- Alonina rygchiiformis Walker, 1856
- Cabomina dracomontana de Freina, 2008
- Cabomina monicae de Freina, 2008
- Cabomina tsomoana de Freina, 2011
- Chamanthedon chalypsa Hampson, 1919
- Chamanthedon elymais (Druce, 1899)
- Chamanthedon heliostoma Meyrick, 1926
- Chamanthedon hilariformis (Walker, 1856)
- Chamanthedon leucopleura Hampson, 1919
- Chamanthedon ochracea (Walker, 1864)
- Chamanthedon tapeina Hampson, 1919
- Chamanthedon xanthopasta Hampson, 1919
- Grypopalpia iridescens Hampson, 1919
- Homogyna bartschi de Freina, 2011
- Homogyna endopyra (Hampson, 1910)
- Homogyna ignivittata Hampson, 1919
- Homogyna pyrophora Hampson, 1919
- Homogyna xanthophora (Hampson, 1910)
- Hypanthedon marisa (Druce, 1899)
- Melittia aureosquamata (Wallengren, 1863)
- Melittia ectothyris Hampson, 1919
- Melittia laniremis (Wallengren, 1860)
- Melittia natalensis Butler, 1874
- Melittia occidentalis Le Cerf, 1917
- Melittia oedipus Oberthür, 1878
- Melittia pyropis Hampson, 1919
- Melittia rufodorsa Hampson, 1910
- Melittia ursipes Walker, 1856
- Monopetalotaxis candescens (Felder, 1874)
- Monopetalotaxis doleriformis (Walker, 1856)
- Monopetalotaxis luteopunctata de Freina, 2011
- Monopetalotaxis pyrocraspis (Hampson, 1910)
- Paranthrene mesothyris Hampson, 1919
- Paranthrene pythes (Druce, 1899)
- Paranthrene sanguipennis Meyrick, 1926
- Pseudomelittia andraenipennis (Walker, 1856)
- Sura bicolor Le Cerf, 1917
- Sura melanochalcia (Le Cerf, 1917)
- Sura xylocopiformis Walker, 1856
- Synanthedon chromolaenae (Eichlin, 2009)
- Synanthedon flavipalpis (Hampson, 1910)
- Synanthedon mesochoriformis (Walker, 1856)
- Synanthedon monozona (Hampson, 1910)
- Synanthedon platyuriformis (Walker, 1856)
- Synanthedon pyrethra (Hampson, 1910)
- Synanthedon rhodia (Druce, 1899)
- Synanthedon semirufa (Felder, 1874)
- Synanthedon stenothyris (Meyrick, 1933)
- Synanthedon tipuliformis (Clerck, 1759)
- Thyranthrene adumbrata Bartsch, 2008
- Thyranthrene metazonata Hampson, 1919
- Tipulamima tricincta (Le Cerf, 1916)

== Family Somabrachyidae ==
- Parapsycharium paarlense Geertsema, 2000
- Psycharium barnardi Geertsema, 1998
- Psycharium kammanassiense Geertsema, 1998
- Psycharium montanum Geertsema, 1998
- Psycharium natalense Geertsema, 1998
- Psycharium pellucens Herrich-Schäffer, 1856

== Family Sphingidae ==
- Acherontia atropos (Linnaeus, 1758)
- Afroclanis calcareus (Rothschild & Jordan, 1907)
- Afroclanis neavi (Hampson, 1910)
- Agrius cingulata (Fabricius, 1775)
- Agrius convolvuli (Linnaeus, 1758)
- Andriasa contraria Walker, 1856
- Antinephele lunulata Rothschild & Jordan, 1903
- Antinephele maculifera Holland, 1889
- Atemnora westermannii (Boisduval, 1875)
- Basiothia aureata (Karsch, 1891)
- Basiothia charis (Boisduval, 1875)
- Basiothia medea (Fabricius, 1781)
- Basiothia schenki (Möschler, 1872)
- Batocnema africanus (Distant, 1899)
- Centroctena imitans (Butler, 1882)
- Cephonodes apus (Boisduval, 1833)
- Cephonodes hylas (Linnaeus, 1771)
- Cephonodes trochilus (Guérin-Méneville, 1843)
- Coelonia fulvinotata (Butler, 1875)
- Daphnis nerii (Linnaeus, 1758)
- Euchloron megaera (Linnaeus, 1758)
- Falcatula falcata (Rothschild & Jordan, 1903)
- Hippotion balsaminae (Walker, 1856)
- Hippotion celerio (Linnaeus, 1758)
- Hippotion eson (Cramer, 1779)
- Hippotion osiris (Dalman, 1823)
- Hippotion rosae (Butler, 1882)
- Hippotion roseipennis (Butler, 1882)
- Hoplistopus penricei Rothschild & Jordan, 1903
- Hyles livornica (Esper, 1780)
- Leptoclanis pulchra Rothschild & Jordan, 1903
- Leucophlebia afra Karsch, 1891
- Leucostrophus alterhirundo d'Abrera, 1987
- Likoma apicalis Rothschild & Jordan, 1903
- Litosphingia corticea Jordan, 1920
- Lophostethus dumolinii (Angas, 1849)
- Macroglossum trochilus (Hübner, 1823)
- Macropoliana natalensis (Butler, 1875)
- Microsphinx pumilum (Boisduval, 1875)
- Neoclanis basalis (Walker, 1866)
- Neopolyptychus compar (Rothschild & Jordan, 1903)
- Neopolyptychus convexus (Rothschild & Jordan, 1903)
- Nephele accentifera (Palisot de Beauvois, 1821)
- Nephele aequivalens (Walker, 1856)
- Nephele argentifera (Walker, 1856)
- Nephele bipartita Butler, 1878
- Nephele comma Hopffer, 1857
- Nephele lannini Jordan, 1926
- Nephele peneus (Cramer, 1776)
- Nephele rosae Butler, 1875
- Nephele vau (Walker, 1856)
- Odontosida magnificum (Rothschild, 1894)
- Odontosida pusillus (Felder, 1874)
- Oligographa juniperi (Boisduval, 1847)
- Pantophaea favillacea (Walker, 1866)
- Pantophaea oneili (Clark, 1925)
- Phylloxiphia metria (Jordan, 1920)
- Phylloxiphia punctum (Rothschild, 1907)
- Phylloxiphia vicina (Rothschild & Jordan, 1915)
- Platysphinx piabilis (Distant, 1897)
- Polyptychoides grayii (Walker, 1856)
- Polyptychopsis marshalli (Rothschild & Jordan, 1903)
- Polyptychus baxteri Rothschild & Jordan, 1908
- Polyptychus coryndoni Rothschild & Jordan, 1903
- Praedora leucophaea Rothschild & Jordan, 1903
- Praedora marshalli Rothschild & Jordan, 1903
- Praedora plagiata Rothschild & Jordan, 1903
- Pseudandriasa mutata (Walker, 1855)

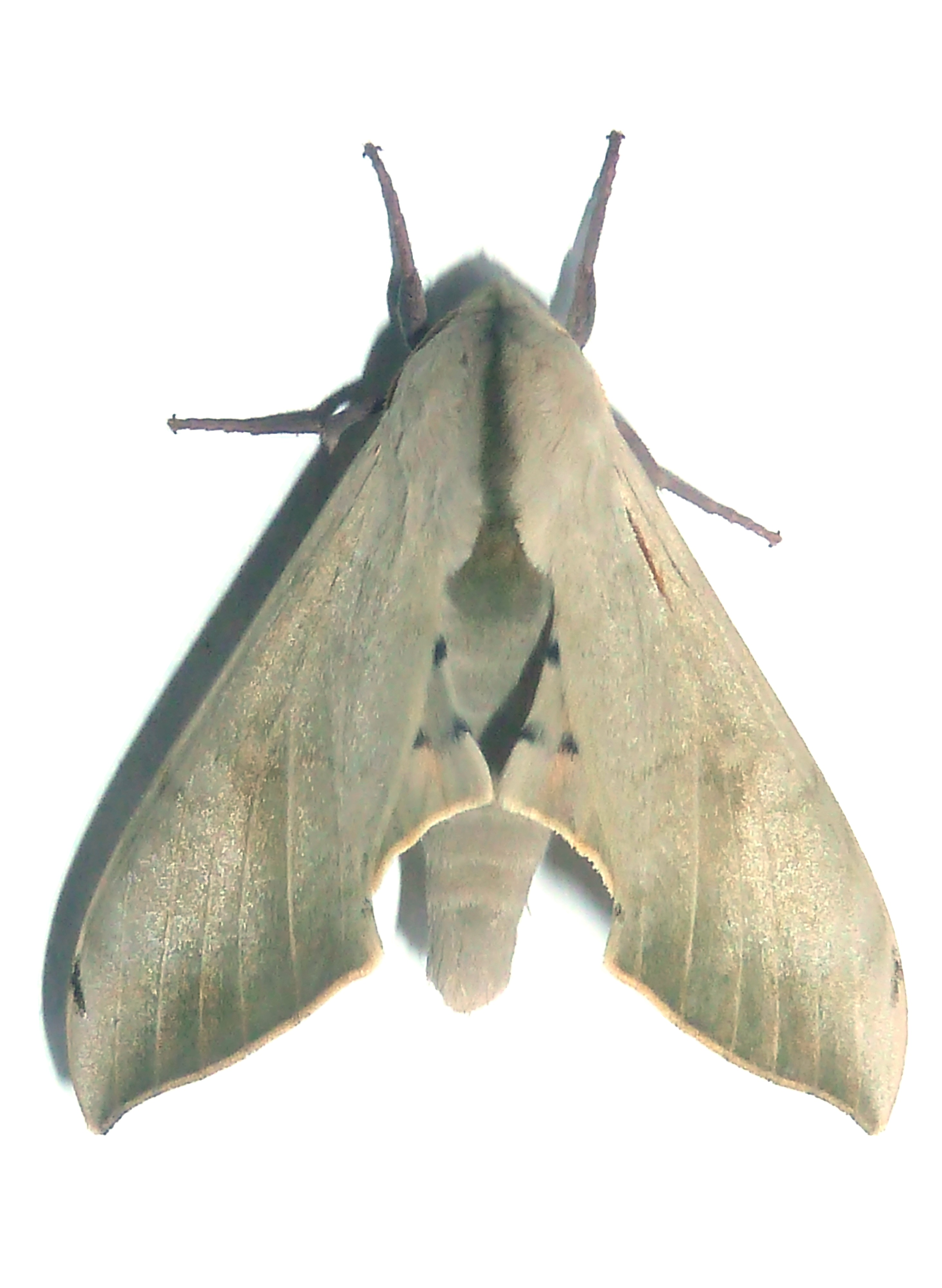
Pseudoclanis postica

- Pseudoclanis diana Gehlen, 1922
- Pseudoclanis molitor (Rothschild & Jordan, 1912)
- Pseudoclanis postica (Walker, 1856)
- Rhodafra marshalli Rothschild & Jordan, 1903
- Rhodafra opheltes (Cramer, 1780)
- Rufoclanis fulgurans (Rothschild & Jordan, 1903)
- Rufoclanis jansei (Vári, 1964)
- Rufoclanis numosae (Wallengren, 1860)
- Sphingonaepiopsis ansorgei Rothschild, 1904
- Sphingonaepiopsis nana (Walker, 1856)
- Temnora elegans (Rothschild, 1895)
- Temnora fumosa (Walker, 1856)
- Temnora funebris (Holland, 1893)
- Temnora iapygoides (Holland, 1889)
- Temnora inornatum (Rothschild, 1894)
- Temnora marginata (Walker, 1856)
- Temnora murina (Walker, 1856)
- Temnora namaqua Rothschild & Jordan, 1903
- Temnora natalis Walker, 1856
- Temnora plagiata Walker, 1856
- Temnora pseudopylas (Rothschild, 1894)
- Temnora pylades Rothschild & Jordan, 1903
- Temnora pylas (Cramer, 1779)
- Temnora robertsoni Carcasson, 1968
- Temnora sardanus (Walker, 1856)
- Temnora subapicalis Rothschild & Jordan, 1903
- Temnora swynnertoni Stevenson, 1938
- Temnora zantus (Herrich-Schäffer, 1854)
- Theretra cajus (Cramer, 1777)
- Theretra capensis (Linnaeus, 1764)
- Theretra jugurtha (Boisduval, 1875)
- Theretra monteironis (Butler, 1882)
- Theretra orpheus (Herrich-Schäffer, 1854)
- Xenosphingia jansei Jordan, 1920

== Family Thyrididae ==
- Arniocera auriguttata Hopffer, 1857
- Arniocera elata Jordan, 1915
- Arniocera erythropyga (Wallengren, 1860)
- Arniocera lugubris Gaede, 1926
- Arniocera zambesina (Walker, 1866)
- Banisia aldabrana (Fryer, 1912)
- Banisia jocatia (Whalley, 1971)
- Banisia myrsusalis (Walker, 1859)
- Banisia zamia (Whalley, 1971)
- Bupota galbana Whalley, 1971
- Bupota tranquilla Whalley, 1971
- Cecidothyris orbiferalis (Gaede, 1917)
- Cecidothyris pexa (Hampson, 1906)
- Chrysotypus dawsoni Distant, 1897
- Chrysotypus reticulatus Whalley, 1971
- Chrysotypus splendida (Warren, 1899)
- Chrysotypus subflavus Whalley, 1971
- Cornuterus nigropunctula (Pagenstecher, 1892)
- Dilophura caudata (Jordan, 1907)
- Dysodia antennata Whalley, 1968
- Dysodia binoculata Warren, 1901
- Dysodia constellata Warren, 1908
- Dysodia crassa (Walker, 1865)
- Dysodia fenestratella Warren, 1900
- Dysodia flavidula Warren, 1908
- Dysodia intermedia (Walker, 1865)
- Dysodia parvita Whalley, 1971
- Dysodia subsignata Warren, 1908
- Epaena candida Whalley, 1971
- Epaena danista Whalley, 1971
- Epaena trijuncta (Warren, 1898)
- Gnathodes helvella Whalley, 1971
- Hapana minima Whalley, 1971
- Hapana verticalis (Warren, 1899)
- Hypolamprus curviflua (Warren, 1898)
- Hypolamprus gangaba Whalley, 1971
- Kalenga ansorgei (Warren, 1899)
- Kalenga culanota Whalley, 1971
- Kalenga maculanota Whalley, 1971
- Kuja squamigera (Pagenstecher, 1892)
- Lelymena misalis Karsch, 1900
- Marmax smaragdina (Butler, 1888)
- Nakawa fuscibasis (Hampson, 1906)
- Nemea nivosa Whalley, 1971
- Netrocera hemichrysa (Hampson, 1910)
- Netrocera setioides Felder, 1874
- Rhodoneura abacha Whalley, 1971
- Rhodoneura disjuncta (Gaede, 1929)
- Rhodoneura flavicilia Hampson, 1906
- Rhodoneura lacunosa Whalley, 1971
- Rhodoneura roseola Whalley, 1971
- Rhodoneura serraticornis (Warren, 1899)
- Toosa glaucopiformis Walker, 1856

== Family Tineidae ==
- Acanthocheira loxopa (Meyrick, 1914)
- Acridotarsa melipecta (Meyrick, 1915)
- Amphixystis anchiala (Meyrick, 1909)
- Amphixystis syntricha (Meyrick, 1910)
- Antigambra amphitrocta Meyrick, 1927
- Asymphyla asperata (Meyrick, 1918)
- Ateliotum crymodes (Meyrick, 1908)
- Ceratophaga obnoxia (Meyrick, 1917)
- Ceratophaga tragoptila (Meyrick, 1917)
- Ceratophaga vastellus (Zeller, 1852)
- Ceratophaga xanthastis (Meyrick, 1908)
- Cimitra horridella (Walker, 1863)
- Cimitra spinignatha (Gozmány, 1968)
- Clepticodes horocentra Meyrick, 1927
- Contralissa catagrapta (Meyrick, 1927)
- Cosmeombra doxochares (Meyrick, 1926)
- Criticonoma chelonaea Meyrick, 1910
- Criticonoma flaveata (Gozmány, 1968)
- Crypsithyris fuscicoma Meyrick, 1937
- Crypsithyris spissa Meyrick, 1918
- Dasyses rugosella (Stainton, 1859)
- Dicanica acrocentra Meyrick, 1913
- Drosica abjectella Walker, 1963
- Dryadaula zygodes (Meyrick, 1918)
- Ectabola phaeocephala (Meyrick, 1918)
- Edosa audens (Meyrick, 1921)
- Edosa effulgens (Gozmány, 1965)
- Edosa gypsoptera (Gozmány, 1968)
- Edosa leucastis (Meyrick, 1908)
- Edosa lissochlora (Meyrick, 1921)
- Edosa oratrix (Meyrick, 1913)
- Edosa perinipha (Gozmány, 1968)
- Edosa rhodesica (Gozmány, 1967)
- Edosa sanctifica (Meyrick, 1921)
- Ellochotis caligata (Meyrick, 1913)
- Ellochotis exilis Gozmány & Vári, 1973
- Ellochotis fraudulenta (Meyrick, 1912)
- Ellochotis infausta Meyrick, 1920
- Ellochotis leontopa (Meyrick, 1908)
- Ellochotis opifica (Meyrick, 1908)
- Ellochotis picroxesta (Meyrick, 1926)
- Ellochotis purpurea (Stainton, 1860)
- Ellochotis territa (Meyrick, 1920)
- Ellochotis trophias (Meyrick, 1908)
- Ellochotis verecunda (Meyrick, 1911)
- Erechthias glossophora (Meyrick, 1926)
- Eriozancla trachyphaea (Meyrick, 1921)
- Exonomasis exolescens (Meyrick, 1926)
- Glaucostolella oxyteles (Meyrick, 1926)
- Graphidivalva genitalis (Meyrick, 1913)
- Hapsifera glebata Meyrick, 1908
- Hapsifera meliceris Meyrick, 1908
- Hapsifera ochroptila Meyrick, 1908
- Hapsifera pardalea Meyrick, 1908
- Harmaclona natalensis Bradley, 1953
- Homalopsycha pericharacta Meyrick, 1924
- Homalopsycha rapida (Meyrick, 1909)
- Hyperbola chloristis (Meyrick, 1908)
- Hyperbola phocina (Meyrick, 1908)
- Janseana sceptica (Meyrick, 1910)
- Janseana vibrata (Meyrick, 1913)
- Lindera tessellatella Blanchard, 1852
- Meessia sesquitertia (Meyrick, 1909)
- Miarotagmata penetrata (Meyrick, 1911)
- Minicorona tricarpa (Meyrick, 1913)
- Monopis crocicapitella (Clemens, 1859)
- Monopis lamprostola Meyrick, 1918
- Monopis megalodelta Meyrick, 1908
- Monopis meyricki Gozmány, 1967
- Monopis monachella (Hübner, 1796)
- Monopis nepheloscopa Meyrick, 1928
- Monopis persimilis Gozmány, 1965
- Monopis rejectella (Walker, 1864)
- Monopis rutilicostella (Stainton, 1860)
- Monopis speculella (Zeller, 1852)
- Monopis transeans Gozmány, 1965
- Morophaga soror Gozmány, 1965
- Myrmecozela isopsamma Meyrick, 1920
- Myrmecozela paurosperma Meyrick, 1926
- Myrmecozela pogonopis Meyrick, 1926
- Nearolyma pyrsocoma (Meyrick, 1937)
- Nemapogon granella (Linnaeus, 1758)
- Niditinea fuscella (Linnaeus, 1758)
- Nyctocyrmata crotalopis (Meyrick, 1921)
- Ochetoxena phaneraula Meyrick, 1920
- Ocnophilella autocrypta (Meyrick, 1926)
- Oinophila oxystyla (Meyrick, 1912)
- Oinophila v-flava (Haworth, 1828)
- Opogona chlorophanes Meyrick, 1908
- Opogona cyrtomis Meyrick, 1915
- Opogona dimidiatella Zeller, 1853
- Opogona harpalea Meyrick, 1911
- Opogona indiscreta (Meyrick, 1917)
- Opogona iricharis (Meyrick, 1926)
- Opogona ischnoscia Meyrick, 1928
- Opogona omiastis Meyrick, 1937
- Opogona omoscopa (Meyrick, 1893)
- Opogona phaeochalca Meyrick, 1908
- Opogona phaeocrana Meyrick, 1914
- Opogona pyrometalla (Meyrick, 1928)
- Opogona scaphopis Meyrick, 1909
- Opogona trophis Meyrick, 1913
- Organodesma erinacea (Walker, 1863)
- Oxymachaeris euryzancla Meyrick, 1918
- Oxymachaeris zulella (Walsingham, 1881)
- Paraptica concinerata Meyrick, 1917
- Pelecystola melanchares (Meyrick, 1937)
- Pelecystola tephrinitis (Meyrick, 1911)
- Perissomastix adamasta (Meyrick, 1909)
- Perissomastix caryocephala (Meyrick, 1937)
- Perissomastix damnificella (Zeller, 1852)
- Perissomastix dentifera Gozmány & Vári, 1973
- Perissomastix fulvicoma (Meyrick, 1921)
- Perissomastix holopsamma (Meyrick, 1908)
- Perissomastix mascherata Gozmány, 1965
- Perissomastix meretrix (Meyrick, 1908)
- Perissomastix nox Gozmány, 1968
- Perissomastix varii Gozmány, 1967
- Phaeoses pileigera (Meyrick, 1913)
- Phyciodyta neritis Meyrick, 1918
- Pitharcha fasciata (Ghesquière, 1940)
- Pringleophaga crozetensis Enderlein, 1905
- Pringleophaga kerguelensis Enderlein, 1905
- Pringleophaga tetraula (Meyrick, 1926)
- Propachyarthra convallata (Meyrick, 1918)
- Proterospastis antiphracta (Meyrick, 1909)
- Proterospastis barystacta Meyrick, 1937
- Proterospastis craurota (Meyrick, 1920)
- Proterospastis homestia (Meyrick, 1908)
- Proterospastis megaspila (Meyrick, 1913)
- Proterospastis taeniala (Gozmány, 1968)
- Proterospastis trilinguis (Meyrick, 1920)
- Proterospastis zebra (Walsingham, 1891)
- Prothinodes arvicola Meyrick, 1924
- Rhodobates paracosma (Meyrick, 1908)
- Setomorpha rutella Zeller, 1852
- Sphallestasis catharinae (Gozmány, 1968)
- Sphallestasis ectofurca (Gozmány, 1965)
- Sphallestasis euplocamis (Meyrick, 1918)
- Sphallestasis hyalodes (Meyrick, 1913)
- Sphallestasis jansei (Gozmány, 1965)
- Sphallestasis oenopis (Meyrick, 1908)
- Sphallestasis paramecis (Gozmány, 1969)
- Sphallestasis paraxena (Meyrick, 1908)
- Sphallestasis tanystis (Meyrick, 1908)
- Stemagoris axylaea Meyrick, 1911
- Struthisca agitata Meyrick, 1913
- Struthisca areata Meyrick, 1908
- Struthisca hormotris Meyrick, 1908
- Struthisca omichlodes Meyrick, 1908
- Tenaga nigripunctella (Haworth, 1828)
- Tetracladessa chalcoxesta (Meyrick, 1920)
- Theatrochora cosmophanes Meyrick, 1921
- Tinea abactella Walker, 1863
- Tinea dubiella Stainton, 1857
- Tinea encausta Meyrick, 1911
- Tinea nesiastis (Meyrick, 1911)
- Tinea pentametra Meyrick, 1921
- Tinea spilocoma Meyrick, 1920
- Tinea spinizona Gozmány, 1968
- Tinea squalida Gozmány, 1968
- Tinea translucens Meyrick, 1917
- Tinissa polystacta (Meyrick, 1918)
- Tiquadra goochii Walsingham, 1881
- Tiquadra lichenea Walsingham, 1897
- Tracheloteina arctocephala (Meyrick, 1909)
- Tracheloteina bilobata Gozmány, 1968
- Tracheloteina farraginella (Zeller, 1852)
- Tracheloteina ordinata (Meyrick, 1921)
- Tracheloteina peloplaca (Meyrick, 1917)
- Tracheloteina percastis (Meyrick, 1908)
- Tracheloteina spinipenis Gozmány, 1968
- Tracheloteina suspiciosa (Meyrick, 1912)
- Transmixta fortuita (Meyrick, 1920)
- Trichophaga cuspidata Gozmány, 1967
- Trichophaga tapetzella (Linnaeus, 1767)
- Wegneria speciosa (Meyrick, 1914)

== Family Tischeriidae ==
- Coptotriche africana Puplesis & Diskus, 2003
- Coptotriche basipectinella Puplesis & Diskus, 2003
- Tischeria martinkrugeri Puplesis & Diškus, 2003
- Tischeria sparmanniae Puplesis & Diškus, 2003
- Tischeria zestica Meyrick, 1911

== Family Tortricidae ==
About 240 species - see: List of moths of South Africa (Tortricidae)

== Family Uraniidae ==
- Acropteris illiturata Warren, 1897
- Dirades theclata (Guenée, 1858)
- Epiplema anomala Janse, 1932
- Epiplema asinina Warren, 1905
- Epiplema illineata Warren, 1899
- Epiplema inconspicua Janse, 1932
- Epiplema pulveralis Janse, 1932
- Epiplema reducta Janse, 1932
- Epiplema tristis Janse, 1932
- Heteroplema dependens Warren, 1902
- Hypoplema fumella Janse, 1932
- Leucoplema ansorgei (Warren, 1901)
- Leucoplema dohertyi (Warren, 1904)
- Leucoplema triumbrata (Warren, 1902)
- Monoplema fumigera (Warren, 1905)
- Pseudodirades lactea (Warren, 1897)
- Urapteritra falcifera (Weymer, 1892)

== Family Xyloryctidae ==
- Cladophantis pristina Meyrick, 1925
- Cladophantis spilozeucta Meyrick, 1927
- Cladophantis xylophracta Meyrick, 1918
- Eporycta chionaula Meyrick, 1920
- Eporycta incanescens Meyrick, 1921
- Eporycta tarbalea Meyrick, 1908
- Eretmocera contermina Meyrick, 1926
- Eretmocera derogatella (Walker, 1864)
- Eretmocera florifera Meyrick, 1909
- Eretmocera fuscipennis Zeller, 1852
- Eretmocera laetissima Zeller, 1852
- Eretmocera lunifera Zeller, 1852
- Eretmocera miniata Walsingham, 1889
- Eretmocera monophaea Meyrick, 1927
- Eretmocera scatospila Zeller, 1852
- Eretmocera syleuta Meyrick, 1926
- Eupetochira axysta Meyrick, 1927
- Eupetochira xystopala (Meyrick, 1908)
- Exacristis euryopa Meyrick, 1921
- Gemorodes diclera Meyrick, 1925
- Glycynympha roseocostella (Walsingham, 1881)
- Microphidias bacteriopis Meyrick, 1937
- Paralogistis ochrura Meyrick, 1913
- Proterochyta epicoena (Meyrick, 1914)
- Scythris accumulata Meyrick, 1914
- Scythris anthracodelta Meyrick, 1911
- Scythris aquaria Meyrick, 1913
- Scythris brachyplecta Meyrick, 1928
- Scythris calciflua Meyrick, 1921
- Scythris canispersa Meyrick, 1913
- Scythris chloraema (Meyrick, 1887)
- Scythris cometa Meyrick, 1909
- Scythris cretiflua Meyrick, 1913
- Scythris delodelta Meyrick, 1930
- Scythris dimensa Meyrick, 1920
- Scythris eloquens Meyrick, 1921
- Scythris erudita Meyrick, 1917
- Scythris exsoluta Meyrick, 1920
- Scythris faeculenta Meyrick, 1912
- Scythris farrata Meyrick, 1913
- Scythris fluctuosa Meyrick, 1914
- Scythris fonticola Meyrick, 1911
- Scythris glaphyropa Meyrick, 1914
- Scythris justifica Meyrick, 1911
- Scythris lactanea Meyrick, 1913
- Scythris latebrosa Meyrick, 1913
- Scythris melanodora Meyrick, 1912
- Scythris melanopleura Meyrick, 1914
- Scythris meligastra Meyrick, 1920
- Scythris mesoplecta Meyrick, 1921
- Scythris nigrispersa Meyrick, 1918
- Scythris obstans Meyrick, 1928
- Scythris ochrantha Meyrick, 1909
- Scythris pelochyta Meyrick, 1909
- Scythris psamathota Meyrick, 1913
- Scythris rivigera Meyrick, 1911
- Scythris roseola Meyrick, 1912
- Scythris sacharissa Meyrick, 1913
- Scythris stagnosa Meyrick, 1913
- Xylorycta artigena Meyrick, 1914

== Family Yponomeutidae ==
- Abacistis hexanoma Meyrick, 1913
- Abacistis teligera Meyrick, 1914
- Acrataula catapachna Meyrick, 1921
- Amalthina lacteata Meyrick, 1914
- Argyresthia liparodes Meyrick, 1914
- Argyresthia pentanoma Meyrick, 1913
- Argyresthia stilpnota Meyrick, 1913
- Atteva carteri (Walsingham, 1891)
- Embryonopsis halticella Eaton, 1875
- Exaulistis trichogramma Meyrick, 1911
- Hesperarcha pericentra Meyrick, 1918
- Morotripta fatigata Meyrick, 1917
- Palaetheta innocua Meyrick, 1911
- Palaetheta ischnozona Meyrick, 1909
- Parazelota dryotoma Meyrick, 1913
- Parexaula isomima Meyrick, 1909
- Plexippica verberata Meyrick, 1912
- Prays citri (Millière, 1873)
- Prays liophaea Meyrick, 1927
- Ptiloteina nigricola (Meyrick, 1912)
- Steganosticha remigera Meyrick, 1921
- Teinoptila puncticornis (Walsingham, 1891)
- Trochastica albifrenis Meyrick, 1913
- Xyrosaris secreta Meyrick, 1912
- Yponomeuta africanus Stainton, 1860
- Yponomeuta athyris Meyrick, 1928
- Yponomeuta fumigatus Zeller, 1852
- Yponomeuta sistrophora Meyrick, 1909
- Yponomeuta strigillatus Zeller, 1852
- Yponomeuta subplumbellus Walsingham, 1881
- Zygographa asaphochalca Meyrick, 1917

== Family Ypsolophidae ==
- Ypsolopha exsularis (Meyrick, 1937)
- Ypsolopha scenites (Meyrick, 1909)

== Family Zygaenidae ==
- Anticrates crocophaea Meyrick, 1921
- Anticrates electropis Meyrick, 1921
- Astyloneura glennia (Jordan, 1907)
- Astyloneura meridionalis (Hampson, 1920)
- Astyloneura trefurthi Gaede, 1914
- Coptoproctis languida (Zeller, 1852)
- Janseola titaea (Druce, 1896)
- Malamblia durbanica Jordan, 1907
- Neurosymploca affinis Jordan, 1907
- Neurosymploca caffra (Linnaeus, 1764)
- Neurosymploca concinna (Dalman, 1823)
- Neurosymploca hottentota (Herrich-Schäffer, 1854)
- Neurosymploca meterythra Hampson, 1920
- Neurosymploca pagana Kirby, 1892
- Orna contraria (Walker, 1854)
- Orna nebulosa (Guérin-Méneville, 1832)
- Praezygaena agria (Distant, 1892)
- Praezygaena conjuncta (Hampson, 1920)
- Praezygaena lateralis (Jordan, 1907)
- Praezygaena microsticha (Jordan, 1907)
- Praezygaena myodes (Druce, 1899)
- Praezygaena ochroptera (Felder, 1874)
- Saliunca assimilis Jordan, 1907
- Saliunca homochroa (Holland, 1897)
- Saliunca meruana Aurivillius, 1910
- Saliunca styx (Fabricius, 1775)
- Saliuncella marshalli Jordan, 1907
- Tascia finalis (Walker, 1854)
- Tascia rhabdophora Vári, 2002
- Tascia virescens Butler, 1876
- Zutulba namaqua (Boisduval, 1847)
- Zutulba ocellaris (Felder, 1874)

== See also ==
- List of butterflies of South Africa
- Wildlife of South Africa
