= Scythris fonticola =

Scientific classification
- Kingdom: Animalia
- Phylum: Arthropoda
- Class: Insecta
- Order: Lepidoptera
- Family: Scythrididae
- Genus: Scythris
- Species: S. fonticola

Binomial name
- Scythris fonticola Meyrick, 1911

Synonyms
- Scythris jonticola

Species of moth

Scythris anthracodelta is a moth of the family Scythrididae. It was described by Edward Meyrick in 1911. It is found in Namibia and South Africa (Limpopo).

The wingspan is about 13 mm. The forewings are grey, with a faint purplish tinge. The stigmata are represented by very obscure spots of darker suffusion, the discal approximated, the plical obliquely before the first discal. There is a rather broad white sub-median streak from the base (where it extends suffusedly to the basal portion of the dorsum) to the first discal stigma, impressed beneath by the plical, and continued by some scattered white scales to and around the second discal. There is also a suffused white dot at the apex. The hindwings are grey.
