= Scythris sacharissa =

Scientific classification
- Kingdom: Animalia
- Phylum: Arthropoda
- Class: Insecta
- Order: Lepidoptera
- Family: Scythrididae
- Genus: Scythris
- Species: S. sacharissa

Binomial name
- Scythris sacharissa Meyrick, 1913

Species of moth

Scythris sacharissa is a moth of the family Scythrididae. It was described by Edward Meyrick in 1913. It is found in South Africa.

The wingspan is about 13 mm. The forewings are rather dark grey with a broad rosy-ochreous-whitish median longitudinal streak from the base to the termen, emitting a fine line beneath from beyond its middle. The veins on the costal area above this are marked by fine rosy-ochreous-whitish lines and there are similar indistinct dorsal and subdorsal lines, confluent towards the base, but becoming obsolete posteriorly. The hindwings are rather dark grey, darker posteriorly.
