= Stenoma dicentra =

Scientific classification
- Kingdom: Animalia
- Phylum: Arthropoda
- Class: Insecta
- Order: Lepidoptera
- Family: Depressariidae
- Genus: Stenoma
- Species: S. dicentra

Binomial name
- Stenoma dicentra Meyrick, 1913

Species of moth

Stenoma dicentra is a moth in the family Depressariidae. It was described by Edward Meyrick in 1913. It is found in South Africa.

The wingspan is about 16 mm. The forewings are pale glossy fuscous with the plical and second discal stigmata rather large and blackish. The hindwings and cilia are fuscous whitish.
