= Lecithocera binotata =

Scientific classification
- Kingdom: Animalia
- Phylum: Arthropoda
- Class: Insecta
- Order: Lepidoptera
- Family: Lecithoceridae
- Genus: Lecithocera
- Species: L. binotata

Binomial name
- Lecithocera binotata Meyrick, 1918

Species of moth in the genus Lecithocera

Lecithocera binotata is a moth in the family Lecithoceridae. It was described by Edward Meyrick in 1918. It is found in South Africa.

The wingspan is about 11 mm. The forewings are fuscous sprinkled with dark fuscous. The discal stigmata are rather large and blackish. The hindwings are grey.
