= Glycynympha =

Scientific classification
- Domain: Eukaryota
- Kingdom: Animalia
- Phylum: Arthropoda
- Class: Insecta
- Order: Lepidoptera
- Family: Xyloryctidae
- Genus: Glycynympha; Meyrick, 1925
- Species: G. roseocostella

Binomial name
- Glycynympha roseocostella (Walsingham, 1881)

Synonyms
- Cryptolechia roseocostella Walsingham, 1881; Epimactis sandycopa Meyrick, 1917

Monotypic moth genus in family Xyloryctidae

Glycynympha roseocostella is a moth in the family Xyloryctidae, and the only species in the genus Glycynympha. The species was described, as Cryptolechia roseocostella, by Thomas de Grey, 6th Baron Walsingham in 1881 and is found in South Africa. The genus was established by Edward Meyrick in 1925.

The wingspan is about 16 mm. The forewings are white, the costa narrowly bright rose-colour, having, slightly beyond its middle, a triangular pale brown patch, of which the apex is produced in an attenuated and angulated streak to the end of the cell, reaching about half-way across the wing. The apical margin is also pale brown, the space occupied by this colour clearly defined and attenuated towards the anal angle. A pale brown shade lies along the base of the dorsal margin. The hindwings are white.
