= Stenoma reticens =

Scientific classification
- Kingdom: Animalia
- Phylum: Arthropoda
- Class: Insecta
- Order: Lepidoptera
- Family: Depressariidae
- Genus: Stenoma
- Species: S. reticens

Binomial name
- Stenoma reticens Meyrick, 1917

Species of moth

Stenoma reticens is a moth in the family Depressariidae. It was first described by Edward Meyrick in 1917. It is found in Bengal, southern India and South Africa.

The wingspan is 13–16 mm. The forewings are light glossy greyish ochreous, greyer in females. The stigmata are dark fuscous, the plical and first discal minute and indistinct, the plical rather obliquely beyond the first discal, the second discal moderate. The hindwings are pale grey in males and whitish grey in females.
