= Scythris glaphyropa =

Scientific classification
- Kingdom: Animalia
- Phylum: Arthropoda
- Class: Insecta
- Order: Lepidoptera
- Family: Scythrididae
- Genus: Scythris
- Species: S. glaphyropa

Binomial name
- Scythris glaphyropa Meyrick, 1914

Species of moth

Scythris glaphyropa is a moth of the family Scythrididae. It was described by Edward Meyrick in 1914. It is found in Mpumalanga, South Africa.

The wingspan is about 13 mm. The forewings are glossy dark lilac-grey bronze with two very obscure blackish dots transversely placed in the disc at two-fifths. The hindwings and cilia are dark grey.
