= Exacristis =

Scientific classification
- Kingdom: Animalia
- Phylum: Arthropoda
- Class: Insecta
- Order: Lepidoptera
- Family: Xyloryctidae
- Genus: Exacristis; Meyrick, 1921
- Species: E. euryopa

Binomial name
- Exacristis euryopa Meyrick, 1921

Monotypic moth genus in family Xyloryctidae

Exacristis euryopa is a moth in the family Xyloryctidae, and the only species in the genus Exacristis. The genus and species were both described by Edward Meyrick in 1921 and are found in South Africa.

The wingspan is about 18 mm. The forewings are ochreous-whitish with the discal stigmata widely remote and black. The costal edge is shortly blackish towards the apex. The hindwings are light grey, the apex tinged with ochreous-whitish.
