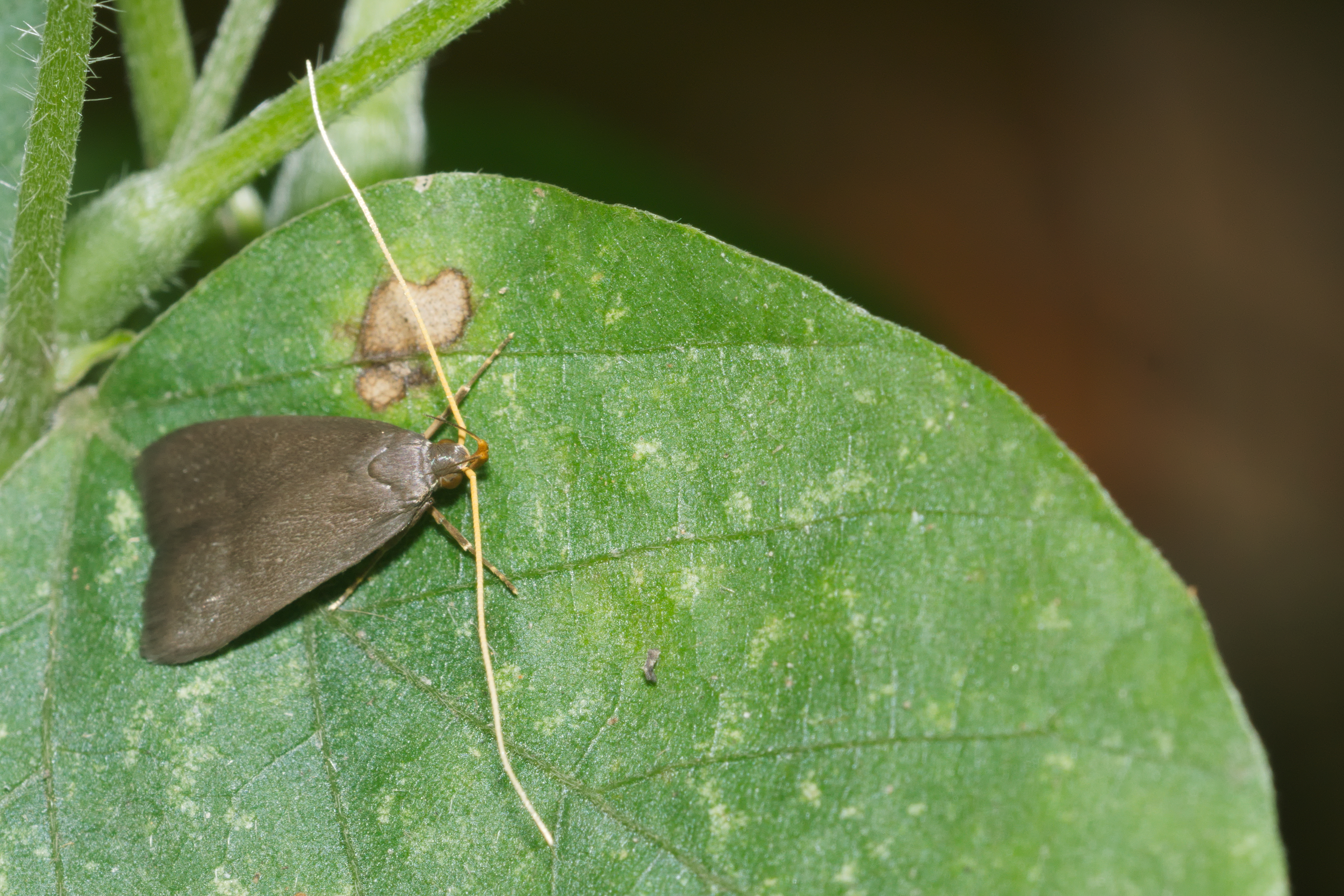

Scientific classification
- Kingdom: Animalia
- Phylum: Arthropoda
- Clade: Pancrustacea
- Class: Insecta
- Order: Lepidoptera
- Family: Lecithoceridae
- Subfamily: Lecithocerinae; Gozmány, 1978

= Lecithocerinae =

Subfamily of moths

The Lecithocerinae are a subfamily of small moths in the family Lecithoceridae. They are found worldwide, but most species occur in South Asia. The subfamily is characterized by the male genitalia with a bridge-like structure connecting the tegumen and the valva, and the uncus almost always is vestigial with two lobes at the dorsal base, only exceptionally united into a broad plate, but never as a thorn or spine.

Older classifications have treated the family Lecithoceridae as subfamily Lecithocerinae of Gelechiidae.

== Taxonomy and systematics ==
- Achoria Meyrick, 1904
- Amaloxestis Gozmány, 1971
- Atrichozancla Janse, 1954
- Carodista Meyrick, 1925
- Crinellus Park, 2012
- Crocogma Meyrick, 1918
- Dinochares Meyrick, 1925
- Dolichotorna Meyrick, 1910
- Doxogenes Meyrick, 1925
- Dragmatucha Meyrick, 1908
- Eridachtha Meyrick, 1910
- Eurodachtha Gozmány in Amsel et al., 1978
- Frisilia Walker, 1864
- Hamatina Park, 2011
- Heteralcis Meyrick, 1925
- Heterodeltis Meyrick, 1925
- Hoenea Gozmány, 1970
- Homaloxestis Meyrick, 1910
- Ilioparsis Gozmány, 1973
- Issikiopteryx Moriuti, 1973
- Kalocyrma Wu, 1994
- Lacuniola Park, 2012
- Lecithocera Herrich-Schäffer, 1853
- Lecitholaxa Gozmány in Amsel et al., 1978
- Mnesteria Meyrick, 1910
- Neocorodes Meyrick, 1923
- Neopectinimura Park in Park & Byun, 2010
- Neotimyra Park, 2011
- Nosphistica Meyrick, 1911
- Onnuria Park, 2011
- Oxygnostis Meyrick, 1925
- Parelliptis Meyrick, 1910
- Pectinimura Park in Park & Byun, 2008
- Procharista Meyrick, 1922
- Protolychnis Meyrick, 1925
- Pseudocrates Meyrick, 1918
- Rhizosthenes Meyrick in Caradja & Meyrick, 1935
- Sarisophora Meyrick, 1904
- Scolizona Park, 2011
- Scythropiodes Matsumura, 1931
- Siderostigma Gozmány, 1973
- Spatulignatha Gozmány in Amsel et al., 1978
- Strombiola Park, 2011
- Synersaga Gozmány in Amsel et al., 1978
- Sulciolus Park, 2012
- Technographa Meyrick, 1925
- Tegenocharis Gozmány, 1973
- Telephata Meyrick, 1916
- Teucrodoxa Meyrick, 1925
- Thailepidonia Park, 2007
- Timyra Walker, 1864
- Tisis Walker, 1864
- Trichoboscis Meyrick, 1929
- Woonpaikia Park, 2010
