= Nosphistica metalychna =

Scientific classification
- Kingdom: Animalia
- Phylum: Arthropoda
- Class: Insecta
- Order: Lepidoptera
- Family: Lecithoceridae
- Genus: Nosphistica
- Species: N. metalychna

Binomial name
- Nosphistica metalychna (Meyrick, 1935)

Synonyms
- Philoptila metalychna Meyrick, 1935

Species of moth

Nosphistica metalychna is a moth in the family Lecithoceridae. It was described by Edward Meyrick in 1935. It is known from southern China.
