= Pectinimura montiatilis =

Scientific classification
- Kingdom: Animalia
- Phylum: Arthropoda
- Class: Insecta
- Order: Lepidoptera
- Family: Lecithoceridae
- Genus: Pectinimura
- Species: P. montiatilis

Binomial name
- Pectinimura montiatilis Park and Byun, 2008

Species of moth

Pectinimura montiatilis is a moth in the family Lecithoceridae. It is found in Palawan province of the Philippines.

The wingspan is 15–16 mm.
