= Telephata cheramopis =

Scientific classification
- Kingdom: Animalia
- Phylum: Arthropoda
- Class: Insecta
- Order: Lepidoptera
- Family: Lecithoceridae
- Genus: Telephata
- Species: T. cheramopis

Binomial name
- Telephata cheramopis Meyrick, 1916

Species of moth

Telephata cheramopis is a moth in the family Lecithoceridae. It was described by Edward Meyrick in 1916. It is found on New Guinea.

The wingspan is 14–15 mm. The forewings are ochreous white with a rather elongate blackish spot on the base of the costa. The stigmata are represented by black spots, the first discal round, the plical smaller and ovate, directly beneath it, the second discal large and transverse-oval. There are three or four indistinct cloudy marginal fuscous dots around the apex. The hindwings are rather dark grey.
