= Sulciolus circulivalvae =

Scientific classification
- Kingdom: Animalia
- Phylum: Arthropoda
- Clade: Pancrustacea
- Class: Insecta
- Order: Lepidoptera
- Family: Lecithoceridae
- Genus: Sulciolus
- Species: S. circulivalvae

Binomial name
- Sulciolus circulivalvae Park, 2012

Species of moth

Sulciolus circulivalvae is a moth in the family Lecithoceridae. It was described by Kyu-Tek Park in 2012. It is found on New Guinea.
