= Pectinimura batubatuensis =

Scientific classification
- Kingdom: Animalia
- Phylum: Arthropoda
- Class: Insecta
- Order: Lepidoptera
- Family: Lecithoceridae
- Genus: Pectinimura
- Species: P. batubatuensis

Binomial name
- Pectinimura batubatuensis Park and Byun, 2008

Species of moth

Pectinimura batubatuensis is a moth in the family Lecithoceridae. It is found on the Philippines (Batu Batu).

The wingspan is 15–16 mm. The forewings and hindwings are dark brown.
