= Woonpaikia =

Scientific classification
- Kingdom: Animalia
- Phylum: Arthropoda
- Class: Insecta
- Order: Lepidoptera
- Family: Lecithoceridae
- Subfamily: Lecithocerinae
- Genus: Woonpaikia; Park, 2010

Genus of moths

Woonpaikia is a genus of moths in the family Lecithoceridae. The genus was erected by Kyu-Tek Park in 2010.

== Species ==
- Woonpaikia angoonae Park, 2010
- Woonpaikia imperspicua Yu & Wang, 2024
- Woonpaikia similangoonae Yu & Wang, 2024
- Woonpaikia villosa Park, 2010
