= Nosphistica parameocola =

Scientific classification
- Domain: Eukaryota
- Kingdom: Animalia
- Phylum: Arthropoda
- Class: Insecta
- Order: Lepidoptera
- Family: Lecithoceridae
- Genus: Nosphistica
- Species: N. parameocola

Binomial name
- Nosphistica parameocola (Wu, 1996)

Synonyms
- Athymoris parameocola Wu, 1996

Species of moth

Nosphistica parameocola is a moth in the family Lecithoceridae. It is found in Taiwan and southern China (Hainan).
