= Siderostigma symbolica =

Scientific classification
- Kingdom: Animalia
- Phylum: Arthropoda
- Clade: Pancrustacea
- Class: Insecta
- Order: Lepidoptera
- Family: Lecithoceridae
- Genus: Siderostigma
- Species: S. symbolica

Binomial name
- Siderostigma symbolica Gozmány, 1973

Species of moth

Siderostigma symbolica is a moth in the family Lecithoceridae. It was described by László Anthony Gozmány in 1973. It is found in Nepal.
