= Pectinimura lutescens =

Scientific classification
- Domain: Eukaryota
- Kingdom: Animalia
- Phylum: Arthropoda
- Class: Insecta
- Order: Lepidoptera
- Family: Lecithoceridae
- Genus: Pectinimura
- Species: P. lutescens

Binomial name
- Pectinimura lutescens (Diakonoff, 1954)

Synonyms
- Lecithocera lutescens Diakonoff, 1954

Species of moth

Pectinimura lutescens is a moth in the family Lecithoceridae. It is found in Papua New Guinea.

The length of the forewings is about 10.5 mm.
