= Dolichotorna =

Scientific classification
- Kingdom: Animalia
- Phylum: Arthropoda
- Class: Insecta
- Order: Lepidoptera
- Family: Lecithoceridae
- Subfamily: Lecithocerinae
- Genus: Dolichotorna; Meyrick, 1910
- Species: D. tholias

Binomial name
- Dolichotorna tholias Meyrick, 1910

Synonyms
- Dolichotorna hotlias Meyrick, 1910

Genus of moths

Dolichotorna is a genus of moth in the family Lecithoceridae. It contains the species Dolichotorna tholias, which is found in Sri Lanka.

The wingspan is 13–14 mm. The forewings are brownish, somewhat mixed or in males mostly suffused with ochreous-whitish, somewhat sprinkled with dark fuscous. There are very undefined markings formed by darker fuscous suffusion coarsely irrorated with blackish-fuscous: a streak along the submedian fold, a cloudy patch in the disc beyond the middle, and a patch occupying the apical fourth of the wing. The hindwings are pale whitish-ochreous in males and whitish-grey in females.
