= Procharista ranongensis =

Scientific classification
- Kingdom: Animalia
- Phylum: Arthropoda
- Clade: Pancrustacea
- Class: Insecta
- Order: Lepidoptera
- Family: Lecithoceridae
- Genus: Procharista
- Species: P. ranongensis

Binomial name
- Procharista ranongensis Park, 2009

Species of moth

Procharista ranongensis is a moth in the family Lecithoceridae. It was described by Kyu-Tek Park in 2009. It is found in Thailand.

The wingspan is about 13.5 mm. The forewings are uniform yellowish brown. The hindwings are uniform clothed.

== Etymology ==
The species name is derived from the type locality.
