= Pectinimura rhabdostoma =

Scientific classification
- Domain: Eukaryota
- Kingdom: Animalia
- Phylum: Arthropoda
- Class: Insecta
- Order: Lepidoptera
- Family: Lecithoceridae
- Genus: Pectinimura
- Species: P. rhabdostoma

Binomial name
- Pectinimura rhabdostoma (Diakonoff, 1954)

Synonyms
- Lecithocera rhabdostoma Diakonoff, 1954

Species of moth

Pectinimura rhabdostoma is a moth in the family Lecithoceridae. It is found in Papua New Guinea.

The length of the forewings is 6–7 mm. The forewings have distinct, large blackish stigmata.
