= Synersaga atriptera =

Scientific classification
- Domain: Eukaryota
- Kingdom: Animalia
- Phylum: Arthropoda
- Class: Insecta
- Order: Lepidoptera
- Family: Lecithoceridae
- Genus: Synersaga
- Species: S. atriptera

Binomial name
- Synersaga atriptera (Xu & Wang, 2014)

Synonyms
- Synersaga atriptera Xu & Wang, 2014

Species of moth

Synersaga atriptera is a moth in the family Lecithoceridae. It is found in China (Guangdong).

The wingspan is 29–31 mm.
