= Synersaga pseudocathra =

Scientific classification
- Domain: Eukaryota
- Kingdom: Animalia
- Phylum: Arthropoda
- Class: Insecta
- Order: Lepidoptera
- Family: Lecithoceridae
- Genus: Synersaga
- Species: S. pseudocathra

Binomial name
- Synersaga pseudocathra (Diakonoff, 1951)

Synonyms
- Lecithocera pseudocathra Diakonoff, 1951

Species of moth

Synersaga pseudocathra is a moth in the family Lecithoceridae. It is found in Myanmar.
