= Strombiola =

Scientific classification
- Kingdom: Animalia
- Phylum: Arthropoda
- Class: Insecta
- Order: Lepidoptera
- Family: Lecithoceridae
- Subfamily: Lecithocerinae
- Genus: Strombiola; Park, 2011
- Species: S. papuana

Binomial name
- Strombiola papuana Park, 2011

Genus of moths

Strombiola is a genus of moths in the family Lecithoceridae. It contains the species Strombiola papuana, which is found in New Guinea.
