= Pseudocrates soritica =

Scientific classification
- Kingdom: Animalia
- Phylum: Arthropoda
- Class: Insecta
- Order: Lepidoptera
- Family: Lecithoceridae
- Genus: Pseudocrates
- Species: P. soritica

Binomial name
- Pseudocrates soritica Meyrick, 1918

Species of moth

Pseudocrates soritica is a moth in the family Lecithoceridae. It was described by Edward Meyrick in 1918. It is found in southern India.

The wingspan is about 13 mm. The forewings are pale fuscous, sprinkled with dark fuscous, the margins irregularly irrorated (sprinkled) with blackish fuscous, especially along the costa. There is a blackish mark beneath the costa near the base and an oblique blackish mark from the dorsum at one-fourth, as well as an oblique transverse blackish-fuscous blotch representing the combined plical and first discal stigmata, a subtriangular spot representing the second discal. The hindwings are pale grey.
