= Atrichozancla phaeocrossis =

Scientific classification
- Kingdom: Animalia
- Phylum: Arthropoda
- Clade: Pancrustacea
- Class: Insecta
- Order: Lepidoptera
- Family: Lecithoceridae
- Genus: Atrichozancla
- Species: A. phaeocrossis

Binomial name
- Atrichozancla phaeocrossis (Meyrick, 1937)

Synonyms
- Eridachtha phaeocrossis Meyrick, 1937

Species of moth

Atrichozancla phaeocrossis is a moth in the family of Lecithoceridae. It was first described by Edward Meyrick in 1937. It is largely found in South Africa.
