= Pectinimura areola =

Scientific classification
- Domain: Eukaryota
- Kingdom: Animalia
- Phylum: Arthropoda
- Class: Insecta
- Order: Lepidoptera
- Family: Lecithoceridae
- Genus: Pectinimura
- Species: P. areola

Binomial name
- Pectinimura areola Park, 2011

Species of moth

Pectinimura areola is a moth in the family Lecithoceridae. It is found in Papua New Guinea.

The length of the forewings is 5.5–6 mm.

== Etymology ==
The species name is derived from Latin areola (meaning a small open space).
