= Kalocyrma =

Scientific classification
- Domain: Eukaryota
- Kingdom: Animalia
- Phylum: Arthropoda
- Class: Insecta
- Order: Lepidoptera
- Family: Lecithoceridae
- Subfamily: Lecithocerinae
- Genus: Kalocyrma; Wu, 1994

Genus of moths

Kalocyrma is a genus of moth in the family Lecithoceridae.

== Species ==
- Kalocyrma curota Wu, 1994
- Kalocyrma decurtata Wu, 1994
- Kalocyrma echita Wu, 1994
- Kalocyrma epileuca Wu & Park, 1999
- Kalocyrma oxygonia Wu & Park, 1999
