= Pectinimura brahmanica =

Scientific classification
- Domain: Eukaryota
- Kingdom: Animalia
- Phylum: Arthropoda
- Class: Insecta
- Order: Lepidoptera
- Family: Lecithoceridae
- Genus: Pectinimura
- Species: P. brahmanica

Binomial name
- Pectinimura brahmanica Park, 2011

Species of moth

Pectinimura brahmanica is a moth in the family Lecithoceridae. It is found in Papua New Guinea.

The length of the forewings is 5–5.5 mm.

== Etymology ==
The species name is derived from the Brahman Mission in Madang, the type locality.
