= Scolizona palinoides =

Scientific classification
- Kingdom: Animalia
- Phylum: Arthropoda
- Class: Insecta
- Order: Lepidoptera
- Family: Lecithoceridae
- Genus: Scolizona
- Species: S. palinoides

Binomial name
- Scolizona palinoides Park, 2011

Species of moth

Scolizona palinoides is a moth in the family Lecithoceridae. It is found in Papua New Guinea.

The wingspan is 18–20 mm (0.71–0.79 in).

== Etymology ==
The species name is derived from Greek palin (meaning backward) with the suffix -oides.
