= Hamatina =

Scientific classification
- Domain: Eukaryota
- Kingdom: Animalia
- Phylum: Arthropoda
- Class: Insecta
- Order: Lepidoptera
- Family: Lecithoceridae
- Subfamily: Lecithocerinae
- Genus: Hamatina; Park, 2011

Genus of moths

Hamatina is a genus of moths in the family Lecithoceridae.

== Species ==
- Hamatina hemitoma (Diakonoff, 1954)
- Hamatina diakonoffi Park, 2011
- Hamatina iriana Park, 2011
- Hamatina jembatana Park, 2011
- Hamatina nabangae Park, 2011
- Hamatina robdevosi Park, 2011
