= Siderostigma triatoma =

Scientific classification
- Kingdom: Animalia
- Phylum: Arthropoda
- Class: Insecta
- Order: Lepidoptera
- Family: Lecithoceridae
- Genus: Siderostigma
- Species: S. triatoma

Binomial name
- Siderostigma triatoma Gozmány, 1978

Species of wasp

Siderostigma triatoma is a parasitic wasp that belongs to the braconid family. Siderostigma triatoma is found in places with rich vegetation such as forests and tropical regions. Although the exact host is not documented, recent documentation has showed it targeting small insects.

== Description ==
The species is very small (a few millimetres long), very narrow between the thorax and abdomen. It has a dark color (brown to black), sometimes with light marks. The wings are transparent and have visible vein patterns. The antennae are long and thread-like.
