= Spatulignatha chrysopteryx =

Scientific classification
- Kingdom: Animalia
- Phylum: Arthropoda
- Clade: Pancrustacea
- Class: Insecta
- Order: Lepidoptera
- Family: Lecithoceridae
- Genus: Spatulignatha
- Species: S. chrysopteryx

Binomial name
- Spatulignatha chrysopteryx Wu, 1994

Species of moth

Spatulignatha chrysopteryx is a moth in the family Lecithoceridae. It is found in China.
