= Nosphistica erratica =

Scientific classification
- Kingdom: Animalia
- Phylum: Arthropoda
- Class: Insecta
- Order: Lepidoptera
- Family: Lecithoceridae
- Genus: Nosphistica
- Species: N. erratica

Binomial name
- Nosphistica erratica (Meyrick, 1911)

Synonyms
- Philoptila erratica Meyrick, 1911

Species of moth

Nosphistica erratica is a moth in the family Lecithoceridae. It was described by Edward Meyrick in 1911. It is known from Sri Lanka.

The wingspan is 15–17 mm. The forewings are dark purplish fuscous with a whitish-ochreous strigula on the costa near the base, and a transverse series of irregular marks at about one-fourth, as well as an irregular transverse spot from the dorsum about the middle, reaching nearly halfway across the wing, in males whitish, in females yellowish. There is an obscure darker spot in the disc at two-thirds, more or less edged laterally with whitish and there is a small white triangular spot on the costa towards the apex, and another at the tornus. The hindwings are dark fuscous with a white spot on the middle of the costa, and another before the apex, as well as two rather large blackish spots longitudinally placed in the middle of the disc, more or less whitish edged.
