= Spatulignatha longizonalis =

Scientific classification
- Domain: Eukaryota
- Kingdom: Animalia
- Phylum: Arthropoda
- Class: Insecta
- Order: Lepidoptera
- Family: Lecithoceridae
- Genus: Spatulignatha
- Species: S. longizonalis

Binomial name
- Spatulignatha longizonalis Liu & Wang, 2014

Species of moth

Spatulignatha longizonalis is a moth in the family Lecithoceridae. It is found in China (Guangxi).
