= Doxogenes thoracias =

Scientific classification
- Domain: Eukaryota
- Kingdom: Animalia
- Phylum: Arthropoda
- Class: Insecta
- Order: Lepidoptera
- Family: Lecithoceridae
- Genus: Doxogenes
- Species: D. thoracias

Binomial name
- Doxogenes thoracias (Meyrick, 1908)

Synonyms
- Tingentera thoracias Meyrick, 1908

Species of moth

Doxogenes thoracias is a moth in the family Lecithoceridae. It was described by Edward Meyrick in 1908. It is found in Sri Lanka.

The wingspan is 18–19 mm. The forewings are purplish fuscous, the posterior half suffused with pale metallic golden bronze and with an orange band occupying the basal third of the wing except a very small dark metallic bluish-leaden basal patch, the posterior edge strongly concave, produced along the costa as a slender streak almost to the apex. There is a light blue-leaden metallic spot in the middle of this band, and its posterior edge margined in the disc with a blue-leaden metallic streak. A small transverse-oval orange spot is found in the disc at three-fifths, sometimes connected with the dorsum by a patch of light yellowish suffusion almost confluent dorsally with the preceding band. The hindwings are whitish-ochreous, with a rather broad pale orange costal streak of modified scales and a submedian groove containing an expansible pencil of very long pale orange hairs.
