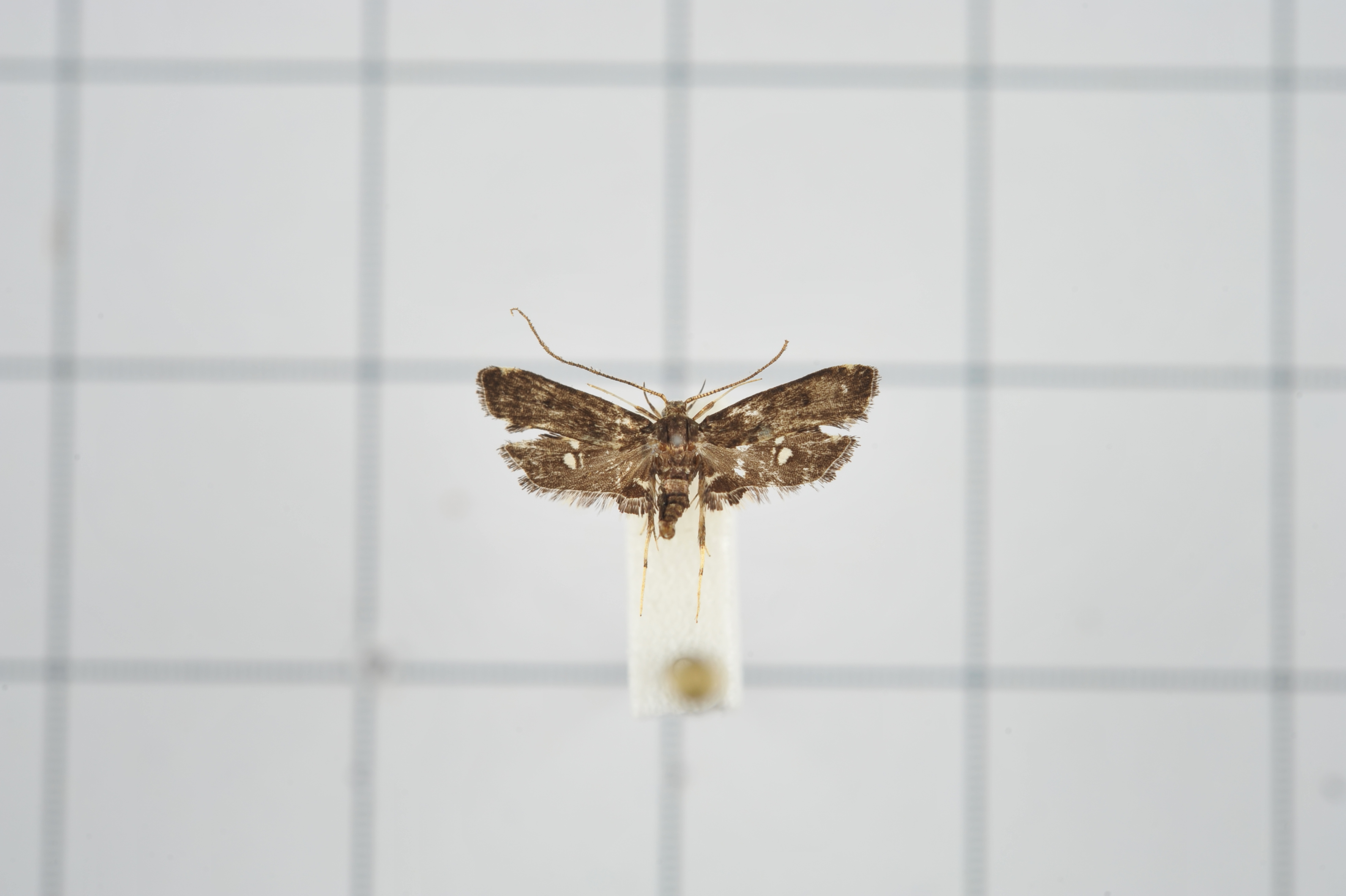

Scientific classification
- Kingdom: Animalia
- Phylum: Arthropoda
- Clade: Pancrustacea
- Class: Insecta
- Order: Lepidoptera
- Family: Lecithoceridae
- Genus: Nosphistica
- Species: N. fenestrata

Binomial name
- Nosphistica fenestrata (Gozmány, 1978)

Synonyms
- Philoptila fenestrata Gozmány, 1978

= Nosphistica fenestrata =

Species of moth

Nosphistica fenestrata is a moth in the family Lecithoceridae. It is found in Taiwan and southeastern China (Fujian).
