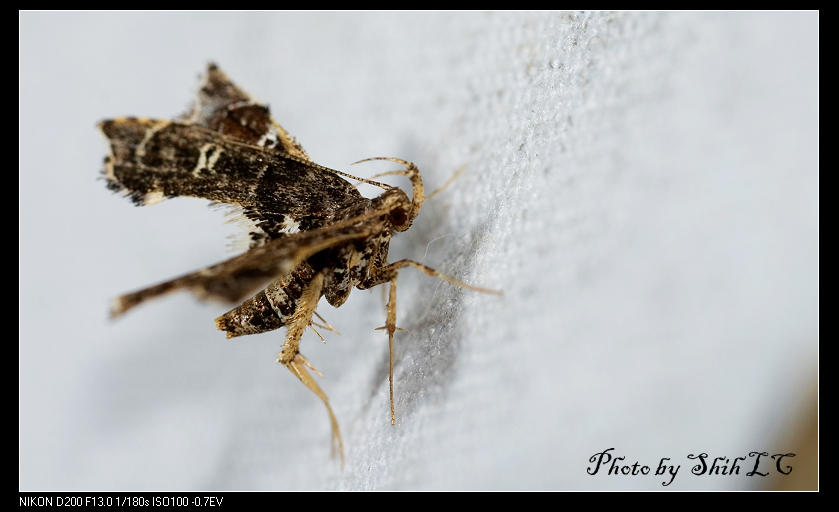
- Nosphistica bisinuata

Scientific classification
- Kingdom: Animalia
- Phylum: Arthropoda
- Clade: Pancrustacea
- Class: Insecta
- Order: Lepidoptera
- Family: Lecithoceridae
- Subfamily: Lecithocerinae
- Genus: Nosphistica; Meyrick, 1911

Type species
- Nosphistica erratica (Meyrick, 1911)

Synonyms
- Philoptila Meyrick, 1918

= Nosphistica =

Genus of moths

Nosphistica is a genus of moth in the family Lecithoceridae.

== Species ==
- Nosphistica acriella Park, 2002 (Thailand)
- Nosphistica bisinuata Park, 2002 (Taiwan)
- Nosphistica cornutata (Rose, Pathania & Sood, 2007)
- Nosphistica dolichina (Wu, 1996)
- Nosphistica effrenata (Meyrick, 1918) (India)
- Nosphistica erratica (Meyrick, 1911) (Sri Lanka)
- Nosphistica fenestrata (Gozmány, 1978) (China, Taiwan)
- Nosphistica fuscolepis Park, 2002 (Taiwan)
- Nosphistica metalychna (Meyrick, 1935) (China)
- Nosphistica minutispina (Wu, 1996)
- Nosphistica orientana Park, 2005
- Nosphistica owadai Park, 2005
- Nosphistica parameocola (Wu, 1996) (China)
- Nosphistica tarokoensis Park, 2002 (Taiwan)
- Nosphistica undulata Park, 2002 (Thailand)
