= Dinochares conotoma =

Scientific classification
- Kingdom: Animalia
- Phylum: Arthropoda
- Class: Insecta
- Order: Lepidoptera
- Family: Lecithoceridae
- Genus: Dinochares
- Species: D. conotoma

Binomial name
- Dinochares conotoma (Meyrick, 1908)

Synonyms
- Tingentera conotoma Meyrick, 1908

Species of moth

Dinochares conotoma is a moth in the family Lecithoceridae. It was described by Edward Meyrick in 1908. It is found in Sri Lanka.

The wingspan is 14–17 mm. The forewings are orange with a small dark purplish-leaden fuscous basal patch and two large oval bluish-leaden-metallic spots in the disc, the first towards the costa before the middle, the second towards the dorsum beyond the middle. There is a dark purplish-leaden-fuscous elongate semi-oval blotch extending along the dorsum from near the basal patch to the middle and a bronzy patch, anteriorly edged with dark fuscous suffusion, occupying the apical two-fifths of the wing except a narrow streak of ground colour along the costa almost to the apex, the anterior edge acutely indented in the middle. The hindwings are whitish ochreous in males, posteriorly suffused with light grey, with a submedian groove containing an expansible pencil of very long whitish-yellowish hairs. The hindwings of the females are grey.
