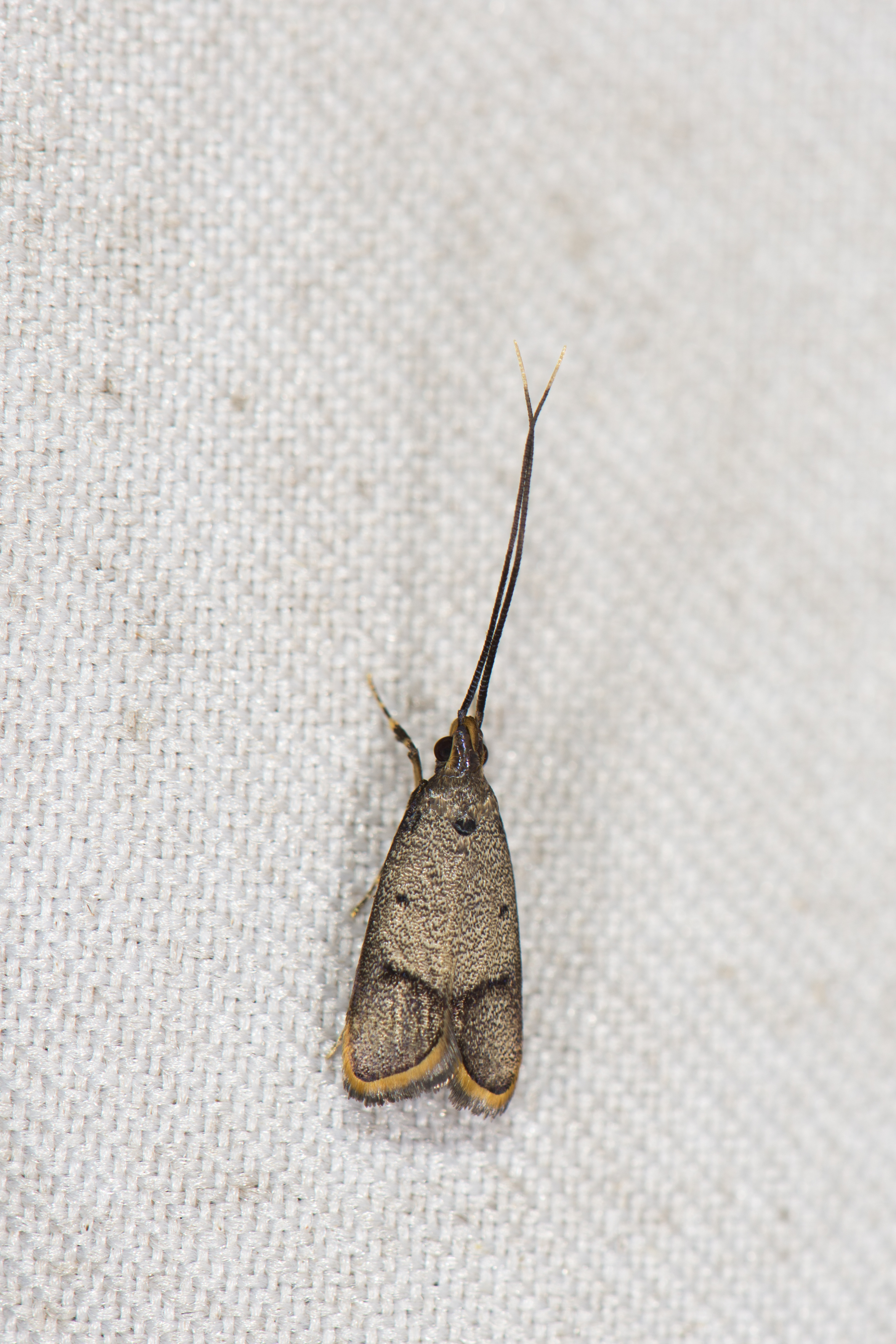

Scientific classification
- Kingdom: Animalia
- Phylum: Arthropoda
- Clade: Pancrustacea
- Class: Insecta
- Order: Lepidoptera
- Family: Lecithoceridae
- Genus: Spatulignatha
- Species: S. olaxana

Binomial name
- Spatulignatha olaxana C.S. Wu, 1994

= Spatulignatha olaxana =

Species of moth

Spatulignatha olaxana is a moth in the family Lecithoceridae. It is found in Taiwan and the provinces of Zhejiang, Jiangxi and Fujian in China.
