= Pectinimura =

Scientific classification
- Kingdom: Animalia
- Phylum: Arthropoda
- Class: Insecta
- Order: Lepidoptera
- Family: Lecithoceridae
- Subfamily: Lecithocerinae
- Genus: Pectinimura; Park, 2008

Genus of moths

Pectinimura is a genus of moths in the family Lecithoceridae.

== Species ==
- Pectinimura areola Park, 2011
- Pectinimura baryoma (Diakonoff, 1954)
- Pectinimura batubatuensis Park and Byun, 2008
- Pectinimura brahmanica Park, 2011
- Pectinimura crassipalpis Park and Byun, 2008
- Pectinimura crinalis Park and Byun, 2008
- Pectinimura gilvicostata Park, 2011
- Pectinimura liberalis (Diakonoff, 1954)
- Pectinimura lutescens (Diakonoff, 1954)
- Pectinimura montiatilis Park and Byun, 2008
- Pectinimura rhabdostoma (Diakonoff, 1954)
- Pectinimura singularis Park, 2011

== Etymology ==
The generic name is derived from Latin Pecten (meaning comb) and murus (meaning wall).
