= Trichoboscis =

Scientific classification
- Kingdom: Animalia
- Phylum: Arthropoda
- Class: Insecta
- Order: Lepidoptera
- Family: Lecithoceridae
- Subfamily: Lecithocerinae
- Genus: Trichoboscis; Meyrick, 1929

Genus of moths

Trichoboscis is a genus of moth in the family Lecithoceridae.

== Species ==
- Trichoboscis crocosema (Meyrick, 1929)
- Trichoboscis pansarista Meyrick, 1929
