= Amaloxestis callitricha =

Scientific classification
- Kingdom: Animalia
- Phylum: Arthropoda
- Class: Insecta
- Order: Lepidoptera
- Family: Lecithoceridae
- Genus: Amaloxestis
- Species: A. callitricha

Binomial name
- Amaloxestis callitricha (Meyrick, 1910)

Synonyms
- Homaloxestis callitricha Meyrick, 1910

Species of moth

Amaloxestis callitricha is a moth in the family Lecithoceridae. It was described by Edward Meyrick in 1910. It is found in Assam, India.

The wingspan is 20–21 mm. The forewings are light ochreous yellowish, more or less sprinkled finely with fuscous. The discal stigmata are blackish and well marked. The hindwings are whitish ochreous, slightly greyish tinged posteriorly, in males with a large and very long expansible pencil of light ochreous-yellowish hairs lying along the subdorsal fold from the base.
