= Doxogenes spectralis =

Scientific classification
- Domain: Eukaryota
- Kingdom: Animalia
- Phylum: Arthropoda
- Class: Insecta
- Order: Lepidoptera
- Family: Lecithoceridae
- Genus: Doxogenes
- Species: D. spectralis

Binomial name
- Doxogenes spectralis (Meyrick, 1905)

Synonyms
- Tipha spectralis Meyrick, 1905

Species of moth

Doxogenes spectralis is a moth in the family Lecithoceridae. It was described by Edward Meyrick in 1905. It is found in Sri Lanka.

The wingspan is about 21 mm. The forewings are light shining bronzy fuscous, the costa suffused with ochreous yellow, except a basal spot. The dorsum is suffused with ochreous yellow anteriorly, connected with the costal suffusion near the base, and by a bar at one-fifth. There is an indistinct ochreous-yellowish transverse mark below the middle of the disc. The hindwings are light grey, yellowish tinged, towards the costa suffused with yellow ochreous. There is a deep longitudinal median groove throughout, beneath which towards the base is a dense expansible pecten of long yellowish hairs.
