= Doxogenes phalaritis =

Scientific classification
- Domain: Eukaryota
- Kingdom: Animalia
- Phylum: Arthropoda
- Class: Insecta
- Order: Lepidoptera
- Family: Lecithoceridae
- Genus: Doxogenes
- Species: D. phalaritis

Binomial name
- Doxogenes phalaritis (Meyrick, 1905)

Synonyms
- Tipha phalaritis Meyrick, 1905

Species of moth

Doxogenes phalaritis is a moth in the family Lecithoceridae. It was described by Edward Meyrick in 1905. It is found in Sri Lanka.

The wingspan is about 18 mm. The forewings are deep reddish orange with purplish-fuscous markings. There is a very small basal patch and a discal dot at one-fifth, as well as a reniform blotch in the disc slightly before the middle and a terminal blotch occupying the posterior fourth of the wing. The hindwings are rather dark fuscous.
