= Mnesteria basanistis =

Scientific classification
- Kingdom: Animalia
- Phylum: Arthropoda
- Class: Insecta
- Order: Lepidoptera
- Family: Lecithoceridae
- Genus: Mnesteria
- Species: M. basanistis

Binomial name
- Mnesteria basanistis (Meyrick, 1908)

Synonyms
- Tingentera basanistis Meyrick, 1908

Species of moth

Mnesteria basanistis is a moth in the family Lecithoceridae. It was described by Edward Meyrick in 1908. It is found in Sri Lanka.

The wingspan is 14–17 mm. The forewings are orange, paler towards the costa with dark-metallic-leaden-grey markings and with a narrow basal spot, as well as a streak along the fold from near the base to near the middle. There is a streak in the disc from about one-third to two-thirds, as well as a small dorsal spot before the middle and the apical third of the wing is more or less broadly streaked with leaden grey between the veins, variable in extent. The hindwings are whitish ochreous in males, the costa suffused with grey, with a submedian groove and expansible pencil of long whitish-ochreous hairs from the base lying beneath it. The hindwings of the females are grey.
