= Pectinimura liberalis =

Scientific classification
- Domain: Eukaryota
- Kingdom: Animalia
- Phylum: Arthropoda
- Class: Insecta
- Order: Lepidoptera
- Family: Lecithoceridae
- Genus: Pectinimura
- Species: P. liberalis

Binomial name
- Pectinimura liberalis (Diakonoff, 1954)

Synonyms
- Lecithocera liberalis Diakonoff, 1954

Species of moth

Pectinimura liberalis is a moth in the family Lecithoceridae. It is found in Papua New Guinea.

The length of the forewings is 8–9 mm.
