= Telephata =

Scientific classification
- Kingdom: Animalia
- Phylum: Arthropoda
- Class: Insecta
- Order: Lepidoptera
- Family: Lecithoceridae
- Subfamily: Lecithocerinae
- Genus: Telephata; Meyrick, 1916

Genus of moths

Telephata is a genus of moth in the family Lecithoceridae.

== Species ==
- Telephata cheramopis Meyrick, 1916
- Telephata ferruginula Park, 2011
- Telephata melanista Park, 2011
- Telephata nitens (Diakonoff, 1954)
