= Pseudocrates =

Scientific classification
- Kingdom: Animalia
- Phylum: Arthropoda
- Class: Insecta
- Order: Lepidoptera
- Family: Lecithoceridae
- Subfamily: Lecithocerinae
- Genus: Pseudocrates; Meyrick, 1918

Genus of moths

Pseudocrates is a genus of moth in the family Lecithoceridae.

== Species ==
- Pseudocrates antisphena Meyrick, 1918
- Pseudocrates soritica Meyrick, 1918
