= Pectinimura baryoma =

Scientific classification
- Domain: Eukaryota
- Kingdom: Animalia
- Phylum: Arthropoda
- Class: Insecta
- Order: Lepidoptera
- Family: Lecithoceridae
- Genus: Pectinimura
- Species: P. baryoma

Binomial name
- Pectinimura baryoma (Diakonoff, 1954)

Synonyms
- Lecithocera baryoma Diakonoff, 1954

Species of moth

Pectinimura baryoma is a moth in the family Lecithoceridae. It is found in Papua New Guinea.

The length of the forewing is about 7 mm.
