= Sulciolus =

Scientific classification
- Domain: Eukaryota
- Kingdom: Animalia
- Phylum: Arthropoda
- Class: Insecta
- Order: Lepidoptera
- Family: Lecithoceridae
- Subfamily: Lecithocerinae
- Genus: Sulciolus; Park, 2012

Genus of moths

Sulciolus is a genus of moths in the family Lecithoceridae.

== Species ==
- Sulciolus abrasa (Diakonoff, 1954)
- Sulciolus capra (Diakonoff, 1954)
- Sulciolus circulivalvae Park, 2012
- Sulciolus induta (Diakonoff, 1954)
- Sulciolus kaindiana Park, 2012
- Sulciolus pachystoma (Diakonoff, 1954)
- Sulciolus perspicua (Diakonoff, 1954)
