= Synersaga phuruaensis =

Scientific classification
- Kingdom: Animalia
- Phylum: Arthropoda
- Class: Insecta
- Order: Lepidoptera
- Family: Lecithoceridae
- Genus: Synersaga
- Species: S. phuruaensis

Binomial name
- Synersaga phuruaensis Park, 2009

Species of moth

Synersaga phuruaensis is a moth in the family Lecithoceridae. It is found in Thailand.

The wingspan is 16-16.5 mm.
