= Parelliptis librata =

Scientific classification
- Kingdom: Animalia
- Phylum: Arthropoda
- Class: Insecta
- Order: Lepidoptera
- Family: Lecithoceridae
- Genus: Parelliptis
- Species: P. librata

Binomial name
- Parelliptis librata Meyrick, 1910

Species of moth

Parelliptis librata is a moth in the family Lecithoceridae. It was described by Edward Meyrick in 1910. It is found on Java in Indonesia.

The wingspan is about 24 mm. The forewings are whitish ochreous, suffusedly and irregularly irrorated (sprinkled) with fuscous. The discal stigmata are round and black and there is an undefined streak of dark fuscous irroration running from the second discal stigma to the apex. The hindwings are whitish fuscous, rather darker towards the apex.
