= Pseudocrates antisphena =

Scientific classification
- Kingdom: Animalia
- Phylum: Arthropoda
- Class: Insecta
- Order: Lepidoptera
- Family: Lecithoceridae
- Genus: Pseudocrates
- Species: P. antisphena

Binomial name
- Pseudocrates antisphena Meyrick, 1918

Species of moth

Pseudocrates antisphena is a moth in the family Lecithoceridae. It was described by Edward Meyrick in 1918. It is found in southern India.

The wingspan is about 13 mm. The forewings are light brownish, sprinkled with blackish fuscous except in the disc, especially along the costa, forming small groups of scales on the margins towards the apex. The stigmata are large and blackish, the plical beyond the first discal and more or less completely united with it to form an oblique subtriangular blotch, edged with whitish posteriorly, the second discal triangular, edged laterally whitish. The hindwings are grey whitish, becoming pale grey posteriorly.
