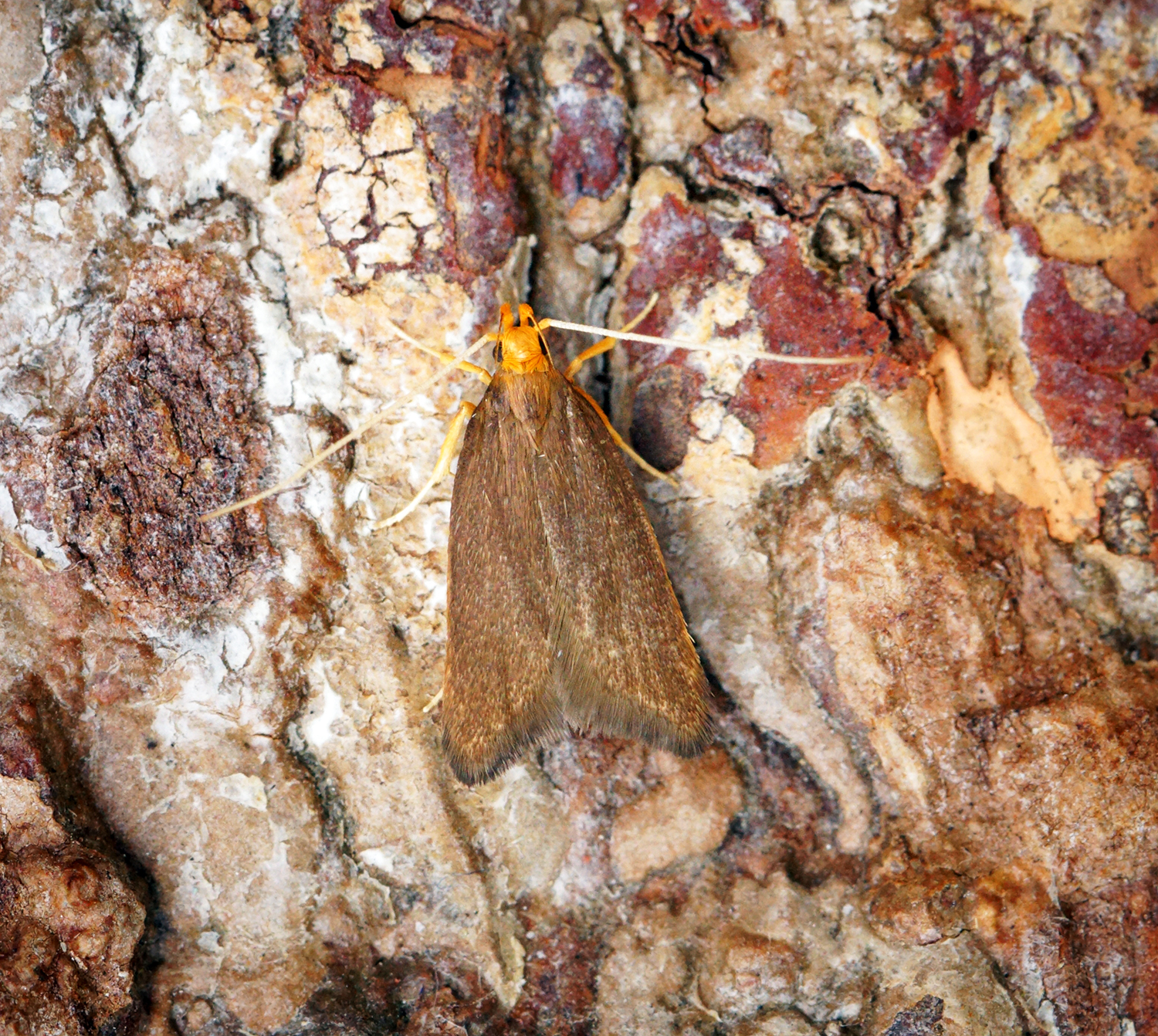
- Moth in Las Descargues, Terrou, France

Scientific classification
- Domain: Eukaryota
- Kingdom: Animalia
- Phylum: Arthropoda
- Class: Insecta
- Order: Lepidoptera
- Family: Lecithoceridae
- Genus: Eurodachtha
- Species: E. pallicornella

Binomial name
- Eurodachtha pallicornella (Staudinger, 1859)

Synonyms
- Lecithocera pallicornella Staudinger, 1859

= Eurodachtha pallicornella =

Species of moth

Eurodachtha pallicornella is a moth in the family Lecithoceridae. It was described by Otto Staudinger in 1859. It is found in France and on the Iberian Peninsula.

The wingspan is about 15 mm. The forewings are glossy dark brown in males and light brownish-yellow in females.
