= Pectinimura crinalis =

Scientific classification
- Kingdom: Animalia
- Phylum: Arthropoda
- Class: Insecta
- Order: Lepidoptera
- Family: Lecithoceridae
- Genus: Pectinimura
- Species: P. crinalis

Binomial name
- Pectinimura crinalis Park and Byun, 2008

Species of moth

Pectinimura crinalis is a moth in the family Lecithoceridae. It is found on Palawan province of the Philippines.

The wingspan is 14.5-15.5 mm.
