= Procharista spectabilosa =

Scientific classification
- Kingdom: Animalia
- Phylum: Arthropoda
- Clade: Pancrustacea
- Class: Insecta
- Order: Lepidoptera
- Family: Lecithoceridae
- Genus: Procharista
- Species: P. spectabilosa

Binomial name
- Procharista spectabilosa Park, 2009

Species of moth

Procharista spectabilosa is a moth in the family Lecithoceridae. It was described by Kyu-Tek Park in 2009. It is found in Thailand.

The wingspan is 12.5–13 mm. The forewings are yellowish brown. The hindwings are uniform clothed.
