= Thailepidonia =

Scientific classification
- Kingdom: Animalia
- Phylum: Arthropoda
- Class: Insecta
- Order: Lepidoptera
- Family: Lecithoceridae
- Subfamily: Lecithocerinae
- Genus: Thailepidonia; Park, 2007
- Species: T. yoshiyasui

Binomial name
- Thailepidonia yoshiyasui Park, 2007

Genus of moths

Thailepidonia is a genus of moths in the family Lecithoceridae. It contains the species Thailepidonia yoshiyasui, which is found in Thailand.
