= Atrichozancla =

Scientific classification
- Domain: Eukaryota
- Kingdom: Animalia
- Phylum: Arthropoda
- Class: Insecta
- Order: Lepidoptera
- Family: Lecithoceridae
- Subfamily: Lecithocerinae
- Genus: Atrichozancla; Janse, 1954

Genus of moths

Atrichozancla is a genus of moths in the lecithocerid subfamily Lecithocerinae. It was established by Anthonie Johannes Theodorus Janse in 1954.

== Species ==
- Atrichozancla cosymbota (Meyrick, 1920)
- Atrichozancla gymnopalpa Janse, 1963
- Atrichozancla phaeocrossis (Meyrick, 1937)
