= Hoenea =

Scientific classification
- Kingdom: Animalia
- Phylum: Arthropoda
- Clade: Pancrustacea
- Class: Insecta
- Order: Lepidoptera
- Family: Lecithoceridae
- Subfamily: Lecithocerinae
- Genus: Hoenea; Gozmány, 1970
- Species: H. helenae

Binomial name
- Hoenea helenae Gozmány, 1970

Genus of moths

Hoenea is a genus of moth in the family Lecithoceridae. It contains the species Hoenea helenae, which is found in China.
