= Technographa =

Scientific classification
- Kingdom: Animalia
- Phylum: Arthropoda
- Class: Insecta
- Order: Lepidoptera
- Family: Lecithoceridae
- Subfamily: Lecithocerinae
- Genus: Technographa; Meyrick, 1925
- Species: T. ephestris

Binomial name
- Technographa ephestris (Meyrick, 1908)

Synonyms
- Tingentera ephestris Meyrick, 1908

Genus of moths

Technographa is a genus of moth in the family Lecithoceridae. It contains the species Technographa ephestris, which is found in Sri Lanka.

The wingspan is 16–18 mm. The forewings are orange with a blackish dot on the base of the costa. There is a fascia near the base composed of two irregular dark fuscous lines mixed with leaden-metallic coincident at the extremities. There is a similar irregular transverse line at one-fourth, closely followed by a moderate dark fuscous fascia, narrowed on the costa and dilated on the dorsum. There is a round dark fuscous dot mixed with leaden-metallic in the middle of the disc and a moderate inwards-curved fascia of fuscous suffusion from about three-fourths of the costa to the tornus, marked with a strongly inwards-oblique leaden-metallic streak from the costa, a dot below the middle, and a longitudinal mark on the tornus. There are also three similar longitudinal leaden-metallic marks on the termen, and one on the costa before the apex, more or less surrounded with fuscous suffusion. The hindwings are rather dark grey with a small whitish-ochreous patch at the tornus, above which is a hyaline groove containing a pencil of whitish-ochreous hairs.
