= Doxogenes henicosura =

Scientific classification
- Kingdom: Animalia
- Phylum: Arthropoda
- Clade: Pancrustacea
- Class: Insecta
- Order: Lepidoptera
- Family: Lecithoceridae
- Genus: Doxogenes
- Species: D. henicosura

Binomial name
- Doxogenes henicosura Wu & Park, 1999

Species of moth

Doxogenes henicosura is a moth in the family Lecithoceridae. It was described by Chun-Sheng Wu and Kyu-Tek Park in 1999. It is found in Sri Lanka.
