= Nosphistica orientana =

Scientific classification
- Kingdom: Animalia
- Phylum: Arthropoda
- Clade: Pancrustacea
- Class: Insecta
- Order: Lepidoptera
- Family: Lecithoceridae
- Genus: Nosphistica
- Species: N. orientana

Binomial name
- Nosphistica orientana Park, 2005

Species of moth

Nosphistica orientana is a moth in the family Lecithoceridae. It was described by Kyu-Tek Park in 2005. It is found in Guangdong, China.
