= Kalocyrma oxygonia =

Scientific classification
- Kingdom: Animalia
- Phylum: Arthropoda
- Clade: Pancrustacea
- Class: Insecta
- Order: Lepidoptera
- Family: Lecithoceridae
- Genus: Kalocyrma
- Species: K. oxygonia

Binomial name
- Kalocyrma oxygonia Wu & Park, 1999

Species of moth

Kalocyrma oxygonia is a moth in the family Lecithoceridae. It was described by Chun-Sheng Wu and Kyu-Tek Park in 1999. It is found in Sri Lanka.

== Physical Description ==
The wingspan is about 9mm, and it has orange antennae. It is worth noting that the base and apex are brown, and the full length is not a solid colour. The labial palpi are dark brown, and its head and thorax are a yellowish white.

== Etymology ==
The species name is derived from Greek oxys (meaning sharp).
