= Telephata melanista =

Scientific classification
- Kingdom: Animalia
- Phylum: Arthropoda
- Clade: Pancrustacea
- Class: Insecta
- Order: Lepidoptera
- Family: Lecithoceridae
- Genus: Telephata
- Species: T. melanista

Binomial name
- Telephata melanista Park, 2011

Species of moth

Telephata melanista is a moth in the family Lecithoceridae. It was described by Kyu-Tek Park in 2011. It is found in Papua New Guinea.
