= Neopectinimura walmakensis =

Scientific classification
- Domain: Eukaryota
- Kingdom: Animalia
- Phylum: Arthropoda
- Class: Insecta
- Order: Lepidoptera
- Family: Lecithoceridae
- Genus: Neopectinimura
- Species: N. walmakensis

Binomial name
- Neopectinimura walmakensis Park, 2014

Species of moth

Neopectinimura walmakensis is a moth in the family Lecithoceridae. It is found in Papua New Guinea.
