= Amaloxestis perizeucta =

Scientific classification
- Kingdom: Animalia
- Phylum: Arthropoda
- Class: Insecta
- Order: Lepidoptera
- Family: Lecithoceridae
- Genus: Amaloxestis
- Species: A. perizeucta

Binomial name
- Amaloxestis perizeucta (Meyrick, 1910)

Synonyms
- Homaloxestis perizeucta Meyrick, 1910

Species of moth

Amaloxestis perizeucta is a moth in the family Lecithoceridae. It was described by Edward Meyrick in 1910. It is found in Assam, India.

The wingspan is 20–21 mm. The forewings are pale ochreous more or less sprinkled with fuscous. The discal stigmata are indistinct and fuscous. The hindwings are light grey, tinged with whitish ochreous.
