= Hamatina nabangae =

Scientific classification
- Kingdom: Animalia
- Phylum: Arthropoda
- Clade: Pancrustacea
- Class: Insecta
- Order: Lepidoptera
- Family: Lecithoceridae
- Genus: Hamatina
- Species: H. nabangae

Binomial name
- Hamatina nabangae Park, 2011

Species of moth

Hamatina nabangae is a moth in the family Lecithoceridae. It was described by Kyu-Tek Park in 2011. It is found in Papua New Guinea.
