= Dragmatucha bivia =

Scientific classification
- Domain: Eukaryota
- Kingdom: Animalia
- Phylum: Arthropoda
- Class: Insecta
- Order: Lepidoptera
- Family: Lecithoceridae
- Genus: Dragmatucha
- Species: D. bivia

Binomial name
- Dragmatucha bivia Meyrick, 1918

Species of moth

Dragmatucha bivia is a moth in the family Lecithoceridae. It was described by Edward Meyrick in 1918. It is found in South Africa.

The wingspan is about 22 mm. The forewings are dark purplish fuscous with a nearly straight whitish-ochreous transverse streak at one-fourth and a nearly straight whitish-ochreous line from the costa near the apex to the dorsum before the tornus. The hindwings are grey, darker towards the apex and with a small ochreous-white spot on the costa near the apex, where a cloudy whitish line runs near the termen to below its middle.
