= Onnuria =

Scientific classification
- Kingdom: Animalia
- Phylum: Arthropoda
- Class: Insecta
- Order: Lepidoptera
- Family: Lecithoceridae
- Subfamily: Lecithocerinae
- Genus: Onnuria; Park, 2011

Genus of moths

Onnuria is a genus of moths in the family Lecithoceridae.

== Species ==
- Onnuria arfakana Park, 2011
- Onnuria depaprensis Park, 2011
- Onnuria melanotoma Park, 2011
- Onnuria tenuiella Park, 2011
- Onnuria xanthochroa Park, 2011
