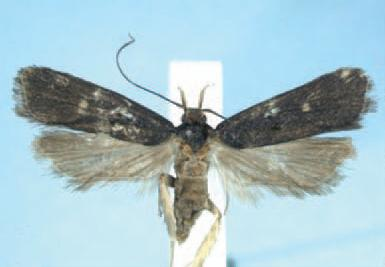

Scientific classification
- Domain: Eukaryota
- Kingdom: Animalia
- Phylum: Arthropoda
- Class: Insecta
- Order: Lepidoptera
- Family: Lecithoceridae
- Genus: Synersaga
- Species: S. mondulkiriensis

Binomial name
- Synersaga mondulkiriensis Park & Bae, 2012

= Synersaga mondulkiriensis =

Species of moth

Synersaga mondulkiriensis is a moth in the family Lecithoceridae. It is found in Cambodia.

The wingspan is 17–18 mm.
