= Teucrodoxa monetella =

Scientific classification
- Domain: Eukaryota
- Kingdom: Animalia
- Phylum: Arthropoda
- Class: Insecta
- Order: Lepidoptera
- Family: Lecithoceridae
- Genus: Teucrodoxa
- Species: T. monetella

Binomial name
- Teucrodoxa monetella (C. Felder, R. Felder & Rogenhofer, 1875)

Synonyms
- Anarsia monetella Felder & Rogenhofer, 1875

Species of moth

Teucrodoxa monetella is a moth in the family Lecithoceridae. It was described by Cajetan Felder, Rudolf Felder and Alois Friedrich Rogenhofer in 1875. It is found in Sri Lanka.
