= Nosphistica effrenata =

Scientific classification
- Kingdom: Animalia
- Phylum: Arthropoda
- Class: Insecta
- Order: Lepidoptera
- Family: Lecithoceridae
- Genus: Nosphistica
- Species: N. effrenata

Binomial name
- Nosphistica effrenata (Meyrick, 1918)

Synonyms
- Philoptila effrenata Meyrick, 1918

Species of moth

Nosphistica effrenata is a moth in the family Lecithoceridae. It was described by Edward Meyrick in 1918. It is known from southern India.

The wingspan is about 16 mm. The forewings are dark purplish fuscous with a small cloudy-white spot above the dorsum beyond the middle and a small rather oblique wedge-shaped white mark on the costa beyond four-fifths. The hindwings are blackish with small white marks on the costa at the middle and five-sixths.
