= Nosphistica tarokoensis =

Scientific classification
- Kingdom: Animalia
- Phylum: Arthropoda
- Class: Insecta
- Order: Lepidoptera
- Family: Lecithoceridae
- Genus: Nosphistica
- Species: N. tarokoensis

Binomial name
- Nosphistica tarokoensis Park, 2002

Species of moth

Nosphistica tarokoensis is a moth in the family Lecithoceridae which is endemic to Taiwan.
