= Atrichozancla gymnopalpa =

Scientific classification
- Domain: Eukaryota
- Kingdom: Animalia
- Phylum: Arthropoda
- Class: Insecta
- Order: Lepidoptera
- Family: Lecithoceridae
- Genus: Atrichozancla
- Species: A. gymnopalpa

Binomial name
- Atrichozancla gymnopalpa Janse, 1963

Species of moth

Atrichozancla gymnopalpa is a moth in the family Lecithoceridae. It was described by Anthonie Johannes Theodorus Janse in 1963. It is found in Zimbabwe.
