= Atrichozancla cosymbota =

Scientific classification
- Kingdom: Animalia
- Phylum: Arthropoda
- Class: Insecta
- Order: Lepidoptera
- Family: Lecithoceridae
- Genus: Atrichozancla
- Species: A. cosymbota

Binomial name
- Atrichozancla cosymbota (Meyrick, 1920)

Synonyms
- Eridachtha cosymbota Meyrick, 1920

Species of moth

Atrichozancla cosymbota is a moth in the family Lecithoceridae. It was described by Edward Meyrick in 1920. It is found in South Africa.

The wingspan is about 15 millimetres (0.59 in). The forewings are dark violet grey, suffusedly irrorated (sprinkled) with dark fuscous and with an obscure cloudy darker spot representing the second discal stigma, edged anteriorly by a small roundish ochreous-whitish spot. The hindwings are grey, darker towards the apex.
