= Dinochares =

Scientific classification
- Domain: Eukaryota
- Kingdom: Animalia
- Phylum: Arthropoda
- Class: Insecta
- Order: Lepidoptera
- Family: Lecithoceridae
- Subfamily: Lecithocerinae
- Genus: Dinochares; Meyrick, 1925

Genus of moths

Dinochares is a genus of moths in the family Lecithoceridae.

== Species ==
- Dinochares conotoma (Meyrick, 1908)
- Dinochares notolepis Park, 1999
