= Teucrodoxa spiculifera =

Scientific classification
- Kingdom: Animalia
- Phylum: Arthropoda
- Class: Insecta
- Order: Lepidoptera
- Family: Lecithoceridae
- Genus: Teucrodoxa
- Species: T. spiculifera

Binomial name
- Teucrodoxa spiculifera (Meyrick, 1918)

Synonyms
- Mnestria spiculifera Meyrick, 1918

Species of moth

Teucrodoxa spiculifera is a moth in the family Lecithoceridae. It was described by Edward Meyrick in 1918. It is found in Sri Lanka.

The wingspan is 20–22 mm. The forewings are ochreous yellow in males and ochreous orange in females. The markings shining leaden grey metallic, edged with some black scales. There is an elongate spot on the base of the costa and elongate marks in the disc at one-fifth and beyond the middle. There is a somewhat oblique transverse line at two-fifths. On the posterior two-fifths, a series of more or less developed longitudinal lines is found between the veins. The hindwings of the males are blackish grey, suffused with whitish ochreous on the anterior three-fifths except towards the margins. The hindwings of the females are grey.
