= Lecitholaxa thiodora =

Scientific classification
- Kingdom: Animalia
- Phylum: Arthropoda
- Class: Insecta
- Order: Lepidoptera
- Family: Lecithoceridae
- Genus: Lecitholaxa
- Species: L. thiodora

Binomial name
- Lecitholaxa thiodora (Meyrick, 1914)

Synonyms
- Lecithocera thiodora Meyrick, 1914; Lecithocera leucocerus Meyrick, 1932

Species of moth

Lecitholaxa thiodora is a species of moth of the family Lecithoceridae. It is found in Taiwan, China (from south to north), Japan, Korea and India.

The wingspan is 13–14 mm.
