= Neotimyra =

Scientific classification
- Domain: Eukaryota
- Kingdom: Animalia
- Phylum: Arthropoda
- Class: Insecta
- Order: Lepidoptera
- Family: Lecithoceridae
- Subfamily: Lecithocerinae
- Genus: Neotimyra; Park, 2011

Genus of moths

Neotimyra is a genus of moths in the family Lecithoceridae.

== Species ==
- Neotimyra gyriola Park, 2011
- Neotimyra milleri Park, 2011
- Neotimyra nemoralis Park, 2011
- Neotimyra senara Park, 2011
- Neotimyra warkapiensis Park, 2011
