= Neocorodes =

Scientific classification
- Kingdom: Animalia
- Phylum: Arthropoda
- Class: Insecta
- Order: Lepidoptera
- Family: Lecithoceridae
- Subfamily: Lecithocerinae
- Genus: Neocorodes; Meyrick, 1923
- Species: N. amnesta

Binomial name
- Neocorodes amnesta Meyrick, 1923

Genus of moths

Neocorodes is a genus of moth in the family Lecithoceridae. It contains the species Neocorodes amnesta which is found on Cyprus.

The wingspan is about 10 mm. The forewings are light fuscous irrorated dark fuscous. The discal stigmata forming small cloudy dark fuscous spots. The hindwings are grey.
