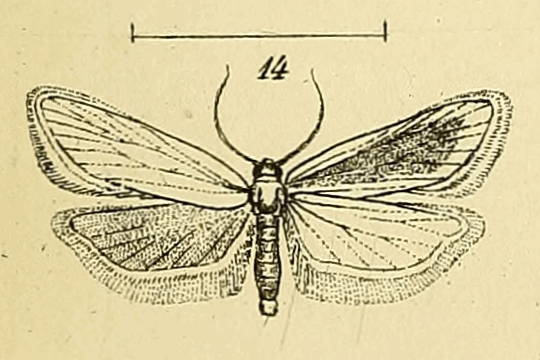

Scientific classification
- Domain: Eukaryota
- Kingdom: Animalia
- Phylum: Arthropoda
- Class: Insecta
- Order: Lepidoptera
- Family: Lecithoceridae
- Genus: Eurodachtha
- Species: E. flavissimella

Binomial name
- Eurodachtha flavissimella (J. J. Mann, 1862)

Synonyms
- Lecithocera flavissimella J. J. Mann, 1862; Phibalocera flavissimella var. intermedia Staudinger, 1871

= Eurodachtha flavissimella =

Species of moth

Eurodachtha flavissimella is a moth in the family Lecithoceridae. It was described by Josef Johann Mann in 1862. It is found in Bulgaria, Greece and Spain. It is also found in Turkey.

The wingspan is about 15 mm. The forewings are ochreous almost golden yellow. The hindwings tending to greyish.
