= Dragmatucha proaula =

Scientific classification
- Kingdom: Animalia
- Phylum: Arthropoda
- Class: Insecta
- Order: Lepidoptera
- Family: Lecithoceridae
- Genus: Dragmatucha
- Species: D. proaula

Binomial name
- Dragmatucha proaula Meyrick, 1908

Species of moth

Dragmatucha proaula is a moth in the family Lecithoceridae. It was described by Edward Meyrick in 1908. It is found in Botswana, Mozambique, Namibia, South Africa (Limpopo) and Zimbabwe.

The wingspan is about 30 mm. The forewings are dark purplish fuscous with a small irregular pale ochreous-yellow spot at the base and two irregular whitish-ochreous transverse fasciae, dilated towards the costa and becoming deep ochreous yellow on the costal edge, at about two-fifths and four-fifths. The hindwings are rather dark grey.
