= Amaloxestis =

Scientific classification
- Kingdom: Animalia
- Phylum: Arthropoda
- Clade: Pancrustacea
- Class: Insecta
- Order: Lepidoptera
- Family: Lecithoceridae
- Subfamily: Lecithocerinae
- Genus: Amaloxestis; Gozmány, 1971

Genus of moths

Amaloxestis is a genus of moths in the lecithocerid subfamily Lecithocerinae. It was established by László Anthony Gozmány in 1971.

== Species ==
- Amaloxestis astringens Gozmány, 1973
- Amaloxestis callitricha (Meyrick, 1910)
- Amaloxestis chiloptila (Meyrick, 1921)
- Amaloxestis nepalensis Gozmány, 1973
- Amaloxestis perizeucta (Meyrick, 1910)
