= Nosphistica dolichina =

Scientific classification
- Kingdom: Animalia
- Phylum: Arthropoda
- Clade: Pancrustacea
- Class: Insecta
- Order: Lepidoptera
- Family: Lecithoceridae
- Genus: Nosphistica
- Species: N. dolichina

Binomial name
- Nosphistica dolichina (Wu, 1996)

Synonyms
- Philoptila dolichina Wu, 1996

Species of moth

Nosphistica dolichina is a moth in the family Lecithoceridae. It was described by Chun-Sheng Wu in 1996. It is found in Yunnan, China.
