= Lecitholaxa zopheropis =

Scientific classification
- Kingdom: Animalia
- Phylum: Arthropoda
- Class: Insecta
- Order: Lepidoptera
- Family: Lecithoceridae
- Genus: Lecitholaxa
- Species: L. zopheropis

Binomial name
- Lecitholaxa zopheropis (Meyrick, 1931)

Synonyms
- Lecithocera zopheropis Meyrick, 1931

Species of moth

Lecitholaxa zopheropis is a moth in the family Lecithoceridae. It was described by Edward Meyrick in 1931. It is found in Sikkim, India.

The wingspan is about 16 mm.
