= Eurodachtha canigella =

Scientific classification
- Domain: Eukaryota
- Kingdom: Animalia
- Phylum: Arthropoda
- Class: Insecta
- Order: Lepidoptera
- Family: Lecithoceridae
- Genus: Eurodachtha
- Species: E. canigella

Binomial name
- Eurodachtha canigella (Caradja, 1920)

Synonyms
- Lecithocera canigella Caradja, 1920; Sarisophora occidentella Amsel, 1953

Species of moth

Eurodachtha canigella is a moth in the family Lecithoceridae. It was described by Aristide Caradja in 1920. It is found in Germany, France, Italy and on the Iberian Peninsula.

The forewings are deep black and the hindwings are grey.
