= Doxogenes philodoxa =

Scientific classification
- Domain: Eukaryota
- Kingdom: Animalia
- Phylum: Arthropoda
- Class: Insecta
- Order: Lepidoptera
- Family: Lecithoceridae
- Genus: Doxogenes
- Species: D. philodoxa

Binomial name
- Doxogenes philodoxa (Meyrick, 1908)

Synonyms
- Tingentera philodoxa Meyrick, 1908

Species of moth

Doxogenes philodoxa is a moth in the family Lecithoceridae. It was described by Edward Meyrick in 1908. It is found in Sri Lanka.

The wingspan is about 20 mm. The forewings are orange, posteriorly mixed with dark purplish-fuscous suffusion and with a narrow dark blue-leaden-metallic streak from the base of the costa to the disc at one-third, then bent downwards and irregularly thickened to the dorsum before the tornus. There is a dark purplish-fuscous streak along the dorsum from near the base, containing a leaden-metallic streak, running into this posteriorly and there is also a triangular suffused dark purplish-fuscous patch in the disc beyond two-thirds, confluent beneath with these streaks. The termen is suffused with deep bronzy purple. The hindwings are blackish fuscous.
