= Onnuria arfakana =

Scientific classification
- Kingdom: Animalia
- Phylum: Arthropoda
- Clade: Pancrustacea
- Class: Insecta
- Order: Lepidoptera
- Family: Lecithoceridae
- Genus: Onnuria
- Species: O. arfakana

Binomial name
- Onnuria arfakana Park, 2011

Species of moth

Onnuria arfakana is a moth in the family Lecithoceridae. It was described by Kyu-Tek Park in 2011. It is found in Papua New Guinea.
