= Sulciolus abrasa =

Scientific classification
- Kingdom: Animalia
- Phylum: Arthropoda
- Class: Insecta
- Order: Lepidoptera
- Family: Lecithoceridae
- Genus: Sulciolus
- Species: S. abrasa

Binomial name
- Sulciolus abrasa (Diakonoff, 1954)

Synonyms
- Lecithocera abrasa Diakonoff, 1954

Species of moth

Sulciolus abrasa is a moth in the family Lecithoceridae. It was described by Alexey Diakonoff in 1954. It is found in New Guinea.
