= Mnesteria =

Scientific classification
- Kingdom: Animalia
- Phylum: Arthropoda
- Class: Insecta
- Order: Lepidoptera
- Family: Lecithoceridae
- Subfamily: Lecithocerinae
- Genus: Mnesteria; Meyrick, 1910

Genus of moths

Mnesteria is a genus of moth in the family Lecithoceridae.

== Species ==
- Mnesteria basanistis (Meyrick, 1908)
- Mnesteria pharetrata (Meyrick, 1905)
- Mnesteria sideraula Meyrick, 1916
