= Parelliptis sporochlora =

Scientific classification
- Kingdom: Animalia
- Phylum: Arthropoda
- Class: Insecta
- Order: Lepidoptera
- Family: Lecithoceridae
- Genus: Parelliptis
- Species: P. sporochlora

Binomial name
- Parelliptis sporochlora (Meyrick, 1929)

Synonyms
- Lecithocera sporochlora Meyrick, 1929

Species of moth

Parelliptis sporochlora is a moth in the family Lecithoceridae. It was described by Edward Meyrick in 1929. It is found in Sri Lanka.

The wingspan is about 17 mm.
