= Procharista sardonias =

Scientific classification
- Kingdom: Animalia
- Phylum: Arthropoda
- Class: Insecta
- Order: Lepidoptera
- Family: Lecithoceridae
- Genus: Procharista
- Species: P. sardonias

Binomial name
- Procharista sardonias Meyrick, 1922

Species of moth

Procharista sardonias is a moth in the family Lecithoceridae. It was described by Edward Meyrick in 1922. It is found on Java in Indonesia.

The wingspan is about 18 mm. The forewings are fuscous, all veins marked by cloudy whitish lines and with a dark blue line just below the costa on the basal fifth. The hindwings towards the base and in the disc thinly clothed with grey hairscales, elsewhere flat-scaled, light grey.
