= Dinochares notolepis =

Scientific classification
- Kingdom: Animalia
- Phylum: Arthropoda
- Class: Insecta
- Order: Lepidoptera
- Family: Lecithoceridae
- Genus: Dinochares
- Species: D. notolepis

Binomial name
- Dinochares notolepis Park, 1999

Species of moth

Dinochares notolepis is a moth in the family Lecithoceridae first described by Kyu-Tek Park in 1999. It is found in Taiwan.

The wingspan is 12–18 mm.
