= Trichoboscis pansarista =

Scientific classification
- Kingdom: Animalia
- Phylum: Arthropoda
- Class: Insecta
- Order: Lepidoptera
- Family: Lecithoceridae
- Genus: Trichoboscis
- Species: T. pansarista

Binomial name
- Trichoboscis pansarista Meyrick, 1929

Species of moth

Trichoboscis pansarista is a moth in the family Lecithoceridae. It was described by Edward Meyrick in 1929. It is found in Sikkim, India.

The wingspan is about 15 mm.
