= Mnesteria sideraula =

Scientific classification
- Kingdom: Animalia
- Phylum: Arthropoda
- Class: Insecta
- Order: Lepidoptera
- Family: Lecithoceridae
- Genus: Mnesteria
- Species: M. sideraula

Binomial name
- Mnesteria sideraula Meyrick, 1916

Species of moth

Mnesteria sideraula is a moth in the family of Lecithoceridae. It was described by Edward Meyrick in 1916. It is found in Sri Lanka.

The wingspan is 16–18 mm. The forewings are pale brassy yellow, in females with the dorsal half deep ochreous yellow. There is a small spot of dark bluish-leaden suffusion on the base of the costa and a dark bluish-leaden-metallic streak from the base along the fold to beyond one-third, and a similar streak in the disc from one-third to two-thirds. In males, there is a rather thick dark fuscous median longitudinal streak from the base to the apex, including the two preceding, in females less strongly marked and on the anterior half of the wing more or less obsolete. The hindwings of the males are pale ochreous tinged with grey towards the costa, with a long dense pale ochreous hair-pencil lying along the submedian groove from the base. The female hindwings are grey.
