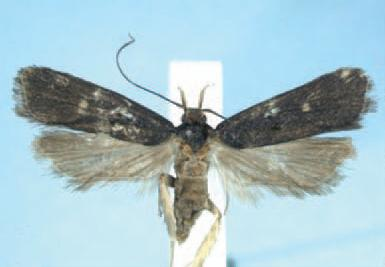
- Synersaga mondulkiriensis

Scientific classification
- Kingdom: Animalia
- Phylum: Arthropoda
- Clade: Pancrustacea
- Class: Insecta
- Order: Lepidoptera
- Family: Lecithoceridae
- Subfamily: Lecithocerinae
- Genus: Synersaga; Gozmány, 1978

Synonyms
- Anamimnesis Gozmány, 1978

= Synersaga =

Genus of moths

Synersaga is a genus of moths in the family Lecithoceridae.

== Species ==
- Synersaga atriptera (Xu & Wang, 2014)
- Synersaga bleszynskii (Gozmány, 1978)
- Synersaga breviclavata Liu & Wang, 2014
- Synersaga brevidigitata Liu & Wang, 2014
- Synersaga caradjai (Gozmány, 1978)
- Synersaga kuni Park, 2007
- Synersaga mondulkiriensis Park & Bae, 2012
- Synersaga nigriptera Park, 2007
- Synersaga phuruaensis Park, 2009
- Synersaga pseudocathra (Diakonoff, 1951)
