= Nosphistica cornutata =

Scientific classification
- Domain: Eukaryota
- Kingdom: Animalia
- Phylum: Arthropoda
- Class: Insecta
- Order: Lepidoptera
- Family: Lecithoceridae
- Genus: Nosphistica
- Species: N. cornutata

Binomial name
- Nosphistica cornutata (Rose, Pathania & Sood, 2007)

Synonyms
- Philoptila cornutata Rose, Pathania & Sood, 2007

Species of moth

Nosphistica cornutata is a moth in the family Lecithoceridae. It was described by Rose, Pathania and Sood in 2007. It is known from India.
