= Spatulignatha =

Scientific classification
- Kingdom: Animalia
- Phylum: Arthropoda
- Clade: Pancrustacea
- Class: Insecta
- Order: Lepidoptera
- Family: Lecithoceridae
- Subfamily: Lecithocerinae
- Genus: Spatulignatha; Gozmány, 1978

Genus of moths

Spatulignatha is a genus of moth in the family Lecithoceridae.

== Species ==
- Spatulignatha arcuata Liu & Wang, 2014
- Spatulignatha chrysopteryx Wu, 1994
- Spatulignatha hemichrysa (Meyrick, 1910)
- Spatulignatha idiogena C.S. Wu, 1994
- Spatulignatha longizonalis Liu & Wang, 2014
- Spatulignatha olaxana C.S.Wu, 1994
