= Heterodeltis =

Scientific classification
- Kingdom: Animalia
- Phylum: Arthropoda
- Class: Insecta
- Order: Lepidoptera
- Family: Lecithoceridae
- Subfamily: Lecithocerinae
- Genus: Heterodeltis; Meyrick, 1925

Genus of moths

Heterodeltis is a genus of moths in the family Lecithoceridae.

== Species ==
- Heterodeltis trichroa (Meyrick, 1906)
- Heterodeltis mentella (Felder & Rogenhofer, 1875)
