= Kalocyrma decurtata =

Scientific classification
- Kingdom: Animalia
- Phylum: Arthropoda
- Clade: Pancrustacea
- Class: Insecta
- Order: Lepidoptera
- Family: Lecithoceridae
- Genus: Kalocyrma
- Species: K. decurtata

Binomial name
- Kalocyrma decurtata Wu, 1994

Species of moth

Kalocyrma decurtata is a moth in the family Lecithoceridae. It was described by Chun-Sheng Wu in 1994. It is found in China.
