= Doxogenes pyrophanes =

Scientific classification
- Domain: Eukaryota
- Kingdom: Animalia
- Phylum: Arthropoda
- Class: Insecta
- Order: Lepidoptera
- Family: Lecithoceridae
- Genus: Doxogenes
- Species: D. pyrophanes

Binomial name
- Doxogenes pyrophanes (Meyrick, 1905)

Synonyms
- Tipha pyrophanes Meyrick, 1905

Species of moth

Doxogenes pyrophanes is a moth in the family Lecithoceridae. It was described by Edward Meyrick in 1905. It is found in Sri Lanka.

The wingspan of Doxogenes pyrophanes is about 20 millimetres. The forewings are deep orange, with the markings shining purplish leaden grey, with a small basal patch. There is a small spot in the disc at one-fifth and a very large patch occupying the entire apical two-thirds except towards the margins anteriorly, enclosing an irregularly triangular patch of ground colour in the disc at about three-fifths. The hindwings are grey.
