= Lacuniola =

Scientific classification
- Kingdom: Animalia
- Phylum: Arthropoda
- Class: Insecta
- Order: Lepidoptera
- Family: Lecithoceridae
- Subfamily: Lecithocerinae
- Genus: Lacuniola; Park, 2012
- Species: L. hadrorhacha

Binomial name
- Lacuniola hadrorhacha Park, 2012

Genus of moths

Lacuniola is a genus of moths in the family Lecithoceridae. It contains the species Lacuniola hadrorhacha, which is found in Papua New Guinea.
