= Mnesteria pharetrata =

Scientific classification
- Kingdom: Animalia
- Phylum: Arthropoda
- Class: Insecta
- Order: Lepidoptera
- Family: Lecithoceridae
- Genus: Mnesteria
- Species: M. pharetrata

Binomial name
- Mnesteria pharetrata (Meyrick, 1905)

Synonyms
- Tipha pharetrata Meyrick, 1905

Species of moth

Mnesteria pharetrata is a moth in the family Lecithoceridae. It was described by Edward Meyrick in 1905. It is found in Sri Lanka.

The wingspan is 20–21 mm. The forewings are orange, lighter and more ochreous tinged towards the costa and with shining silvery-bronze markings. There is a spot on the base of the costa and a line along the submedian fold from rather near the base to beyond the middle of the wing, as well as a longitudinal discal line from beyond one-third to three-fifths, dilated at the extremities, and a longitudinal spot above its posterior extremity. There are six streaks on the veins starting from beyond three-fifths, and running to the posterior part of the costa and termen. The hindwings are light yellowish fuscous in males and grey in females.
