= Pectinimura gilvicostata =

Scientific classification
- Domain: Eukaryota
- Kingdom: Animalia
- Phylum: Arthropoda
- Class: Insecta
- Order: Lepidoptera
- Family: Lecithoceridae
- Genus: Pectinimura
- Species: P. gilvicostata

Binomial name
- Pectinimura gilvicostata Park, 2011

Species of moth

Pectinimura gilvicostata is a moth in the family Lecithoceridae. It is found in Papua New Guinea.

The length of the forewings is 7.5–8 mm.
