= Siderostigma =

Scientific classification
- Kingdom: Animalia
- Phylum: Arthropoda
- Clade: Pancrustacea
- Class: Insecta
- Order: Lepidoptera
- Family: Lecithoceridae
- Subfamily: Lecithocerinae
- Genus: Siderostigma; Gozmány, 1973

Genus of moths

Siderostigma is a genus of moth in the family Lecithoceridae.

== Species ==
- Siderostigma symbolica Gozmány, 1973
- Siderostigma triatoma Gozmány, 1978
