= Ilioparsis =

Scientific classification
- Kingdom: Animalia
- Phylum: Arthropoda
- Clade: Pancrustacea
- Class: Insecta
- Order: Lepidoptera
- Family: Lecithoceridae
- Subfamily: Lecithocerinae
- Genus: Ilioparsis; Gozmány, 1973
- Species: I. effulgens

Binomial name
- Ilioparsis effulgens Gozmány, 1973

Genus of moths

Ilioparsis is a genus of moth in the family Lecithoceridae. It contains the species Ilioparsis effulgens, which is found in Nepal.
