= Spatulignatha hemichrysa =

Scientific classification
- Kingdom: Animalia
- Phylum: Arthropoda
- Class: Insecta
- Order: Lepidoptera
- Family: Lecithoceridae
- Genus: Spatulignatha
- Species: S. hemichrysa

Binomial name
- Spatulignatha hemichrysa (Meyrick, 1910)

Synonyms
- Lecithocera hemichrysa Meyrick, 1910

Species of moth

Spatulignatha hemichrysa is a moth in the family Lecithoceridae. It was described by Edward Meyrick in 1910. It is found in Assam, India.

The wingspan is 19–20 mm. The forewings are pale ochreous yellowish, irregularly sprinkled with dark fuscous and with the costal edge suffused with dark fuscous from the base to two-thirds. The discal stigmata are represented by small dark fuscous spots, the second lying on an oblique-transverse line of dark fuscous suffusion forming triangular suffused spots on the margins. Beyond this, all veins are marked with strong dark fuscous lines and there is a strong black line around the apex and termen. The hindwings are grey, tinged with pale yellowish towards the apex, the veins darker grey.
