= Eurodachtha siculella =

Scientific classification
- Kingdom: Animalia
- Phylum: Arthropoda
- Clade: Pancrustacea
- Class: Insecta
- Order: Lepidoptera
- Family: Lecithoceridae
- Genus: Eurodachtha
- Species: E. siculella

Binomial name
- Eurodachtha siculella (Wocke, 1889)

Synonyms
- Lecithocera siculella Wocke, 1889

Species of moth

Eurodachtha siculella is a moth in the family Lecithoceridae. It was described by Wocke in 1889. It is found on the Iberian Peninsula and in France, as well as on Sicily.

The wingspan is 11-11.5 mm. The forewings are light grey, with a weak satin glow and sprinkled darker at the margin and the lower third. There is a round deep black dot at the center of the wing, with a second bigger one at the end of the cell.
