= Scolizona ulnaformis =

Scientific classification
- Kingdom: Animalia
- Phylum: Arthropoda
- Class: Insecta
- Order: Lepidoptera
- Family: Lecithoceridae
- Genus: Scolizona
- Species: S. ulnaformis

Binomial name
- Scolizona ulnaformis Park, 2011

Species of moth

Scolizona ulnaformis is a moth in the family Lecithoceridae. It is found in Papua New Guinea.

The wingspan is 18–19 mm.

== Etymology ==
The species name is derived from Latin ulna (meaning elbow) and formis (meaning form) and refers to the shape of labial palpus.
