= Heterodeltis trichroa =

Scientific classification
- Kingdom: Animalia
- Phylum: Arthropoda
- Class: Insecta
- Order: Lepidoptera
- Family: Lecithoceridae
- Genus: Heterodeltis
- Species: H. trichroa

Binomial name
- Heterodeltis trichroa (Meyrick, 1906)

Synonyms
- Tipha trichroa Meyrick, 1906

Species of moth

Heterodeltis trichroa is a moth in the family Lecithoceridae. It was described by Edward Meyrick in 1906. It is found in Sri Lanka.

== Description ==
The wingspan is about 14 mm. The forewings are dark brown, with the basal third dark purple fuscous. There is a triangular white blotch on the dorsum beyond one-fourth, reaching more than halfway across the wing and a cloudy ochreous-yellow dot on the costa before the middle, as well as a triangular ochreous-yellow patch extending along the costa from the middle to four-fifths, and reaching more than halfway across the wing. The hindwings are rather dark fuscous, in males with a subdorsal furrow throughout, filled with very long expansible pale fuscous hairs.
