= Synersaga bleszynskii =

Scientific classification
- Kingdom: Animalia
- Phylum: Arthropoda
- Clade: Pancrustacea
- Class: Insecta
- Order: Lepidoptera
- Family: Lecithoceridae
- Genus: Synersaga
- Species: S. bleszynskii

Binomial name
- Synersaga bleszynskii (Gozmány, 1978)

Synonyms
- Anamimnesis bleszynskii Gozmány, 1978

Species of moth

Synersaga bleszynskii is a moth in the family Lecithoceridae. It is found in Taiwan and Zhejiang, China.

The wingspan is 30 mm, making it one of the largest species in Lecithoceridae.
