= Doxogenes brochias =

Scientific classification
- Domain: Eukaryota
- Kingdom: Animalia
- Phylum: Arthropoda
- Class: Insecta
- Order: Lepidoptera
- Family: Lecithoceridae
- Genus: Doxogenes
- Species: D. brochias

Binomial name
- Doxogenes brochias (Meyrick, 1905)

Synonyms
- Tipha brochias Meyrick, 1905

Species of moth

Doxogenes brochias is a moth in the family Lecithoceridae. It was described by Edward Meyrick in 1905. It is found in Sri Lanka.

The wingspan is about 20 mm. The forewings are orange, paler towards the costa and with bronzy-fuscous markings, which are darker edged and suffused with shining purplish leaden. There is an elongate costal blotch at the base, extended in the disc to connect with an elongate loop-shaped discal blotch reaching to three-fifths. There is a streak along the dorsum from near the base to beyond the middle and a terminal patch occupying the apical third, its anterior edge convex. The hindwings are dark fuscous with an irregular ochreous-yellow patch in the disc towards the base.
