= Sulciolus capra =

Scientific classification
- Domain: Eukaryota
- Kingdom: Animalia
- Phylum: Arthropoda
- Class: Insecta
- Order: Lepidoptera
- Family: Lecithoceridae
- Genus: Sulciolus
- Species: S. capra

Binomial name
- Sulciolus capra (Diakonoff, 1954)

Synonyms
- Lecithocera capra Diakonoff, 1954

Species of moth

Sulciolus capra is a moth in the family Lecithoceridae. It was described by Alexey Diakonoff in 1954. It is found in New Guinea.
