= Nosphistica undulata =

Scientific classification
- Kingdom: Animalia
- Phylum: Arthropoda
- Clade: Pancrustacea
- Class: Insecta
- Order: Lepidoptera
- Family: Lecithoceridae
- Genus: Nosphistica
- Species: N. undulata

Binomial name
- Nosphistica undulata Park, 2002

Species of moth

Nosphistica undulata is a moth in the family Lecithoceridae. It was described by Kyu-Tek Park in 2002. It is known from Thailand.
