= Neotimyra nemoralis =

Scientific classification
- Kingdom: Animalia
- Phylum: Arthropoda
- Clade: Pancrustacea
- Class: Insecta
- Order: Lepidoptera
- Family: Lecithoceridae
- Genus: Neotimyra
- Species: N. nemoralis

Binomial name
- Neotimyra nemoralis Park, 2011

Species of moth

Neotimyra nemoralis is a moth in the family Lecithoceridae. It was described by Kyu-Tek Park in 2011. It is found on New Guinea.
