= Sulciolus pachystoma =

Scientific classification
- Domain: Eukaryota
- Kingdom: Animalia
- Phylum: Arthropoda
- Class: Insecta
- Order: Lepidoptera
- Family: Lecithoceridae
- Genus: Sulciolus
- Species: S. pachystoma

Binomial name
- Sulciolus pachystoma (Diakonoff, 1954)

Synonyms
- Lecithocera pachystoma Diakonoff, 1954

Species of moth

Sulciolus pachystoma is a moth in the family Lecithoceridae. It was described by Alexey Diakonoff in 1954. It is found in New Guinea.
