= Trichoboscis crocosema =

Scientific classification
- Kingdom: Animalia
- Phylum: Arthropoda
- Class: Insecta
- Order: Lepidoptera
- Family: Lecithoceridae
- Genus: Trichoboscis
- Species: T. crocosema

Binomial name
- Trichoboscis crocosema (Meyrick, 1929)

Synonyms
- Lecithocera crocosema Meyrick, 1929

Species of moth

Trichoboscis crocosema is a moth in the family Lecithoceridae. It was described by Edward Meyrick in 1929. It is found in India's Andaman Islands.

The wingspan is 13–14 mm.
