= Pectinimura crassipalpis =

Scientific classification
- Kingdom: Animalia
- Phylum: Arthropoda
- Class: Insecta
- Order: Lepidoptera
- Family: Lecithoceridae
- Genus: Pectinimura
- Species: P. crassipalpis

Binomial name
- Pectinimura crassipalpis Park and Byun, 2008

Species of moth

Pectinimura crassipalpis is a moth in the family Lecithoceridae. It is found in Loei Province, Thailand. The wingspan is 17 mm. The hindwings are greyish brown.
