= Kalocyrma epileuca =

Scientific classification
- Kingdom: Animalia
- Phylum: Arthropoda
- Clade: Pancrustacea
- Class: Insecta
- Order: Lepidoptera
- Family: Lecithoceridae
- Genus: Kalocyrma
- Species: K. epileuca

Binomial name
- Kalocyrma epileuca Wu & Park, 1999

Species of moth

Kalocyrma epileuca is a moth in the family Lecithoceridae. It was described by Chun-Sheng Wu and Kyu-Tek Park in 1999. It is found in Sri Lanka.

The wingspan is about 9 mm. The forewings are milky white with a brownish pattern. The cell dot is small and there are two well-defined discal spots. The hindwings are light brown.

== Etymology ==
The species name is derived from Greek epileucos (meaning whitish).
