= Scolizona rhinoceros =

Scientific classification
- Kingdom: Animalia
- Phylum: Arthropoda
- Class: Insecta
- Order: Lepidoptera
- Family: Lecithoceridae
- Genus: Scolizona
- Species: S. rhinoceros

Binomial name
- Scolizona rhinoceros (Diakonoff, 1954) Park, 2011

Synonyms
- Lecithocera rhinoceros Diakonoff, 1954

Species of moth

Scolizona rhinoceros is a moth in the family Lecithoceridae. It is found in Papua province (once called Irian Jaya) of Indonesia.

The wingspan is 19–21 mm.
