= Eurodachtha rotundina =

Scientific classification
- Kingdom: Animalia
- Phylum: Arthropoda
- Clade: Pancrustacea
- Class: Insecta
- Order: Lepidoptera
- Family: Lecithoceridae
- Genus: Eurodachtha
- Species: E. rotundina

Binomial name
- Eurodachtha rotundina Park, 2009

Species of moth

Eurodachtha rotundina is a species of moth in the family Lecithoceridae. It was described by Kyu-Tek Park in 2009 and is found in Thailand.
