= Synersaga brevidigitata =

Scientific classification
- Kingdom: Animalia
- Phylum: Arthropoda
- Clade: Pancrustacea
- Class: Insecta
- Order: Lepidoptera
- Family: Lecithoceridae
- Genus: Synersaga
- Species: S. brevidigitata

Binomial name
- Synersaga brevidigitata Liu & Wang, 2014

Species of moth

Synersaga brevidigitata is a moth in the family Lecithoceridae. It is found in China (Yunnan).
