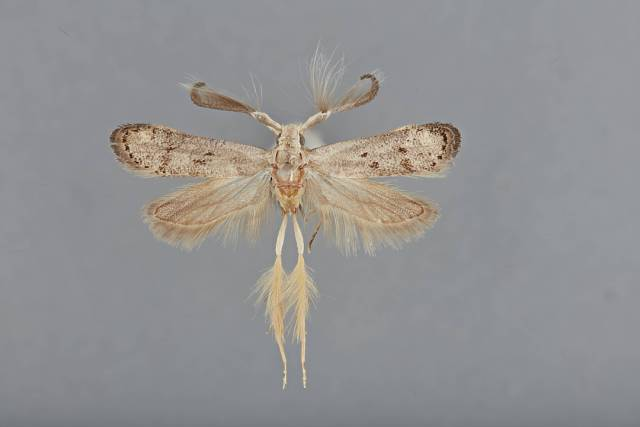

Scientific classification
- Kingdom: Animalia
- Phylum: Arthropoda
- Class: Insecta
- Order: Lepidoptera
- Family: Lecithoceridae
- Genus: Neopectinimura
- Species: N. morobeensis

Binomial name
- Neopectinimura morobeensis Park & Byun, 2010

= Neopectinimura morobeensis =

Species of moth

Neopectinimura morobeensis is a moth in the family Lecithoceridae. It is found in Papua New Guinea.

The wingspan is 10 mm.

== Etymology ==
The species name is derived from Morobe, the type locality.
