= Procharista =

Scientific classification
- Domain: Eukaryota
- Kingdom: Animalia
- Phylum: Arthropoda
- Class: Insecta
- Order: Lepidoptera
- Family: Lecithoceridae
- Subfamily: Lecithocerinae
- Genus: Procharista; Meyrick, 1922

Genus of moths

Procharista is a genus of moths in the family Lecithoceridae.

== Species ==
- Procharista ranongensis Park, 2009
- Procharista sardonias Meyrick, 1922
- Procharista spectabilosa Park, 2009
