= Crinellus =

Scientific classification
- Kingdom: Animalia
- Phylum: Arthropoda
- Class: Insecta
- Order: Lepidoptera
- Family: Lecithoceridae
- Subfamily: Lecithocerinae
- Genus: Crinellus; Park, 2012
- Species: C. eremicus

Binomial name
- Crinellus eremicus Park, 2012

Genus of moths

Crinellus is a genus of moths in the family Lecithoceridae. It contains the species Crinellus eremicus, which is found in Papua New Guinea.
