= Synersaga caradjai =

Scientific classification
- Kingdom: Animalia
- Phylum: Arthropoda
- Clade: Pancrustacea
- Class: Insecta
- Order: Lepidoptera
- Family: Lecithoceridae
- Genus: Synersaga
- Species: S. caradjai

Binomial name
- Synersaga caradjai Gozmány, 1978

Species of moth

Synersaga caradjai is a moth in the family Lecithoceridae. It is found in Taiwan.

The wingspan is 30 mm, making it one of the largest species in the family Lecithoceridae.
