= Telephata nitens =

Scientific classification
- Domain: Eukaryota
- Kingdom: Animalia
- Phylum: Arthropoda
- Class: Insecta
- Order: Lepidoptera
- Family: Lecithoceridae
- Genus: Telephata
- Species: T. nitens

Binomial name
- Telephata nitens (Diakonoff, 1954)

Synonyms
- Lecithocera nitens Diakonoff, 1954

Species of moth

Telephata nitens is a moth in the family Lecithoceridae. It was described by Alexey Diakonoff in 1954. It is found in New Guinea.
