= Oxygnostis =

Scientific classification
- Kingdom: Animalia
- Phylum: Arthropoda
- Class: Insecta
- Order: Lepidoptera
- Family: Lecithoceridae
- Subfamily: Lecithocerinae
- Genus: Oxygnostis; Meyrick, 1925
- Species: O. diacma

Binomial name
- Oxygnostis diacma (Meyrick, 1906)

Synonyms
- Tipha diacma Meyrick, 1906

Genus of moths

Oxygnostis is a genus of moth in the family Lecithoceridae. It contains the species Oxygnostis diacma, which is found in Sri Lanka.

The wingspan is 17–22 mm. The forewings are dull orange-yellow with a minute metallic-grey black-edged basal mark. There is a small dark metallic-grey black-mixed spot in the disc near the base. There are three indistinct cloudy rather broad pale fuscous fasciae, the first at one-fourth, angulated in the middle, the second oblique, from towards the middle of the costa to before the tornus, the third oblique, about three-fourths, little marked. There are five linear longitudinal dark metallic-grey streaks mixed with black, two on the first fascia in the middle and on the fold, one on the second fascia in the middle, and two stronger starting on the anterior edge of the third fascia and continued along the costa and the termen respectively almost meeting at the apex. The hindwings are grey, in males with a longitudinal median furrow throughout, suffused with whitish-ochreous, suffusion extending around the apex, and a long ochreous-yellow hair-pencil from the base, lying in a groove beneath the cell, the tornal area clothed with modified dark grey hair-scales.
