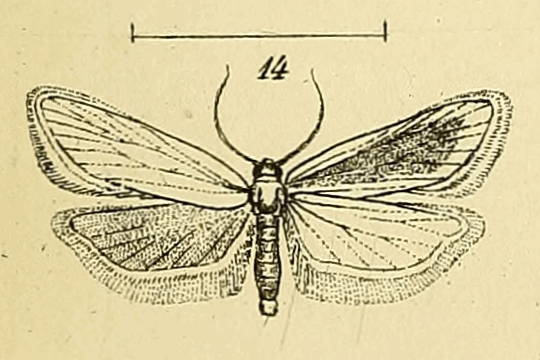
- Eurodachtha flavissimella

Scientific classification
- Kingdom: Animalia
- Phylum: Arthropoda
- Clade: Pancrustacea
- Class: Insecta
- Order: Lepidoptera
- Family: Lecithoceridae
- Subfamily: Lecithocerinae
- Genus: Eurodachtha; Gozmány in Amsel et al., 1978

= Eurodachtha =

Genus of moths

Eurodachtha is a genus of moths in the family Lecithoceridae.

== Species ==
- Eurodachtha pallicornella (Staudinger, 1859)
- Eurodachtha canigella (Caradja, 1920)
- Eurodachtha siculella (Wocke, 1889)
- Eurodachtha flavissimella (Mann, 1862)
- Eurodachtha nigralba Gozmány, 1978
- Eurodachtha rotundina Park, 2009
