= Neopectinimura calligina =

Scientific classification
- Kingdom: Animalia
- Phylum: Arthropoda
- Clade: Pancrustacea
- Class: Insecta
- Order: Lepidoptera
- Family: Lecithoceridae
- Genus: Neopectinimura
- Species: N. calligina

Binomial name
- Neopectinimura calligina Park and Byun, 2010

Species of moth

Neopectinimura calligina is a moth in the family Lecithoceridae. It is found in Papua New Guinea.
