= Heterodeltis mentella =

Scientific classification
- Kingdom: Animalia
- Phylum: Arthropoda
- Class: Insecta
- Order: Lepidoptera
- Family: Lecithoceridae
- Genus: Heterodeltis
- Species: H. mentella

Binomial name
- Heterodeltis mentella (C. Felder, R. Felder & Rogenhofer, 1875)

Synonyms
- Oecophora mentella Felder & Rogenhofer, 1875

Species of moth

Heterodeltis mentella is a species of moth in the family Lecithoceridae. It was described in 1875 byCajetan Felder, Rudolf Felder and Alois Friedrich Rogenhofer.
