= Amaloxestis chiloptila =

Scientific classification
- Kingdom: Animalia
- Phylum: Arthropoda
- Class: Insecta
- Order: Lepidoptera
- Family: Lecithoceridae
- Genus: Amaloxestis
- Species: A. chiloptila

Binomial name
- Amaloxestis chiloptila (Meyrick, 1921)

Synonyms
- Homaloxestis chiloptila Meyrick, 1921

Species of moth

Amaloxestis chiloptila is a moth in the family Lecithoceridae. It was described by Edward Meyrick in 1921. It is found in Assam, India.

The wingspan is about 20 mm. The forewings are light ochreous, irregularly speckled with fuscous and with the costa suffused with fuscous from the base to three-fourths. The discal stigmata are dark fuscous and there is a rather narrow suffused rather dark fuscous terminal fascia. The hindwings are grey.
