= Lecitholaxa =

Scientific classification
- Kingdom: Animalia
- Phylum: Arthropoda
- Clade: Pancrustacea
- Class: Insecta
- Order: Lepidoptera
- Family: Lecithoceridae
- Subfamily: Lecithocerinae
- Genus: Lecitholaxa; Gozmány, 1978

Genus of moths

Lecitholaxa is a genus of moths of the family Lecithoceridae.

== Species ==
- Lecitholaxa kumatai Gozmány, 1978
- Lecitholaxa thiodora (Meyrick, 1914)
- Lecitholaxa zopheropis (Meyrick, 1931)
