= Neopectinimura =

Scientific classification
- Kingdom: Animalia
- Phylum: Arthropoda
- Class: Insecta
- Order: Lepidoptera
- Family: Lecithoceridae
- Subfamily: Lecithocerinae
- Genus: Neopectinimura; Park, 2010

Genus of moths

Neopectinimura is a genus of moths in the family Lecithoceridae.

== Species ==
- Neopectinimura beckeri Park, 2010
- Neopectinimura calligina Park and Byun, 2010
- Neopectinimura devosi Park, 2014
- Neopectinimura madangensis Park and Byun, 2010
- Neopectinimura morobeensis Park and Byun, 2010
- Neopectinimura setiola Park and Byun, 2010
- Neopectinimura trichodes Park, 2014
- Neopectinimura walmakensis Park, 2014
