= Neopectinimura beckeri =

Scientific classification
- Kingdom: Animalia
- Phylum: Arthropoda
- Class: Insecta
- Order: Lepidoptera
- Family: Lecithoceridae
- Genus: Neopectinimura
- Species: N. beckeri

Binomial name
- Neopectinimura beckeri Park, 2010

Species of moth

Neopectinimura beckeri is a moth in the family Lecithoceridae. It is found in Papua New Guinea.

The wingspan is 11.5–12 mm.

== Etymology ==
The species is named for the collector, Dr. V. O. Becker who is a microlepidoptera specialist in Brazil.
