= Doxogenes =

Scientific classification
- Kingdom: Animalia
- Phylum: Arthropoda
- Class: Insecta
- Order: Lepidoptera
- Family: Lecithoceridae
- Subfamily: Lecithocerinae
- Genus: Doxogenes; Meyrick, 1925

Genus of moths

Doxogenes is a genus of moth in the family Lecithoceridae.

== Species ==
- Doxogenes argyreodema Wu & Park, 1999
- Doxogenes brochias (Meyrick, 1905)
- Doxogenes ceraena Wu & Park, 1999
- Doxogenes ecliptica (Meyrick, 1908)
- Doxogenes henicosura Wu & Park, 1999
- Doxogenes phalaritis (Meyrick, 1905)
- Doxogenes philodoxa (Meyrick, 1908)
- Doxogenes pyrophanes (Meyrick, 1905)
- Doxogenes spectralis (Meyrick, 1905)
- Doxogenes thoracias (Meyrick, 1908)
