= Parelliptis scytalias =

Scientific classification
- Kingdom: Animalia
- Phylum: Arthropoda
- Class: Insecta
- Order: Lepidoptera
- Family: Lecithoceridae
- Genus: Parelliptis
- Species: P. scytalias

Binomial name
- Parelliptis scytalias Meyrick, 1910

Species of moth

Parelliptis scytalias is a moth in the family Lecithoceridae. It was described by Edward Meyrick in 1910. It is found in Sri Lanka.

The wingspan is 14–15 mm (0.55–0.59 in). The forewings are whitish ochreous, with some scattered fuscous or dark fuscous specks and with the costal edge dark fuscous towards the base. The discal stigmata are blackish. There is a rather dark fuscous streak along the dorsum from one-fourth to three-fourths, broad in the middle and narrowed to the extremities. The posterior area from the second discal stigma is pale ochreous suffused with fuscous except towards the costa, undefined anteriorly, darker fuscous towards the termen. The hindwings are grey, paler anteriorly.
