= Synersaga breviclavata =

Scientific classification
- Domain: Eukaryota
- Kingdom: Animalia
- Phylum: Arthropoda
- Class: Insecta
- Order: Lepidoptera
- Family: Lecithoceridae
- Genus: Synersaga
- Species: S. breviclavata

Binomial name
- Synersaga breviclavata Liu & Wang, 2014

Species of moth

Synersaga breviclavata is a moth in the family Lecithoceridae. It is found in China (Shaanxi).
