= Synersaga kuni =

Scientific classification
- Domain: Eukaryota
- Kingdom: Animalia
- Phylum: Arthropoda
- Class: Insecta
- Order: Lepidoptera
- Family: Lecithoceridae
- Genus: Synersaga
- Species: S. kuni

Binomial name
- Synersaga kuni Park, 2007

Species of moth

Synersaga kuni is a moth in the family Lecithoceridae. It is found in Vietnam.
