= Achoria =

Scientific classification
- Kingdom: Animalia
- Phylum: Arthropoda
- Clade: Pancrustacea
- Class: Insecta
- Order: Lepidoptera
- Family: Lecithoceridae
- Subfamily: Lecithocerinae
- Genus: Achoria; Meyrick, 1904
- Species: A. inopina

Binomial name
- Achoria inopina Meyrick, 1904

Genus of moths

Achoria is a monotypic genus of moth in the family Lecithoceridae. It contains the species Achoria inopina, which is found in Australia, where it has been recorded from New South Wales.

The wingspan is 11–12 mm (0.43–0.47 in). The forewings are whitish-ochreous suffusedly irrorated throughout with dark bronzy-fuscous. The hindwings are pale fuscous, with the basal and discal areas wholly tawny-ochreous.
