= Parelliptis =

Scientific classification
- Kingdom: Animalia
- Phylum: Arthropoda
- Class: Insecta
- Order: Lepidoptera
- Family: Lecithoceridae
- Subfamily: Lecithocerinae
- Genus: Parelliptis; Meyrick, 1910

Genus of moths

Parelliptis is a genus of moth in the family Lecithoceridae.

== Species ==
- Parelliptis librata Meyrick, 1910
- Parelliptis scytalias Meyrick, 1910
- Parelliptis sporochlora (Meyrick, 1929)
