= Doxogenes ecliptica =

Scientific classification
- Domain: Eukaryota
- Kingdom: Animalia
- Phylum: Arthropoda
- Class: Insecta
- Order: Lepidoptera
- Family: Lecithoceridae
- Genus: Doxogenes
- Species: D. ecliptica

Binomial name
- Doxogenes ecliptica (Meyrick, 1908)

Synonyms
- Tingentera ecliptica Meyrick, 1908

Species of moth

Doxogenes ecliptica is a moth in the family Lecithoceridae. It was described by Edward Meyrick in 1908. It is found in Sri Lanka.

The wingspan is about 17 mm. The forewings are dark purplish fuscous, posteriorly broadly suffused with metallic bronze and with a deep fiery orange band occupying the basal two-fifths of the wing except a very small basal patch, the posterior edge concave, emitting a narrow subdorsal projection to beyond the middle. In the middle of this band is a small leaden-metallic spot. The hindwings are dark fuscous with rather broad pale orange costal and submedian streaks of modified scales, confluent towards the base, the latter grooved towards the base and enclosing an expansible pencil of long pale orange hairs.
