= Dragmatucha =

Scientific classification
- Domain: Eukaryota
- Kingdom: Animalia
- Phylum: Arthropoda
- Class: Insecta
- Order: Lepidoptera
- Family: Lecithoceridae
- Genus: Dragmatucha; Meyrick, 1908

Genus of moths

Dragmatucha is a genus of moths in the family Lecithoceridae.

== Species ==
- Dragmatucha bivia Meyrick, 1918
- Dragmatucha proaula Meyrick, 1908
