= Tegenocharis =

Scientific classification
- Kingdom: Animalia
- Phylum: Arthropoda
- Clade: Pancrustacea
- Class: Insecta
- Order: Lepidoptera
- Family: Lecithoceridae
- Genus: Tegenocharis; Gozmány, 1973
- Species: T. tenebrans

Binomial name
- Tegenocharis tenebrans Gozmány, 1973

Genus of moths

Tegenocharis is a genus of moth in the family Lecithoceridae. It contains the species Tegenocharis tenebrans, which is found in Nepal.
