= Rhizosthenes =

Scientific classification
- Kingdom: Animalia
- Phylum: Arthropoda
- Class: Insecta
- Order: Lepidoptera
- Family: Lecithoceridae
- Genus: Rhizosthenes; Meyrick in Caradja & Meyrick, 1935
- Species: R. falciformis

Binomial name
- Rhizosthenes falciformis Meyrick, 1935

Genus of moths

Rhizosthenes is a genus of moth in the family Lecithoceridae. It contains the species Rhizosthenes falciformis, which is found in China, Taiwan, Japan and Russia.

The wingspan is 22–27 mm.
