= Teucrodoxa =

Scientific classification
- Kingdom: Animalia
- Phylum: Arthropoda
- Class: Insecta
- Order: Lepidoptera
- Family: Lecithoceridae
- Genus: Teucrodoxa; Meyrick, 1925

Genus of moths

Teucrodoxa is a genus of moth in the family Lecithoceridae.

== Species ==
- Teucrodoxa monetella (Felder & Rogenhofer, 1875)
- Teucrodoxa spiculifera (Meyrick, 1918)
