= Scolizona =

Scientific classification
- Kingdom: Animalia
- Phylum: Arthropoda
- Class: Insecta
- Order: Lepidoptera
- Family: Lecithoceridae
- Genus: Scolizona; Park, 2011

Type species
- Lecithocera rhinoceros Diakonoff, 1954

Genus of moths

Scolizona is a genus of moths in the family Lecithoceridae.

== Species ==
Three species were included in Kyu-Tek Park's circumscription:

- Scolizona palinoides Park, 2011
- Scolizona rhinoceros (Diakonoff, 1954)
- Scolizona ulnaformis Park, 2011

== Distribution ==
Papua province of Indonesia and Papua New Guinea.
