= Ziczac =

Ziczac may refer to:

- Abryna ziczac, species of beetle in the family Cerambycidae
- Archiminolia ziczac, species of sea snail in the family Solariellidae
- Cereopsius ziczac, species of beetle in the family Cerambycidae
- Conus ziczac, species of sea snail in the family Conidae
- Echinolittorina ziczac, species of small sea snail in the family Littorinidae
- Eligmoderma ziczac, species of beetle in the family Cerambycidae
- Enixotrophon ziczac, species of sea snail in the family Muricidae
- Eunidia ziczac, species of beetle in the family Cerambycidae
- Euvola ziczac , species of bivalve mollusc in the family Pectinidae
- Frea ziczac, species of beetle in the family Cerambycidae
- Lasiocercis ziczac, species of beetle in the family Cerambycidae
- Loxostege ziczac, species of moth in the family Crambidae
- Metamulciber ziczac, species of beetle in the family Cerambycidae
- Miltochrista ziczac, species of moth in the family Erebidae
- Nitidula ziczac, species of sap-feeding beetle in the family Nitidulidae
- Notodonta ziczac, species of moth of the family Notodontidae
- Palmadusta ziczac, species of sea snail in the family Cypraeidae, the cowries
- Phyllalia ziczac, species of moth in the family Eupterotidae
- Pterolophia ziczac, species of beetle in the family Cerambycidae
- Similosodus ziczac, species of beetle in the family Cerambycidae
- Tmesisternus ziczac, species of beetle in the family Cerambycidae
- Volutomitra ziczac, species of sea snail in the family Volutomitridae
