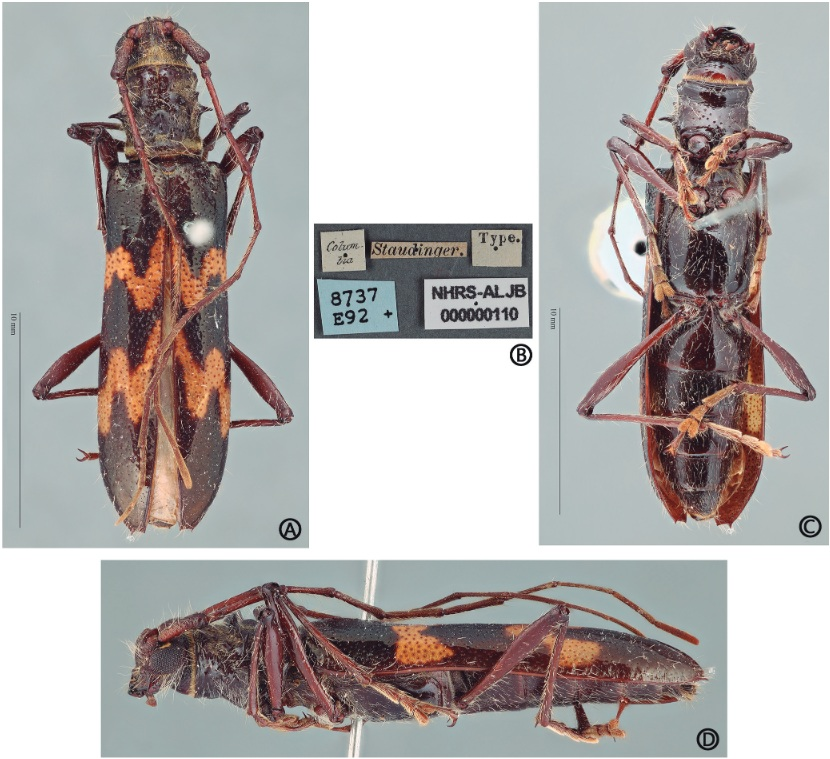

Scientific classification
- Kingdom: Animalia
- Phylum: Arthropoda
- Clade: Pancrustacea
- Class: Insecta
- Order: Coleoptera
- Suborder: Polyphaga
- Infraorder: Cucujiformia
- Family: Cerambycidae
- Genus: Eligmoderma
- Species: E. spinicolle

Binomial name
- Eligmoderma spinicolle Aurivillius, 1924

= Eligmoderma spinicolle =

Species of beetle

Eligmoderma spinicolle is a species of beetle of the family Cerambycidae. It is found in Colombia.

== Taxonomy ==
Eligmoderma spinicolle was placed as a synonym of Eligmoderma ibidionoides by Martins and Galileo in 2009. In 2026, spinicolle was reinstantated as a valid species. The holotype male of ibidionoides differs from the holotype female of spinicolle and the male and female of also related Eligmoderma ziczac as follows: the pedicel and antennomeres III-IV are coarsely punctate (finely punctate in spinicolle and ziczac) and the elytral punctures are much coarser on the anterior third of the dark integumental area (finer spinicolle and ziczac). The anterior yellowish elytral macula does not reach the lateral margin, reaching only the superior region of the epipleura (while it almost reaches the epipleural margin in spinicolle and reaches it in ziczac). Also, the mesoventral process is distinctly narrower (wider in spinicolle and ziczac). These features are probably not dimorphic traits because they are not sexually variable in the other species of the genus.
