= Eligmoderma politum =

Scientific classification
- Kingdom: Animalia
- Phylum: Arthropoda
- Clade: Pancrustacea
- Class: Insecta
- Order: Coleoptera
- Suborder: Polyphaga
- Infraorder: Cucujiformia
- Family: Cerambycidae
- Genus: Eligmoderma
- Species: E. politum

Binomial name
- Eligmoderma politum Nonfried, 1895

Species of beetle

Eligmoderma politum is a species of beetle in the family Cerambycidae. It was described by Nonfried in 1895. It is found in Panama.

== Description ==
They are shiny black brown and very sparsely pubescent, the elytra with orangish-red longitudinal bands. The head is densely punctate, with a smooth median vertex. The antennal tubercles are moderately bordered and are not as closely set as in Eligmoderma ziczac, with the space between them coarsely wrinkled.
