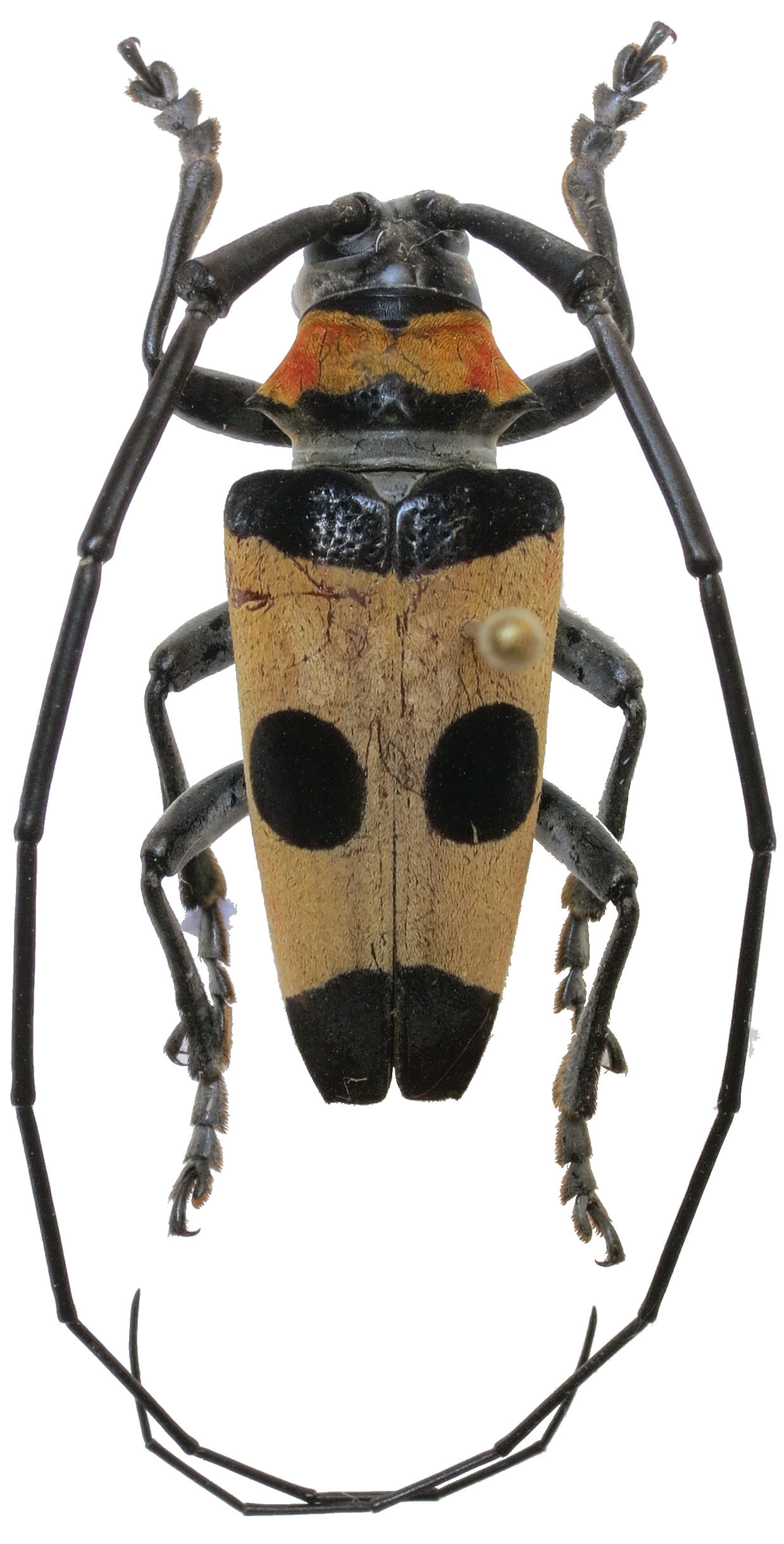
- Cereopsius questor nigrobasilis from Philippines

Scientific classification
- Kingdom: Animalia
- Phylum: Arthropoda
- Class: Insecta
- Order: Coleoptera
- Suborder: Polyphaga
- Infraorder: Cucujiformia
- Family: Cerambycidae
- Genus: Cereopsius
- Species: C. quaestor

Binomial name
- Cereopsius quaestor (Newman, 1842)

Synonyms
- Cereopsius quaestor m. reductemaculatus Breuning, 1980; Monohammus? quaestor Newman, 1842

= Cereopsius quaestor =

Species of beetle

Cereopsius quaestor is a species of beetle in the family Cerambycidae. It was described by Newman in 1842, originally under the genus Monohammus. It is known from the Philippines and Moluccas.

== Varietas ==
- Cereopsius quaestor var. confluens Breuning, 1944
- Cereopsius quaestor var. luctuosus Pascoe, 1866
- Cereopsius quaestor var. nigrobasalis Kriesche, 1928
- Cereopsius quaestor var. tricinctus Pascoe, 1866
