= Lasiocercis =

Scientific classification
- Kingdom: Animalia
- Phylum: Arthropoda
- Class: Insecta
- Order: Coleoptera
- Suborder: Polyphaga
- Infraorder: Cucujiformia
- Family: Cerambycidae
- Tribe: Crossotini
- Genus: Lasiocercis; Waterhouse, 1882

Genus of beetles

Lasiocercis is a genus of longhorn beetles of the subfamily Lamiinae.

== Species ==
=== Subgenus Coptomimus ===
- Lasiocercis albosignata Breuning, 1965
- Lasiocercis bipenicillata (Fairmaire, 1904)
- Lasiocercis catalai (Lepesme & Villiers, 1944)
- Lasiocercis ciliata (Lepesme & Villiers, 1944)
- Lasiocercis fuscosignatus Breuning, 1970
- Lasiocercis madagascariensis Breuning, 1945
- Lasiocercis nigropunctatus Breuning, 1966
- Lasiocercis ochreoapicalis Breuning, 1957
- Lasiocercis ochreopicta Breuning, 1980
- Lasiocercis pilosa Breuning, 1957
- Lasiocercis rufotibialis Breuning, 1957
- Lasiocercis viossati Breuning, 1970
- Lasiocercis ziczac Breuning, 1970

=== Subgenus Lasiocercis ===
- Lasiocercis affinis Breuning, 1965
- Lasiocercis bigibba (Fairmaire, 1896)
- Lasiocercis bigibboides Breuning, 1970
- Lasiocercis fasciata Waterhouse, 1882
- Lasiocercis limbolaria (Fairmaire, 1894)
- Lasiocercis nigrofasciata Breuning, 1964
- Lasiocercis nigrosignata Breuning, 1965
- Lasiocercis niveosignata Breuning, 1957
- Lasiocercis ochreomaculata Breuning, 1965
- Lasiocercis paraperroti Breuning, 1969
- Lasiocercis parvula Breuning, 1965
- Lasiocercis perroti Breuning, 1957
- Lasiocercis posticefasciata (Lepesme & Villiers, 1944)
- Lasiocercis semiarcuata Breuning, 1957
- Lasiocercis similis Breuning, 1965
- Lasiocercis subbigibboides Breuning, 1971
- Lasiocercis transversefasciata Breuning, 1965
- Lasiocercis tricoloripennis Breuning, 1965
- Lasiocercis truncata (Lepesme & Villiers, 1944)
- Lasiocercis truncatoides Breuning, 1975
- Lasiocercis vadoni Breuning, 1957
- Lasiocercis villiersi Breuning, 1940
- Lasiocercis viridana Breuning, 1940

=== Subgenus Mistocles ===
- Lasiocercis elegantula Fairmaire, 1899

=== Subgenus Paramistocles ===
- Lasiocercis medioflava Breuning, 1980
