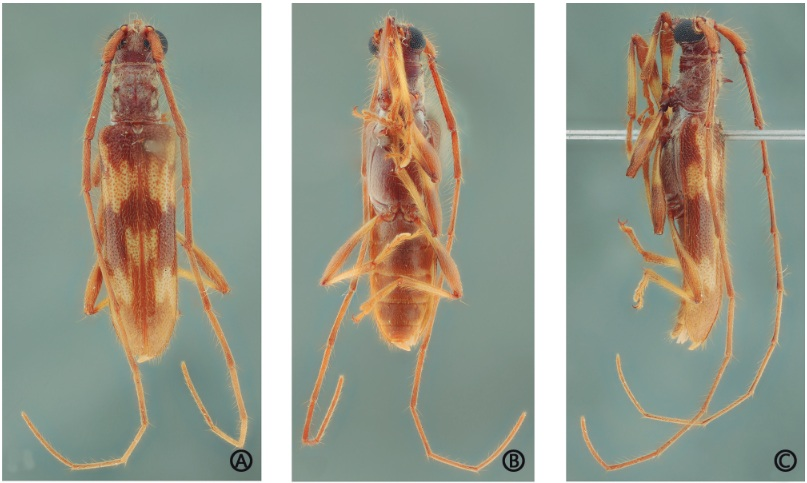

Scientific classification
- Kingdom: Animalia
- Phylum: Arthropoda
- Clade: Pancrustacea
- Class: Insecta
- Order: Coleoptera
- Suborder: Polyphaga
- Infraorder: Cucujiformia
- Family: Cerambycidae
- Genus: Eligmoderma
- Species: E. aragua

Binomial name
- Eligmoderma aragua Martins & Galileo, 2009

= Eligmoderma aragua =

Species of beetle

Eligmoderma aragua is a species of beetle in the family Cerambycidae. It was described by Martins and Galileo in 2009. It is found in Venezuela (Bolívar and Aragua).
