= Cereopsius amabilis =

Scientific classification
- Kingdom: Animalia
- Phylum: Arthropoda
- Class: Insecta
- Order: Coleoptera
- Suborder: Polyphaga
- Infraorder: Cucujiformia
- Family: Cerambycidae
- Genus: Cereopsius
- Species: C. amabilis

Binomial name
- Cereopsius amabilis Aurivillius, 1913

Species of beetle

Cereopsius amabilis is a species of beetle in the family Cerambycidae. It was described by Per Olof Christopher Aurivillius in 1913. It is native to Thailand and Borneo. The larvae of this beetle usually bore into wood and can cause damage to the trunk of living or felled wood.
