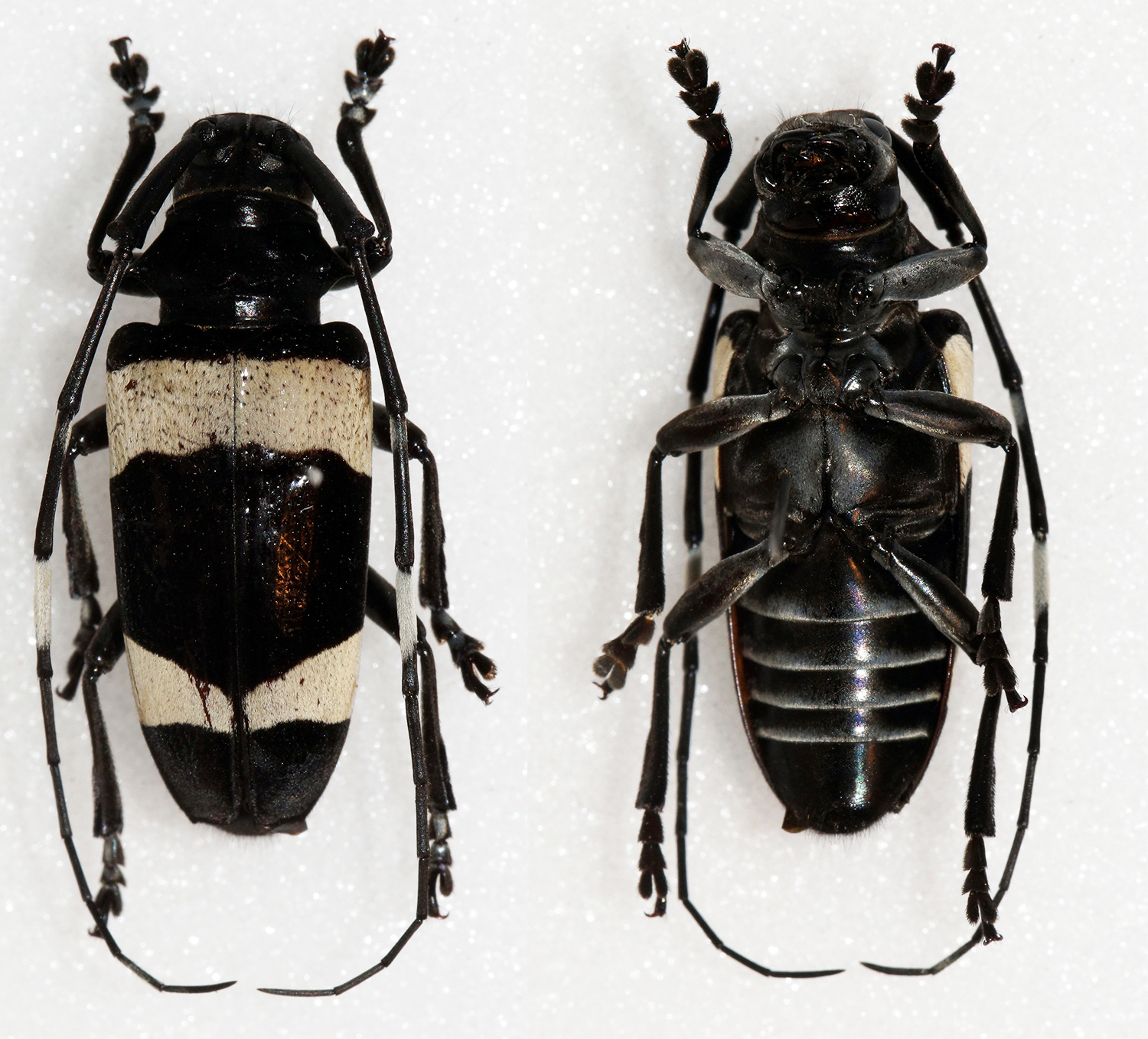

Scientific classification
- Kingdom: Animalia
- Phylum: Arthropoda
- Clade: Pancrustacea
- Class: Insecta
- Order: Coleoptera
- Suborder: Polyphaga
- Infraorder: Cucujiformia
- Family: Cerambycidae
- Genus: Cereopsius
- Species: C. luhuanus

Binomial name
- Cereopsius luhuanus Heller, 1896

Synonyms
- Cereopsius praetorius samanganus Heller, 1898; Cereopsius samanganus Heller, 1898

= Cereopsius luhuanus =

Species of beetle

Cereopsius luhuanus is a species of beetle in the family Cerambycidae. It was described by Heller in 1896. It is known from Sulawesi and Moluccas.

== Subspecies ==
- Cereopsius luhuanus luhuanus Heller, 1896
- Cereopsius luhuanus ternatensis Breuning, 1956
