= Limozota =

Scientific classification
- Kingdom: Animalia
- Phylum: Arthropoda
- Class: Insecta
- Order: Coleoptera
- Suborder: Polyphaga
- Infraorder: Cucujiformia
- Family: Cerambycidae
- Subfamily: Cerambycinae
- Tribe: Eligmodermini
- Genus: Limozota; Pascoe, 1866
- Species: L. virgata

Binomial name
- Limozota virgata Pascoe, 1866

Species of beetle

Limozota virgata is a species of beetle in the family Cerambycidae, and the only species in the genus Limozota. It was described by Pascoe in 1866.
