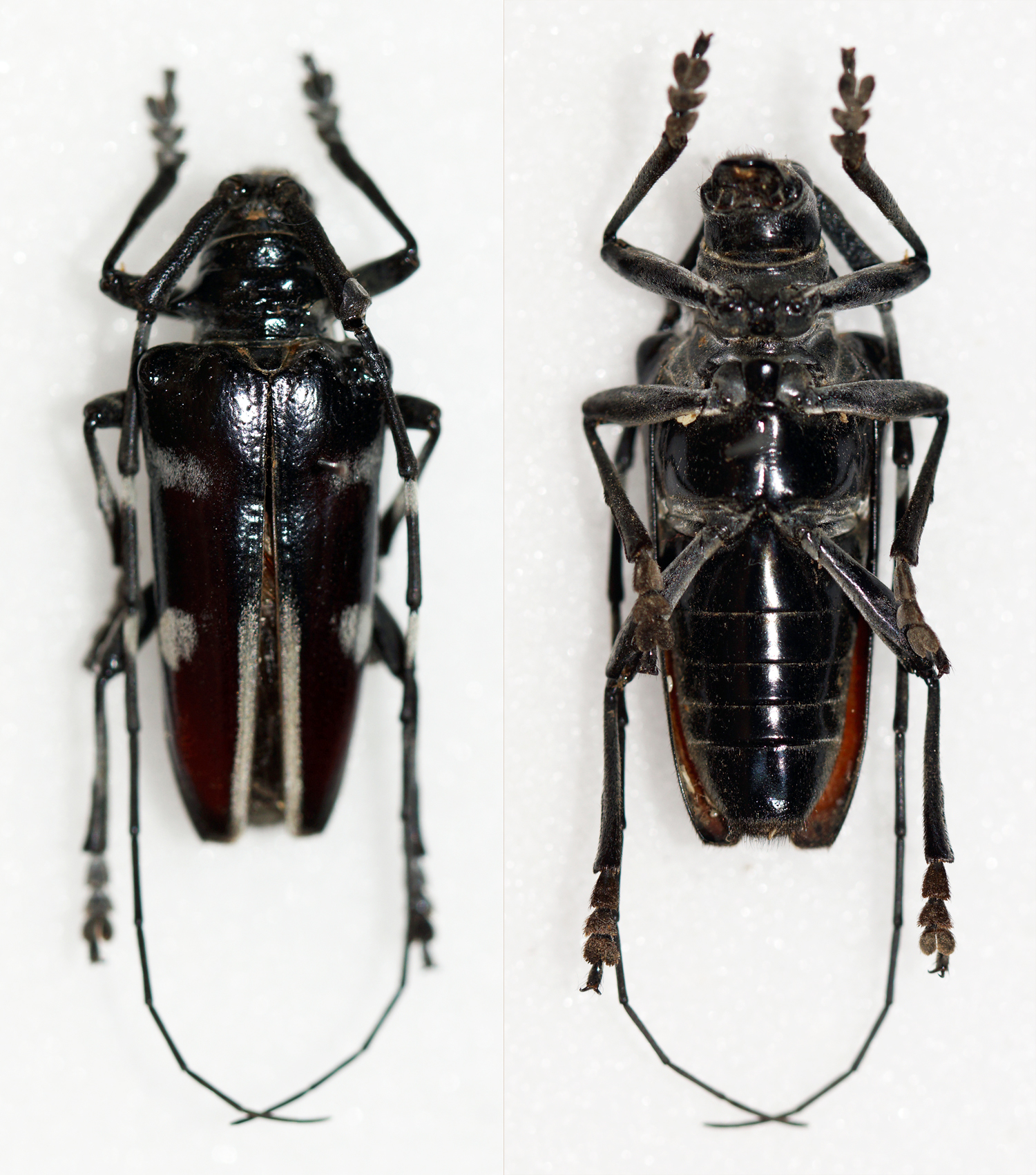

Scientific classification
- Domain: Eukaryota
- Kingdom: Animalia
- Phylum: Arthropoda
- Class: Insecta
- Order: Coleoptera
- Suborder: Polyphaga
- Infraorder: Cucujiformia
- Family: Cerambycidae
- Tribe: Lamiini
- Genus: Cereopsius
- Species: C. erasmus

Binomial name
- Cereopsius erasmus Medina, Mantilla, Cabras & Vitali, 2021

= Cereopsius erasmus =

Species of beetle

Cereopsius arbiter is a species of beetle in the family Cerambycidae. It was described by Medina, Mantilla, Cabras and Vitali in 2021. It is known from the Philippines.
