= Cereopsius whitei =

Scientific classification
- Domain: Eukaryota
- Kingdom: Animalia
- Phylum: Arthropoda
- Class: Insecta
- Order: Coleoptera
- Suborder: Polyphaga
- Infraorder: Cucujiformia
- Family: Cerambycidae
- Tribe: Lamiini
- Genus: Cereopsius
- Species: C. whitei

Binomial name
- Cereopsius whitei Thomson, 1865

Species of beetle

Cereopsius whitei is a species of beetle in the family Cerambycidae. It was described by James Thomson in 1865. It is known from Malaysia and Indonesia.
