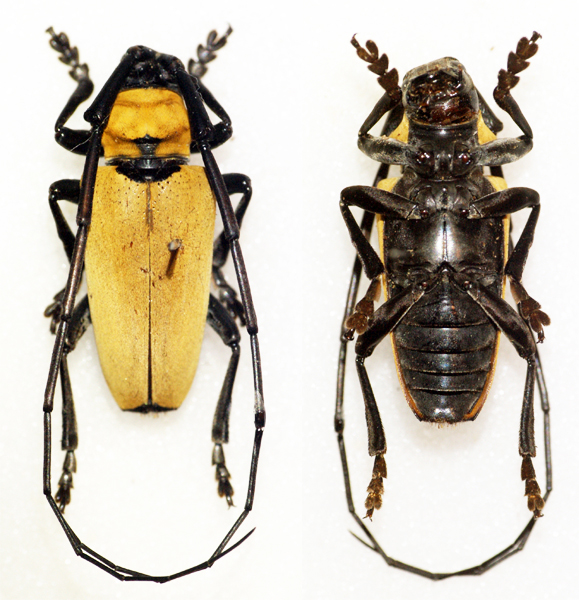

Scientific classification
- Kingdom: Animalia
- Phylum: Arthropoda
- Class: Insecta
- Order: Coleoptera
- Suborder: Polyphaga
- Infraorder: Cucujiformia
- Family: Cerambycidae
- Genus: Cereopsius
- Species: C. praetorius

Binomial name
- Cereopsius praetorius (Erichson, 1842)

Synonyms
- Lamia praetoria Erichson, 1842

= Cereopsius praetorius =

Species of beetle

Cereopsius praetorius is a species of beetle in the family Cerambycidae. It was described by Wilhelm Ferdinand Erichson in 1842, originally under the genus Lamia. It is known from the Philippines.

== Varieties ==
- Cereopsius praetorius var. elpenor Pascoe, 1862
- Cereopsius praetorius var. flavescens Breuning, 1944
- Cereopsius praetorius var. transitivus Breuning, 1944
