= Phyllalia alboradiata =

Scientific classification
- Kingdom: Animalia
- Phylum: Arthropoda
- Class: Insecta
- Order: Lepidoptera
- Family: Eupterotidae
- Genus: Phyllalia
- Species: P. alboradiata

Binomial name
- Phyllalia alboradiata Aurivillius, 1911

Synonyms
- Phyllalia acuta Strand, 1911

Species of moth

Phyllalia alboradiata is a moth in the family Eupterotidae. It was described by Per Olof Christopher Aurivillius in 1911. It is found in South Africa.
