= Cereopsius guttulatus =

Scientific classification
- Kingdom: Animalia
- Phylum: Arthropoda
- Class: Insecta
- Order: Coleoptera
- Suborder: Polyphaga
- Infraorder: Cucujiformia
- Family: Cerambycidae
- Genus: Cereopsius
- Species: C. guttulatus

Binomial name
- Cereopsius guttulatus Aurivillius, 1923

Synonyms
- Combe ornata Fisher, 1935

Species of beetle

Cereopsius guttulatus is a species of beetle in the family Cerambycidae. It was described by Per Olof Christopher Aurivillius in 1923 and is known from Borneo.
