= Cereopsius vittipennis =

Scientific classification
- Kingdom: Animalia
- Phylum: Arthropoda
- Class: Insecta
- Order: Coleoptera
- Suborder: Polyphaga
- Infraorder: Cucujiformia
- Family: Cerambycidae
- Genus: Cereopsius
- Species: C. vittipennis

Binomial name
- Cereopsius vittipennis (Fisher, 1935)

Synonyms
- Epepeotes vittipennis Fisher, 1935; Vitticereopsius vittipennis (Fisher) Breuning, 1961

Species of beetle

Cereopsius vittipennis is a species of beetle in the family Cerambycidae. It was described by Warren Samuel Fisher based on specimen(s) from Mount Kinabalu in 1935, originally under the genus Epepeotes. It is known from Borneo.
