= Lasiocercis bigibba =

Scientific classification
- Kingdom: Animalia
- Phylum: Arthropoda
- Class: Insecta
- Order: Coleoptera
- Suborder: Polyphaga
- Infraorder: Cucujiformia
- Family: Cerambycidae
- Tribe: Crossotini
- Genus: Lasiocercis
- Species: L. bigibba

Binomial name
- Lasiocercis bigibba (Fairmaire, 1896)

Species of beetle

Lasiocercis bigibba is a species of beetle in the family Cerambycidae. It was described by Fairmaire in 1896.
