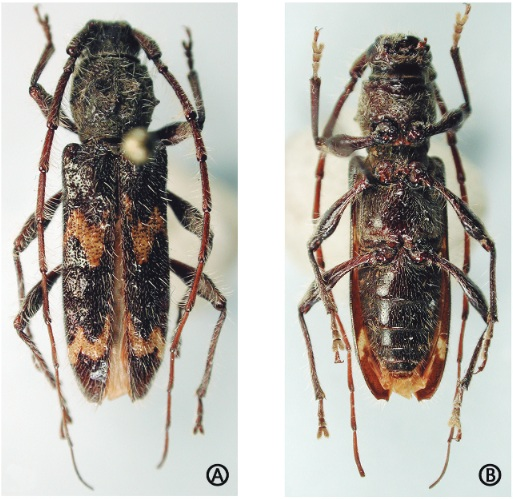
- Male
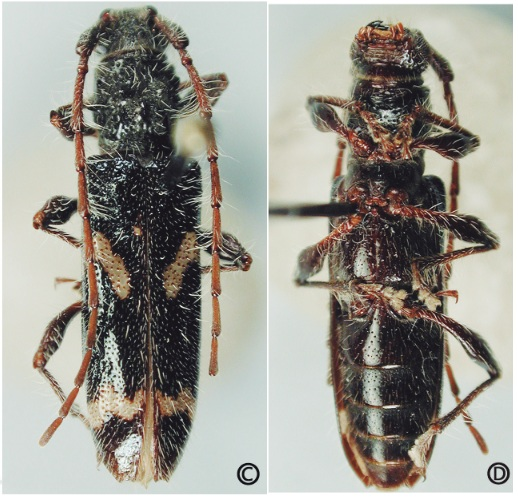
- Female

Scientific classification
- Kingdom: Animalia
- Phylum: Arthropoda
- Clade: Pancrustacea
- Class: Insecta
- Order: Coleoptera
- Suborder: Polyphaga
- Infraorder: Cucujiformia
- Family: Cerambycidae
- Genus: Eligmoderma
- Species: E. monnei

Binomial name
- Eligmoderma monnei Bezark & Santos-Silva, 2026

= Eligmoderma monnei =

Species of beetle

Eligmoderma monnei is a species of beetle of the family Cerambycidae. It is found in Venezuela (Aragua).

== Description ==
Adults reach a length of about 13.2–20.3 mm (0.52–0.80 in). The integument is mostly dark reddish brown. The head and pronotum are slightly darker, almost blackish and the antennae are more light reddish brown. The elytra have two areas of transverse yellowish maculae.

== Etymology ==
The species is named in honour of Miguel A. Monné, for his long-term contributions to the cerambycid fauna of the New World.
