= Lasiocercis nigrofasciata =

Scientific classification
- Kingdom: Animalia
- Phylum: Arthropoda
- Class: Insecta
- Order: Coleoptera
- Suborder: Polyphaga
- Infraorder: Cucujiformia
- Family: Cerambycidae
- Tribe: Crossotini
- Genus: Lasiocercis
- Species: L. nigrofasciata

Binomial name
- Lasiocercis nigrofasciata Breuning, 1964

Species of beetle

Lasiocercis nigrofasciata is a species of beetle in the family Cerambycidae. It was described by Stephan von Breuning in 1964.
