= Cereopsius javanicus =

Scientific classification
- Kingdom: Animalia
- Phylum: Arthropoda
- Clade: Pancrustacea
- Class: Insecta
- Order: Coleoptera
- Suborder: Polyphaga
- Infraorder: Cucujiformia
- Family: Cerambycidae
- Genus: Cereopsius
- Species: C. javanicus

Binomial name
- Cereopsius javanicus Breuning, 1936

Synonyms
- Cereopsius ornatus Fisher, 1936

Species of beetle

Cereopsius javanicus is a species of beetle in the family Cerambycidae. It was described by Stephan von Breuning in 1936. It is known from Borneo and Java.
