= Lasiocercis truncata =

Scientific classification
- Kingdom: Animalia
- Phylum: Arthropoda
- Class: Insecta
- Order: Coleoptera
- Suborder: Polyphaga
- Infraorder: Cucujiformia
- Family: Cerambycidae
- Tribe: Crossotini
- Genus: Lasiocercis
- Species: L. truncata

Binomial name
- Lasiocercis truncata (Lepesme & Villiers, 1944)

Species of beetle

Lasiocercis truncata is a species of beetle in the family Cerambycidae. It was described by Lepesme and Villiers in 1944.
