= Acanthoibidion =

Scientific classification
- Domain: Eukaryota
- Kingdom: Animalia
- Phylum: Arthropoda
- Class: Insecta
- Order: Coleoptera
- Suborder: Polyphaga
- Infraorder: Cucujiformia
- Family: Cerambycidae
- Subfamily: Cerambycinae
- Tribe: Eligmodermini
- Genus: Acanthoibidion; Lane, 1959
- Species: A. chevrolatii

Binomial name
- Acanthoibidion chevrolatii (White, 1855)

Species of beetle

Acanthoibidion is a genus of beetle in the family Cerambycidae. The only species in the genus is Acanthoibidion chevrolatii. It was described by White in 1855.
