= Phyllalia flavicostata =

Scientific classification
- Kingdom: Animalia
- Phylum: Arthropoda
- Class: Insecta
- Order: Lepidoptera
- Family: Eupterotidae
- Genus: Phyllalia
- Species: P. flavicostata

Binomial name
- Phyllalia flavicostata Fawcett, 1903

Species of moth

Phyllalia flavicostata is a moth in the family Eupterotidae. It was described by James Farish Malcolm Fawcett in 1903. It is found in South Africa.

The wings are a pale cream colour, with a fulvous fascia on the costa, clothed with thick fulvous hairs, broad at the base, narrowing to a point at the apex. There is a thin marginal fulvous line.

The larvae feed on Ehrharta calycina. They have a velvety black body, with subdorsal, lateral, and spiracular greyish-white tubercles, bearing tufts of thick fulvous hairs of moderate length with a few longer hairs among them. The head is red.
