= Phyllalia thunbergii =

Scientific classification
- Kingdom: Animalia
- Phylum: Arthropoda
- Class: Insecta
- Order: Lepidoptera
- Family: Eupterotidae
- Genus: Phyllalia
- Species: P. thunbergii

Binomial name
- Phyllalia thunbergii (Boisduval, 1847)

Synonyms
- Bombyx thunbergii Boisduval, 1847; Dreata incerta Walker, 1855

Species of moth

Phyllalia thunbergii is a moth in the family Eupterotidae. It was described by Jean Baptiste Boisduval in 1847. It is found in KwaZulu-Natal in South Africa.
