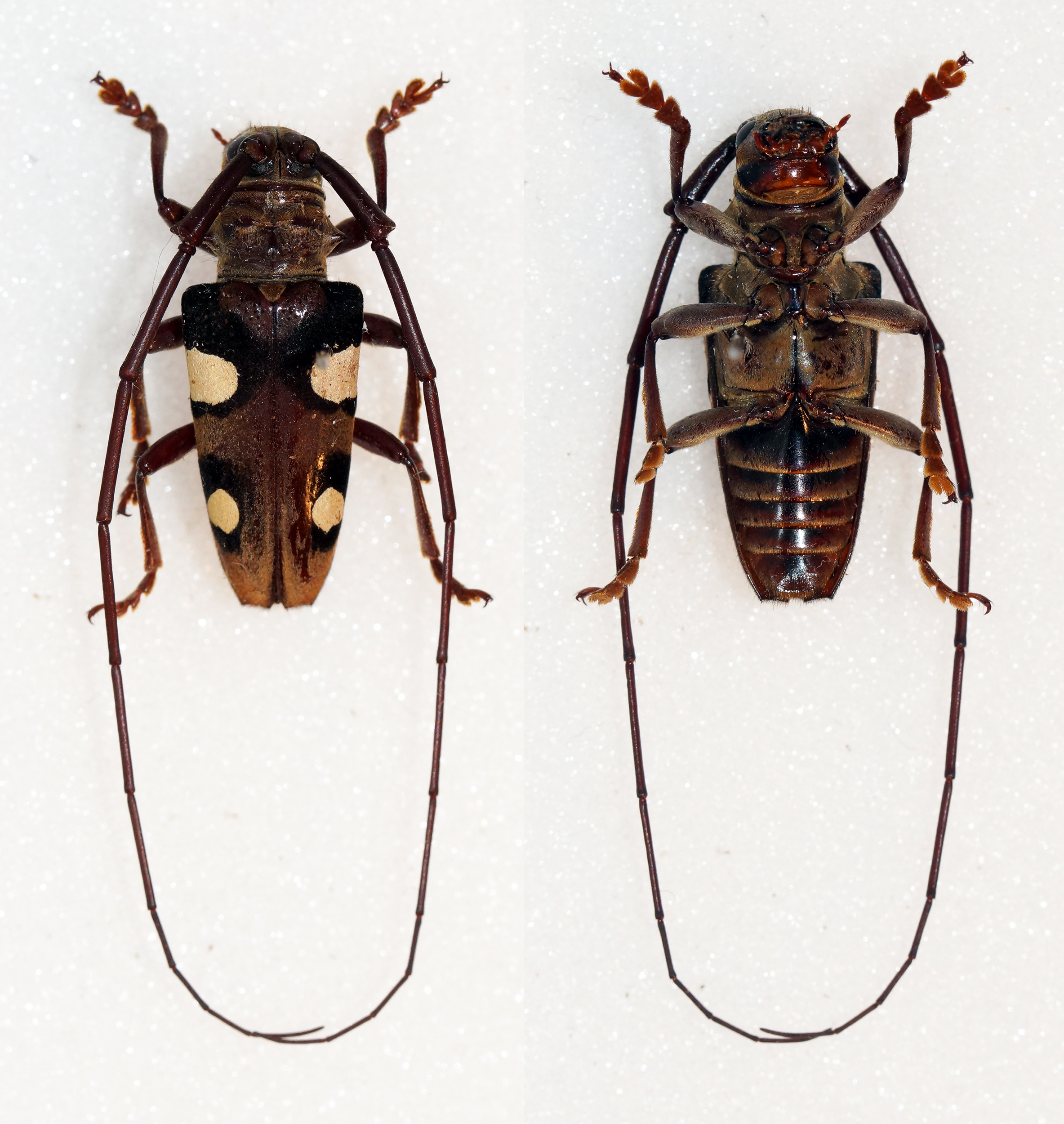

Scientific classification
- Kingdom: Animalia
- Phylum: Arthropoda
- Class: Insecta
- Order: Coleoptera
- Suborder: Polyphaga
- Infraorder: Cucujiformia
- Family: Cerambycidae
- Genus: Cereopsius
- Species: C. helena

Binomial name
- Cereopsius helena White, 1858

Synonyms
- Etymestia helena (White, 1858)

= Cereopsius helena =

Species of beetle

Cereopsius helena is a species of beetle in the family Cerambycidae. It was described by White in 1858. It is known from Borneo and Malaysia.
