= Cereopsius copei =

Scientific classification
- Domain: Eukaryota
- Kingdom: Animalia
- Phylum: Arthropoda
- Class: Insecta
- Order: Coleoptera
- Suborder: Polyphaga
- Infraorder: Cucujiformia
- Family: Cerambycidae
- Tribe: Lamiini
- Genus: Cereopsius
- Species: C. copei

Binomial name
- Cereopsius copei Hüdepohl, 1993

Species of beetle

Cereopsius copei is a species of beetle in the family Cerambycidae. It was described by Karl-Ernst Hüdepohl in 1993. It is known from the Philippines.
