= Cereopsius niassensis =

Scientific classification
- Domain: Eukaryota
- Kingdom: Animalia
- Phylum: Arthropoda
- Class: Insecta
- Order: Coleoptera
- Suborder: Polyphaga
- Infraorder: Cucujiformia
- Family: Cerambycidae
- Tribe: Lamiini
- Genus: Cereopsius
- Species: C. niassensis

Binomial name
- Cereopsius niassensis Lansberge, 1883

Species of beetle

Cereopsius niassensis is a species of beetle in the family Cerambycidae. It was described by Lansberge in 1883.
