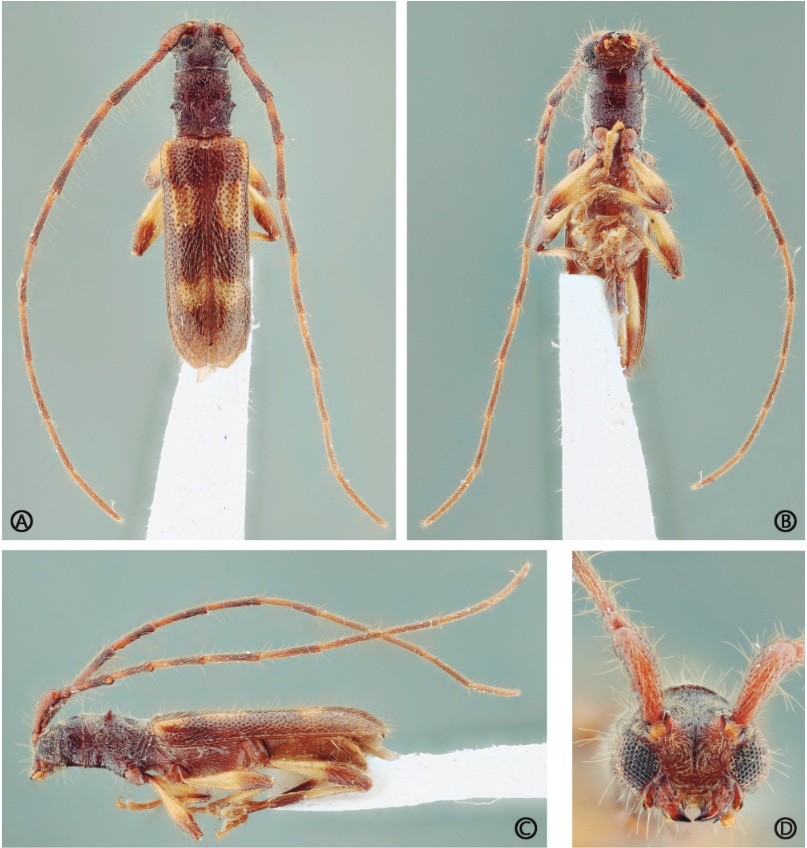

Scientific classification
- Kingdom: Animalia
- Phylum: Arthropoda
- Clade: Pancrustacea
- Class: Insecta
- Order: Coleoptera
- Suborder: Polyphaga
- Infraorder: Cucujiformia
- Family: Cerambycidae
- Genus: Eligmoderma
- Species: E. minutum

Binomial name
- Eligmoderma minutum Martins & Galileo, 2009

Synonyms
- Eligmoderma minuta

= Eligmoderma minutum =

Species of beetle

Eligmoderma minutum is a species of beetle in the family Cerambycidae. It was described by Martins and Galileo in 2009. It is found in Venezuela (Táchir) and Trinidad and Tobago (Trinidad).
