= Phyllalia =

Scientific classification
- Kingdom: Animalia
- Phylum: Arthropoda
- Class: Insecta
- Order: Lepidoptera
- Family: Eupterotidae
- Subfamily: Eupterotinae
- Genus: Phyllalia; Walker, 1855

Synonyms
- Homochroa Wallengren, 1858 (preocc.)

Genus of moths

Phyllalia is a genus of moths in the family Eupterotidae.

== Species ==
- Phyllalia alboradiata Aurivillius, 1911
- Phyllalia flavicostata Fawcett, 1903
- Phyllalia patens Boisduval, 1847
- Phyllalia thunbergii Boisduval, 1847
- Phyllalia umbripennis Strand, 1911
- Phyllalia valida Felder, 1874
- Phyllalia ziczac Strand, 1911

== Former species ==
- Phyllalia acuta Strand, 1911
