= Phyllalia valida =

Scientific classification
- Kingdom: Animalia
- Phylum: Arthropoda
- Class: Insecta
- Order: Lepidoptera
- Family: Eupterotidae
- Genus: Phyllalia
- Species: P. valida

Binomial name
- Phyllalia valida Felder, 1874

Species of moth

Phyllalia valida is a moth in the family Eupterotidae. It was described by Felder in 1874. It is found in South Africa.
