= Eligmodermini =

Scientific classification
- Kingdom: Animalia
- Phylum: Arthropoda
- Clade: Pancrustacea
- Class: Insecta
- Order: Coleoptera
- Suborder: Polyphaga
- Infraorder: Cucujiformia
- Family: Cerambycidae
- Subfamily: Cerambycinae
- Tribe: Eligmodermini; Lacordaire, 1868

Tribe of beetles

Eligmodermini is a tribe of beetles in the subfamily Cerambycinae, containing the following genera and species:

- Genus Acanthoibidion Lane, 1959
  - Acanthoibidion chevrolatii (White, 1855)
- Genus Eligmoderma Thomson, 1864
  - Eligmoderma aragua Martins & Galileo, 2009
  - Eligmoderma ibidionoides Thomson, 1864
  - Eligmoderma lara Galileo & Martins, 2012
  - Eligmoderma minutum Martins & Galileo, 2009
  - Eligmoderma monnei Bezark & Santos-Silva, 2026
  - Eligmoderma politum Nonfried, 1895
  - Eligmoderma spinicolle Aurivillius, 1924
  - Eligmoderma trifasciatum Aurivillius, 1923
  - Eligmoderma ziczac Nonfried, 1895
- Genus Hosticus Galileo, Rosa & Santos-Silva, 2020 (=Alienus Galileo & Martins, 2010)
  - Hosticus curiosus (Galileo & Martins, 2010)
- Genus Limozota Pascoe, 1866
  - Limozota virgata Pascoe, 1866
- Genus Tucanti Martins & Galileo, 2009
  - Tucanti plumicornis Martins & Galileo, 2009

== Selected former species ==
- Eligmoderma convexicolle Aurivillius, 1923
