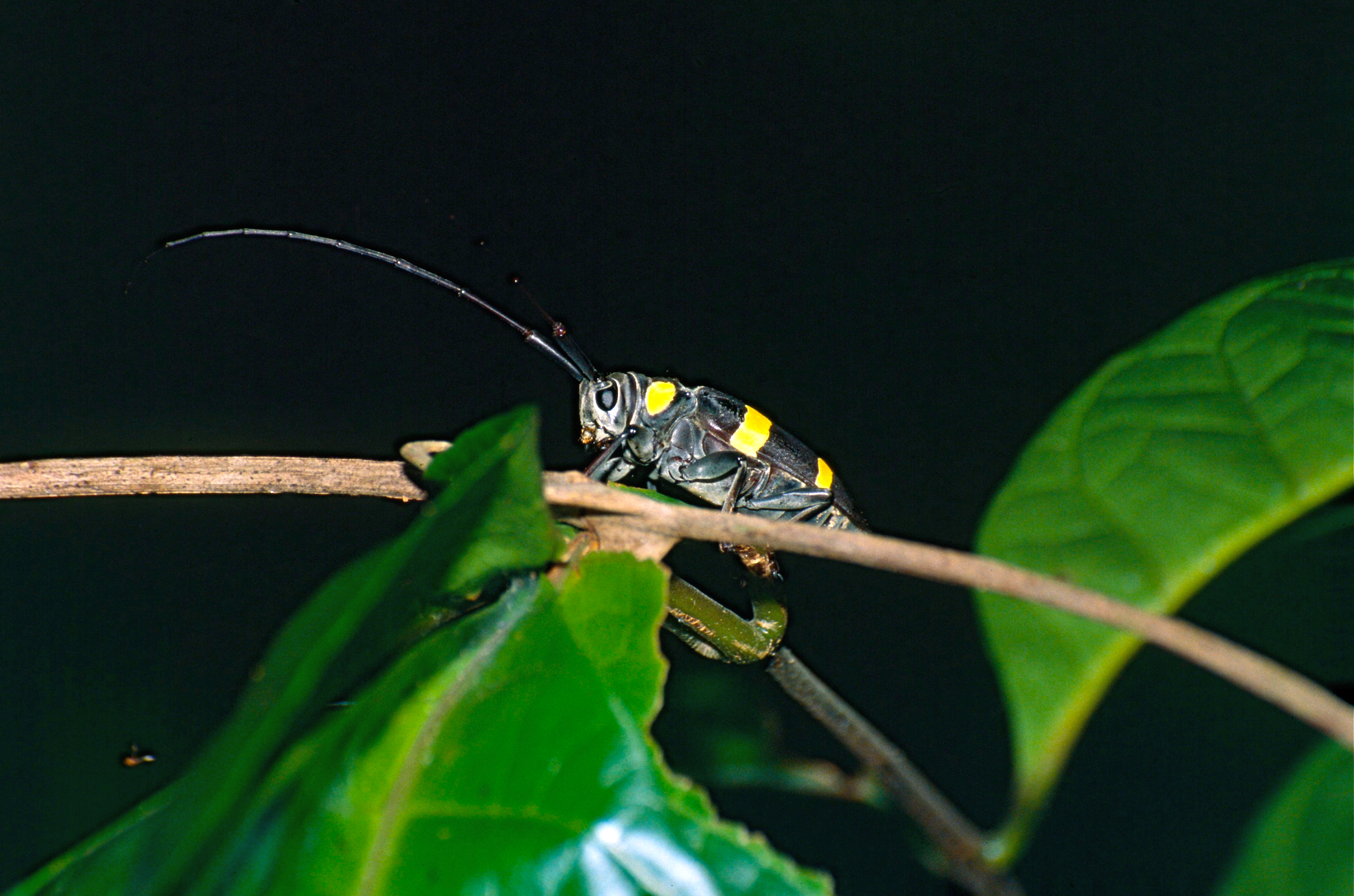

Scientific classification
- Kingdom: Animalia
- Phylum: Arthropoda
- Clade: Pancrustacea
- Class: Insecta
- Order: Coleoptera
- Suborder: Polyphaga
- Infraorder: Cucujiformia
- Family: Cerambycidae
- Genus: Cereopsius
- Species: C. elongatus

Binomial name
- Cereopsius elongatus Breuning & de Jong, 1941

Synonyms
- Cereopsius reductemaculatus Breuning, 1959

= Cereopsius elongatus =

Species of beetle

Cereopsius elongatus is a species of beetle in the family Cerambycidae. It was described by Stephan von Breuning and de Jong in 1941. It is known from Sumatra and Java.
