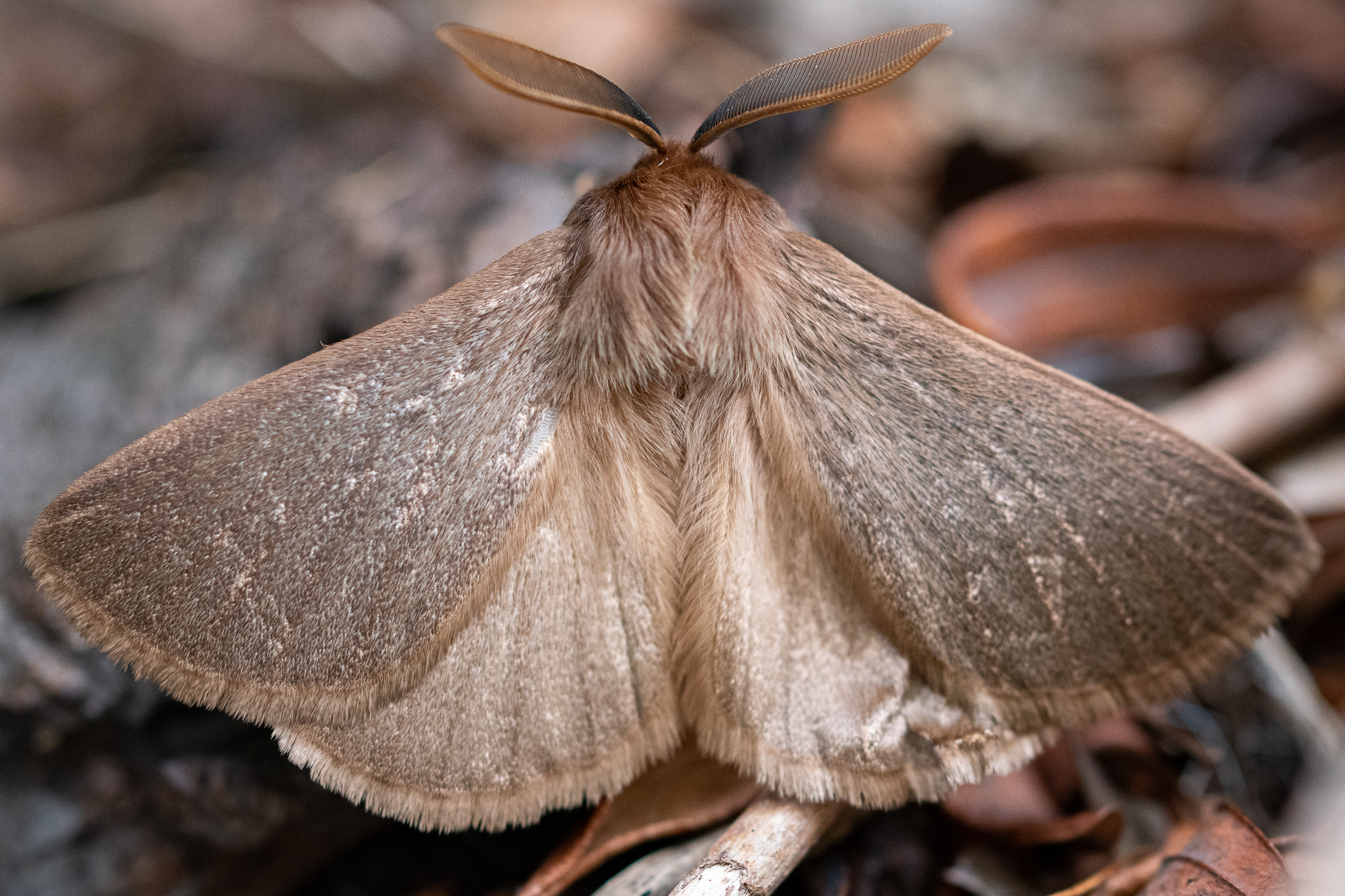

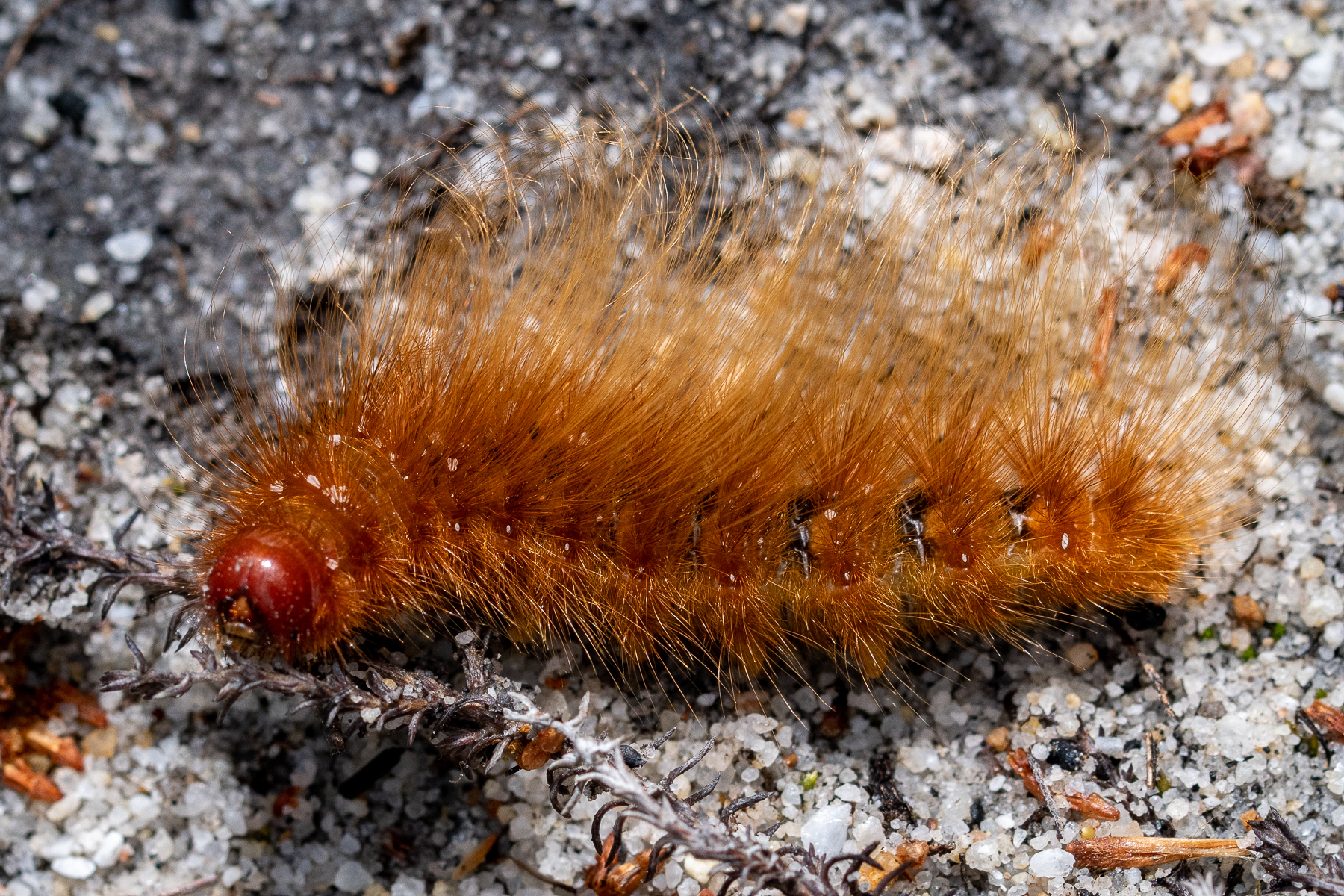
- Adult (top), Larva (bottom)

Scientific classification
- Kingdom: Animalia
- Phylum: Arthropoda
- Class: Insecta
- Order: Lepidoptera
- Family: Eupterotidae
- Genus: Phyllalia
- Species: P. patens

Binomial name
- Phyllalia patens (Boisduval, 1847)

Synonyms
- Bombyx patens Boisduval, 1847; Dreata concolor Walker, 1855

= Phyllalia patens =

Species of moth

Phyllalia patens is a species of moth in the family Eupterotidae. It was described by Jean Baptiste Boisduval in 1847. It is found in Lesotho and KwaZulu-Natal and Mpumalanga in South Africa.

Adults are fawn coloured, with the abdomen and hindwings hardly paler than the forewings. All wings are very broad and rather short.

The larvae feed on Cynodon dactylon and Ehrharta calycina. They construct a sort of grotto on the ground under the leaves of the host plant, in which it remains concealed during the heat of the day, emerging and feeding in the cool of the evening. The larvae a velvety black body above, while it is pale fulvous underneath. The head is bright red.
