= Cereopsius shamankariyali =

Scientific classification
- Domain: Eukaryota
- Kingdom: Animalia
- Phylum: Arthropoda
- Class: Insecta
- Order: Coleoptera
- Suborder: Polyphaga
- Infraorder: Cucujiformia
- Family: Cerambycidae
- Tribe: Lamiini
- Genus: Cereopsius
- Species: C. shamankariyali

Binomial name
- Cereopsius shamankariyali Kano, 1939

Species of beetle

Cereopsius shamankariyali is a species of beetle in the family Cerambycidae. It was described by Kano in 1939. It is known from Taiwan.
