= Cereopsius spilotus =

Scientific classification
- Kingdom: Animalia
- Phylum: Arthropoda
- Class: Insecta
- Order: Coleoptera
- Suborder: Polyphaga
- Infraorder: Cucujiformia
- Family: Cerambycidae
- Genus: Cereopsius
- Species: C. spilotus

Binomial name
- Cereopsius spilotus Pascoe, 1885

Synonyms
- Cereopsius octomaculatus Aurivillius, 1923

Species of beetle

Cereopsius spilotus is a species of beetle in the family Cerambycidae. It was described by Francis Polkinghorne Pascoe in 1885. It is known from Borneo.
