= Cereopsius sexnotatus =

Scientific classification
- Kingdom: Animalia
- Phylum: Arthropoda
- Clade: Pancrustacea
- Class: Insecta
- Order: Coleoptera
- Suborder: Polyphaga
- Infraorder: Cucujiformia
- Family: Cerambycidae
- Genus: Cereopsius
- Species: C. sexnotatus

Binomial name
- Cereopsius sexnotatus J. Thomson, 1865

Synonyms
- Cereopsius niasicus Breuning, 1952

Species of beetle

Cereopsius sexnotatus is a species of beetle in the family Cerambycidae. It was described by James Thomson in 1865. It is known from Malaysia and Java.

== Varietas ==
- Cereopsius sexnotatus var. octonotatus Breuning, 1944
- Cereopsius sexnotatus var. quadriplagiatus Breuning, 1944
