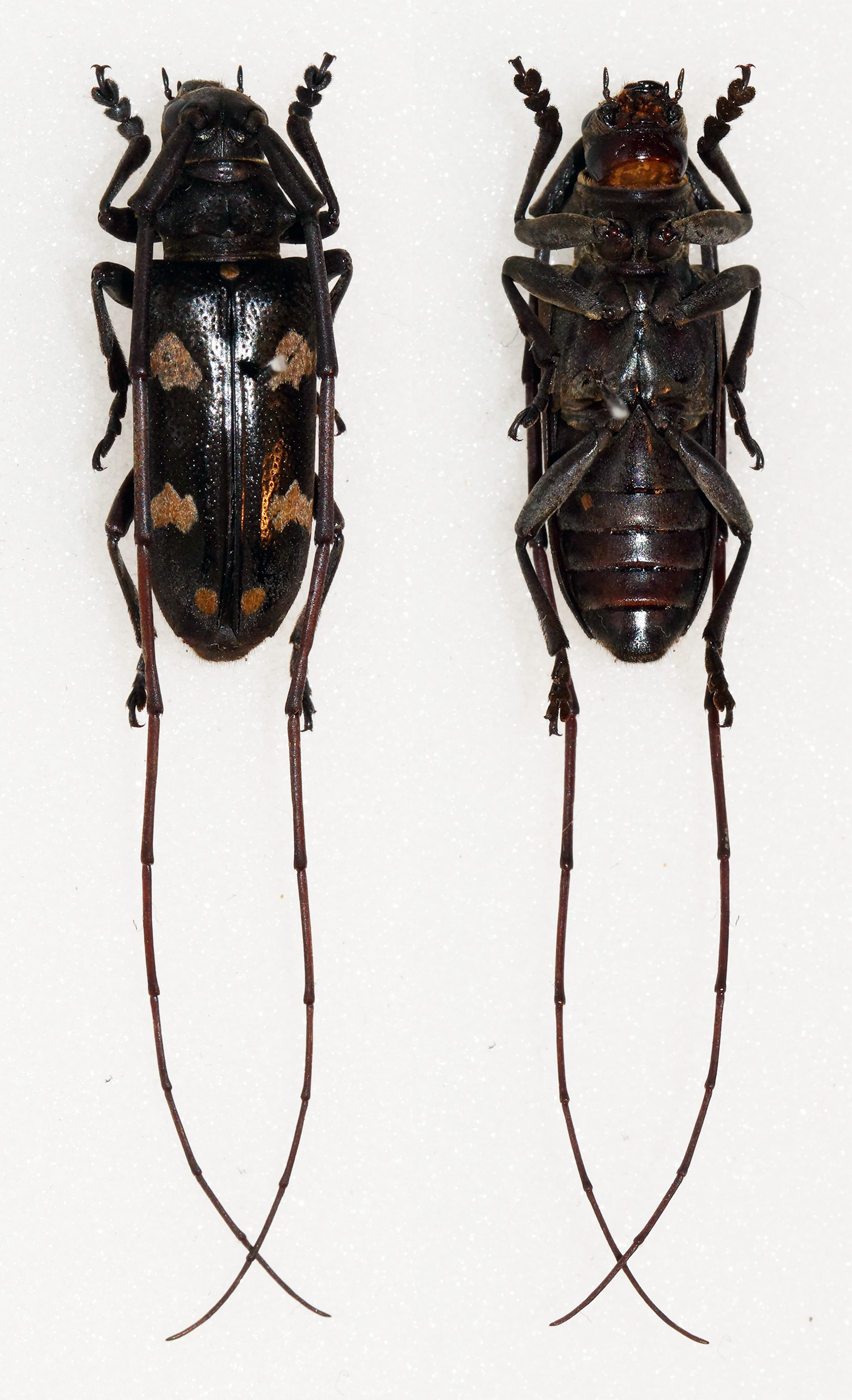

Scientific classification
- Kingdom: Animalia
- Phylum: Arthropoda
- Class: Insecta
- Order: Coleoptera
- Suborder: Polyphaga
- Infraorder: Cucujiformia
- Family: Cerambycidae
- Genus: Cereopsius
- Species: C. aureomaculatus

Binomial name
- Cereopsius aureomaculatus Breuning, 1968

= Cereopsius aureomaculatus =

Species of beetle

Cereopsius aureomaculatus is a species of beetle in the family Cerambycidae. It was described by Stephan von Breuning in 1968. It is known from Laos.
