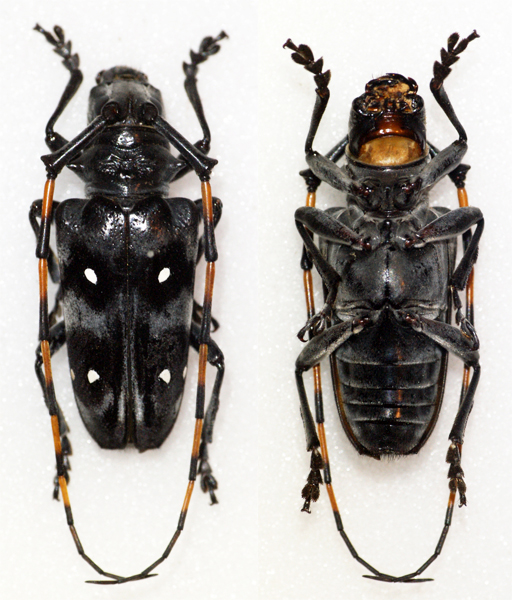

Scientific classification
- Kingdom: Animalia
- Phylum: Arthropoda
- Class: Insecta
- Order: Coleoptera
- Suborder: Polyphaga
- Infraorder: Cucujiformia
- Family: Cerambycidae
- Genus: Cereopsius
- Species: C. alboguttatus

Binomial name
- Cereopsius alboguttatus (C. Waterhouse, 1878)

Synonyms
- Etymestia alboguttata C. Waterhouse, 1878

= Cereopsius alboguttatus =

Species of beetle

Cereopsius alboguttatus is a species of beetle in the family Cerambycidae. It was described by C. Waterhouse in 1878. It is known from Borneo.
