= Cereopsius nigrofasciatus =

Scientific classification
- Kingdom: Animalia
- Phylum: Arthropoda
- Class: Insecta
- Order: Coleoptera
- Suborder: Polyphaga
- Infraorder: Cucujiformia
- Family: Cerambycidae
- Genus: Cereopsius
- Species: C. nigrofasciatus

Binomial name
- Cereopsius nigrofasciatus Aurivillius, 1913

Species of beetle

Cereopsius nigrofasciatus is a species of beetle in the family Cerambycidae. It was described by Per Olof Christopher Aurivillius in 1913. It is known from Borneo.
