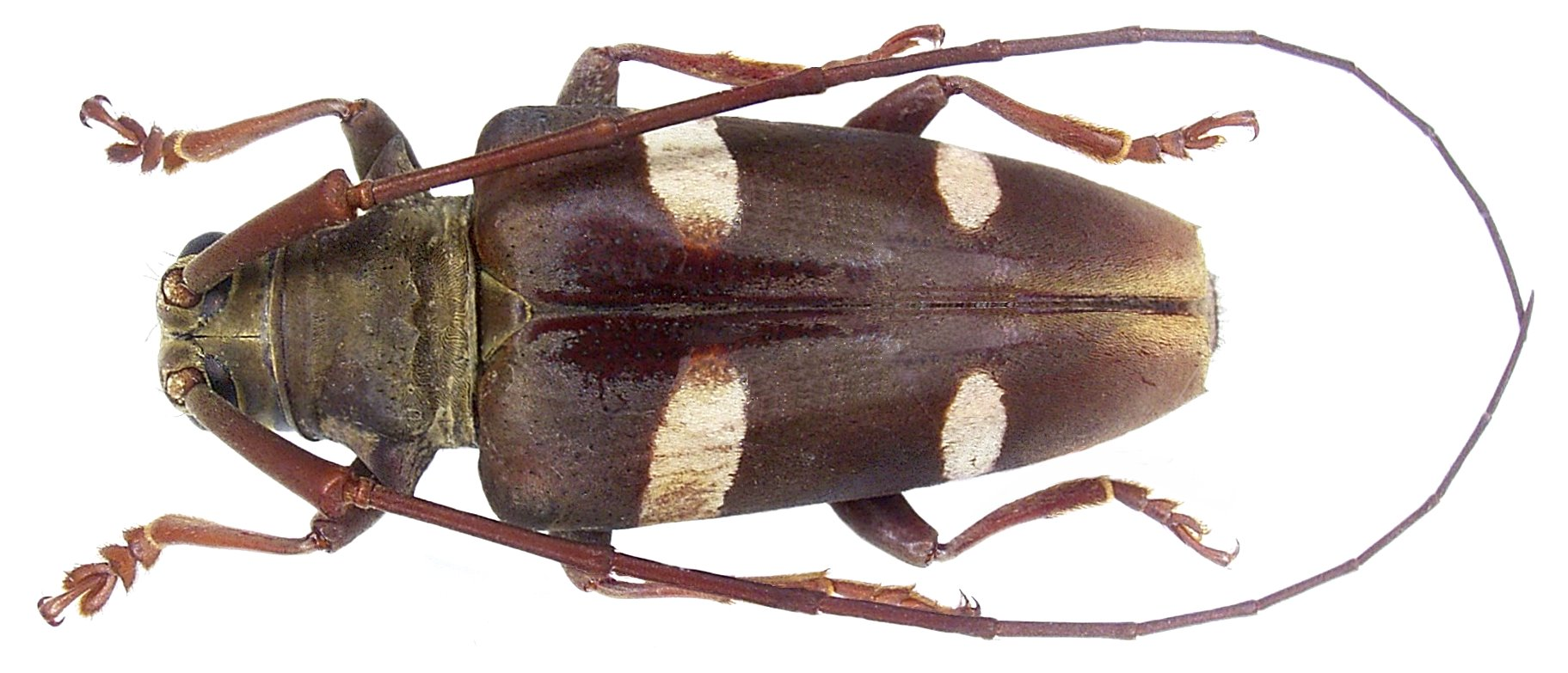

Scientific classification
- Kingdom: Animalia
- Phylum: Arthropoda
- Clade: Pancrustacea
- Class: Insecta
- Order: Coleoptera
- Suborder: Polyphaga
- Infraorder: Cucujiformia
- Family: Cerambycidae
- Genus: Cereopsius
- Species: C. sexmaculatus

Binomial name
- Cereopsius sexmaculatus Aurivillius, 1907

Synonyms
- Cereopsius sexmaculatus immaculithorax Breuning, 1974

= Cereopsius sexmaculatus =

Species of beetle

Cereopsius sexmaculatus is a species of beetle in the family Cerambycidae. It was described by Per Olof Christopher Aurivillius in 1907. It is known from the Philippines, Malaysia, Borneo and Sumatra.
