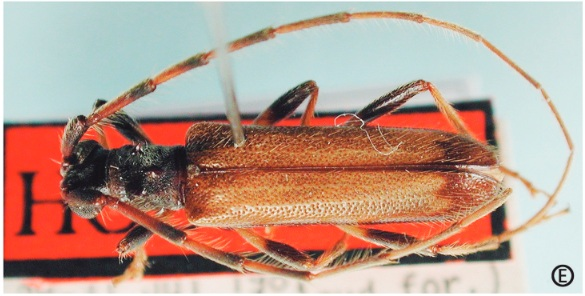

Scientific classification
- Kingdom: Animalia
- Phylum: Arthropoda
- Clade: Pancrustacea
- Class: Insecta
- Order: Coleoptera
- Suborder: Polyphaga
- Infraorder: Cucujiformia
- Family: Cerambycidae
- Genus: Eligmoderma
- Species: E. lara

Binomial name
- Eligmoderma lara Galileo & Martins, 2012

= Eligmoderma lara =

Species of beetle

Eligmoderma lara is a species of beetle of the family Cerambycidae. It is found in Venezuela (Lara).
