= Tucanti =

Scientific classification
- Kingdom: Animalia
- Phylum: Arthropoda
- Class: Insecta
- Order: Coleoptera
- Suborder: Polyphaga
- Infraorder: Cucujiformia
- Family: Cerambycidae
- Subfamily: Cerambycinae
- Tribe: Eligmodermini
- Genus: Tucanti; Martins & Galileo, 2009
- Species: T. plumicornis

Binomial name
- Tucanti plumicornis Martins & Galileo, 2009

Species of beetle

Tucanti plumicornis is a species of beetle in the family Cerambycidae, and the only species in the genus Tucanti. It was described by Martins and Galileo in 2009.
