= Lasiocercis pilosa =

Scientific classification
- Kingdom: Animalia
- Phylum: Arthropoda
- Class: Insecta
- Order: Coleoptera
- Suborder: Polyphaga
- Infraorder: Cucujiformia
- Family: Cerambycidae
- Tribe: Crossotini
- Genus: Lasiocercis
- Species: L. pilosa

Binomial name
- Lasiocercis pilosa Breuning, 1957

Species of beetle

Lasiocercis pilosa is a species of beetle in the family Cerambycidae. It was described by Stephan von Breuning in 1957.
