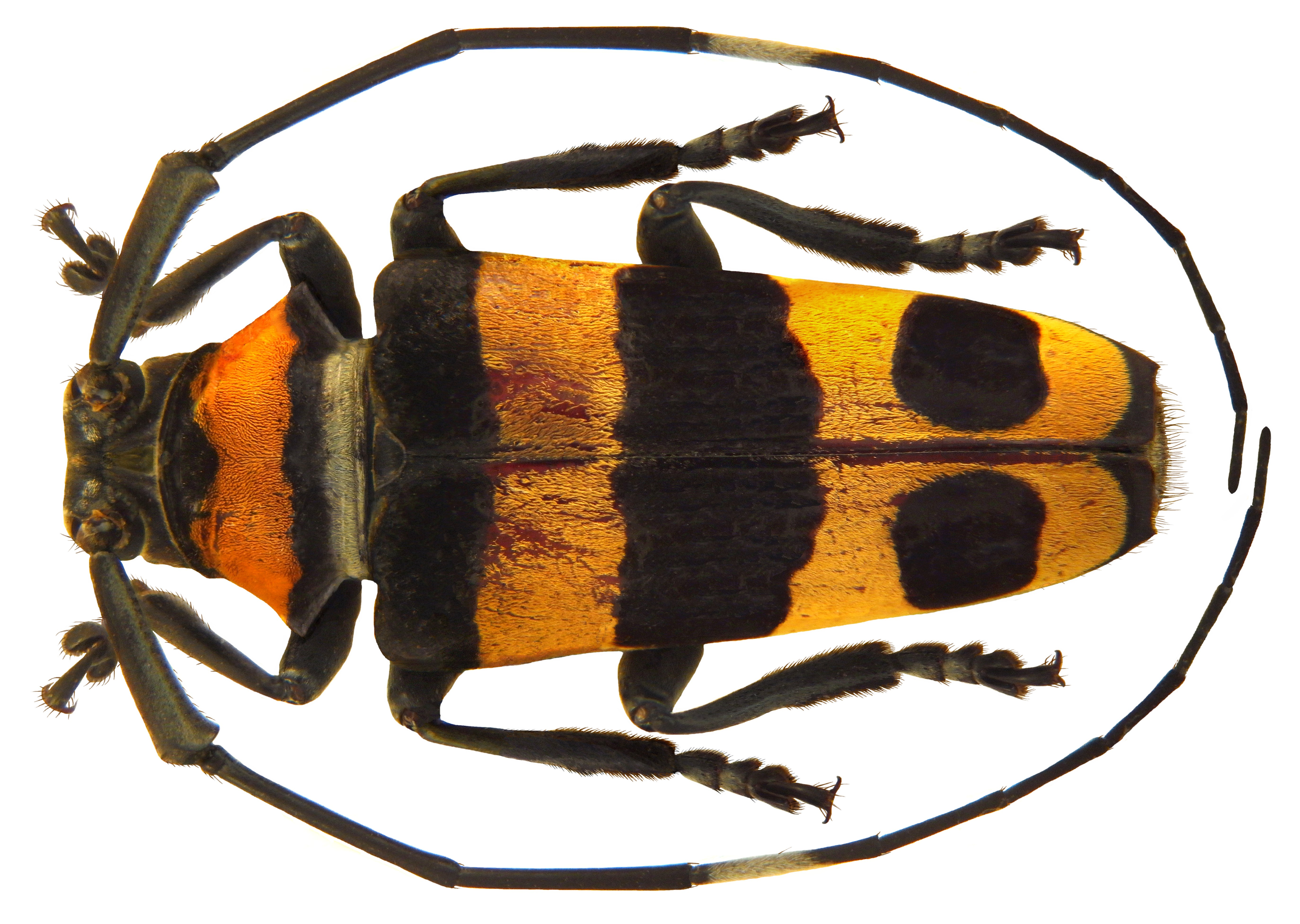
- Cereopsius quaestor

Scientific classification
- Domain: Eukaryota
- Kingdom: Animalia
- Phylum: Arthropoda
- Class: Insecta
- Order: Coleoptera
- Suborder: Polyphaga
- Infraorder: Cucujiformia
- Family: Cerambycidae
- Subfamily: Lamiinae
- Tribe: Lamiini
- Genus: Cereopsius; Pascoe, 1857

= Cereopsius =

Genus of beetles

Cereopsius is a genus of longhorn beetles of the subfamily Lamiinae, containing the following species:

- Cereopsius affinis Breuning, 1980
- Cereopsius alboguttatus (C. Waterhouse, 1878)
- Cereopsius amabilis Aurivillius, 1913
- Cereopsius arbiter Pascoe, 1885
- Cereopsius aureomaculatus Breuning, 1968
- Cereopsius cinereus Breuning, 1936
- Cereopsius copei Hüdepohl, 1993
- Cereopsius elongatus Breuning & de Jong, 1941
- Cereopsius erasmus Medina, Mantilla, Cabras & Vitali, 2021
- Cereopsius exoletus Pascoe, 1857
- Cereopsius guttulatus Aurivillius, 1923
- Cereopsius helena White, 1858
- Cereopsius javanicus Breuning, 1936
- Cereopsius kulzeri Breuning, 1936
- Cereopsius luctor (Newman, 1842)
- Cereopsius luhuanus Heller, 1896
- Cereopsius mimospilotus Breuning, 1980
- Cereopsius niassensis Lansberge, 1883
- Cereopsius nigrofasciatus Aurivillius, 1913
- Cereopsius obliquemaculatus Hüdepohl, 1989
- Cereopsius praetorius (Erichson, 1842)
- Cereopsius pulcherrimus Breuning, 1942
- Cereopsius quaestor (Newman, 1842)
- Cereopsius satelles Pascoe, 1885
- Cereopsius sexmaculatus Aurivillius, 1907
- Cereopsius sexnotatus J. Thomson, 1865
- Cereopsius shamankariyali Kano, 1939
- Cereopsius siamensis Breuning, 1936
- Cereopsius spilotoides Breuning, 1974
- Cereopsius spilotus Pascoe, 1885
- Cereopsius strandi Breuning, 1942
- Cereopsius vittipennis (Fisher, 1935)
- Cereopsius vivesi Breuning, 1978
- Cereopsius whitei Thomson, 1865
- Cereopsius ziczac (Matsushita, 1940)
