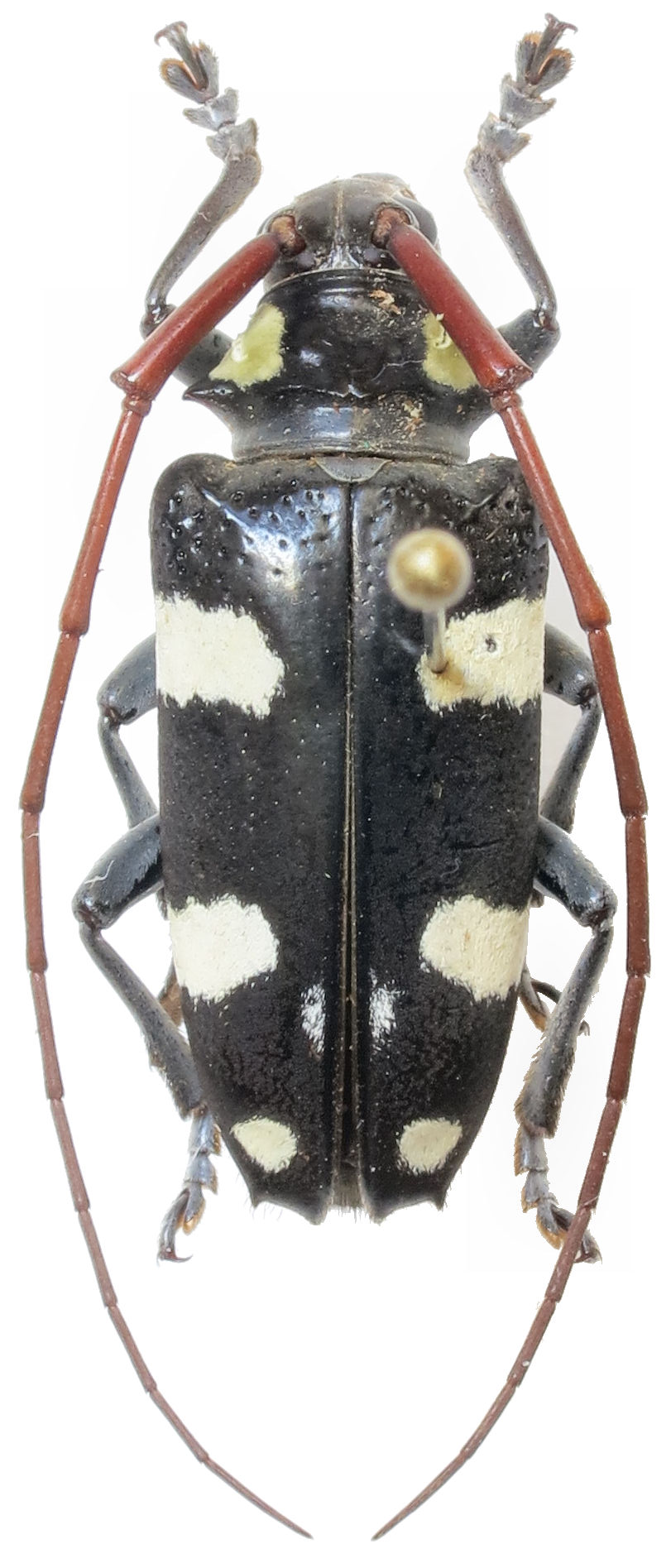
- Cereopsius luctor female from Philippines

Scientific classification
- Domain: Eukaryota
- Kingdom: Animalia
- Phylum: Arthropoda
- Class: Insecta
- Order: Coleoptera
- Suborder: Polyphaga
- Infraorder: Cucujiformia
- Family: Cerambycidae
- Tribe: Lamiini
- Genus: Cereopsius
- Species: C. luctor

Binomial name
- Cereopsius luctor (Newman, 1842)

Synonyms
- Monohammus? luctor Newman, 1842

= Cereopsius luctor =

Species of beetle

Cereopsius luctor is a species of beetle in the family Cerambycidae. It was described by Newman in 1842, originally under the genus Monohammus. It is known from the Philippines.
