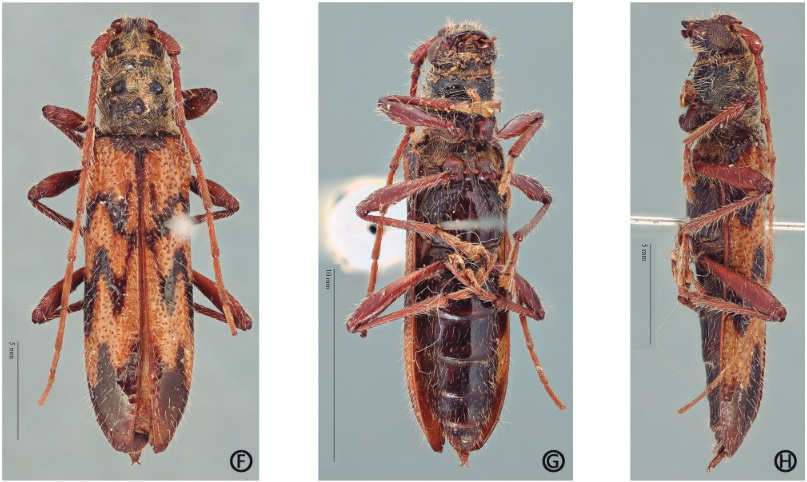

Scientific classification
- Kingdom: Animalia
- Phylum: Arthropoda
- Clade: Pancrustacea
- Class: Insecta
- Order: Coleoptera
- Suborder: Polyphaga
- Infraorder: Cucujiformia
- Family: Cerambycidae
- Genus: Eligmoderma
- Species: E. trifasciatum

Binomial name
- Eligmoderma trifasciatum Aurivillius, 1923

Synonyms
- Eligmoderma convexicolle Aurivillius, 1923

= Eligmoderma trifasciatum =

Species of beetle

Eligmoderma trifasciatum is a species of beetle in the family Cerambycidae. It was described by Per Olof Christopher Aurivillius in 1923. It is found in Venezuela.
