= Lasiocercis paraperroti =

Scientific classification
- Kingdom: Animalia
- Phylum: Arthropoda
- Class: Insecta
- Order: Coleoptera
- Suborder: Polyphaga
- Infraorder: Cucujiformia
- Family: Cerambycidae
- Tribe: Crossotini
- Genus: Lasiocercis
- Species: L. paraperroti

Binomial name
- Lasiocercis paraperroti Breuning, 1969

Species of beetle

Lasiocercis paraperroti is a species of beetle in the family Cerambycidae. It was described by Stephan von Breuning in 1969.
