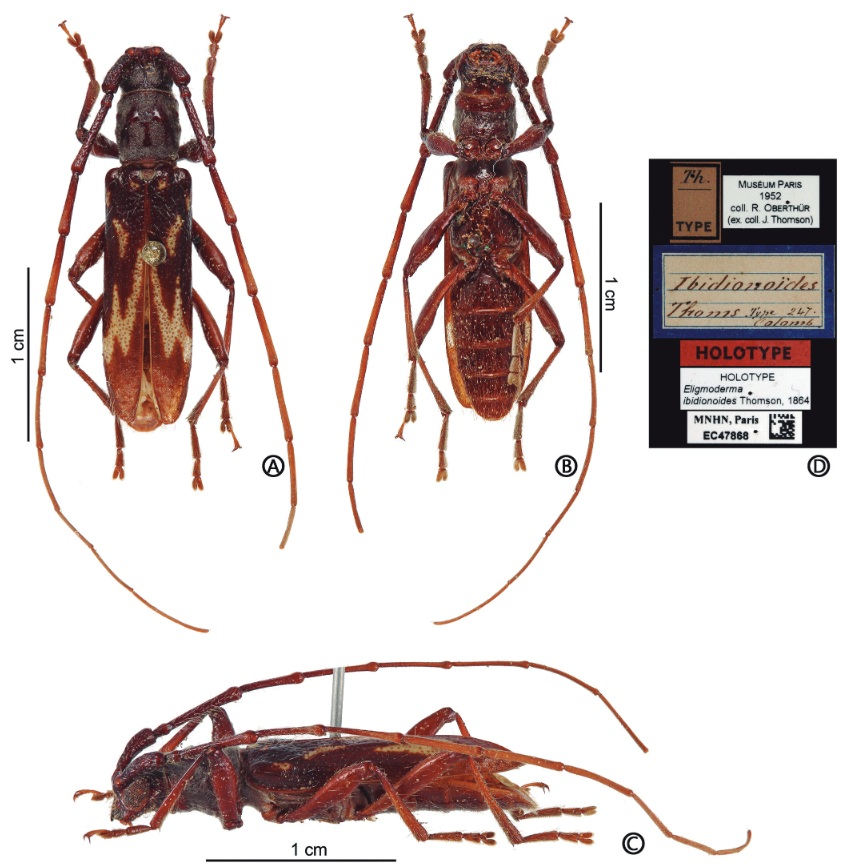

Scientific classification
- Kingdom: Animalia
- Phylum: Arthropoda
- Clade: Pancrustacea
- Class: Insecta
- Order: Coleoptera
- Suborder: Polyphaga
- Infraorder: Cucujiformia
- Family: Cerambycidae
- Genus: Eligmoderma
- Species: E. ibidionoides

Binomial name
- Eligmoderma ibidionoides Thomson, 1864

= Eligmoderma ibidionoides =

Species of beetle

Eligmoderma ibidionoides is a species of beetle in the family Cerambycidae. It was described by Thomson in 1864. It is found in Colombia.
