= Similosodus ziczac =

Scientific classification
- Kingdom: Animalia
- Phylum: Arthropoda
- Class: Insecta
- Order: Coleoptera
- Suborder: Polyphaga
- Infraorder: Cucujiformia
- Family: Cerambycidae
- Genus: Similosodus
- Species: S. ziczac

Binomial name
- Similosodus ziczac (McKeown, 1942)

Synonyms
- Similosodus (Transversesodus) ziczac McKeown, 1942; Similisodus ziczac McKeown, 1942

Species of beetle

Similosodus ziczac is a species of beetle in the family Cerambycidae. It was described by McKeown in 1942. It is known from Australia.
