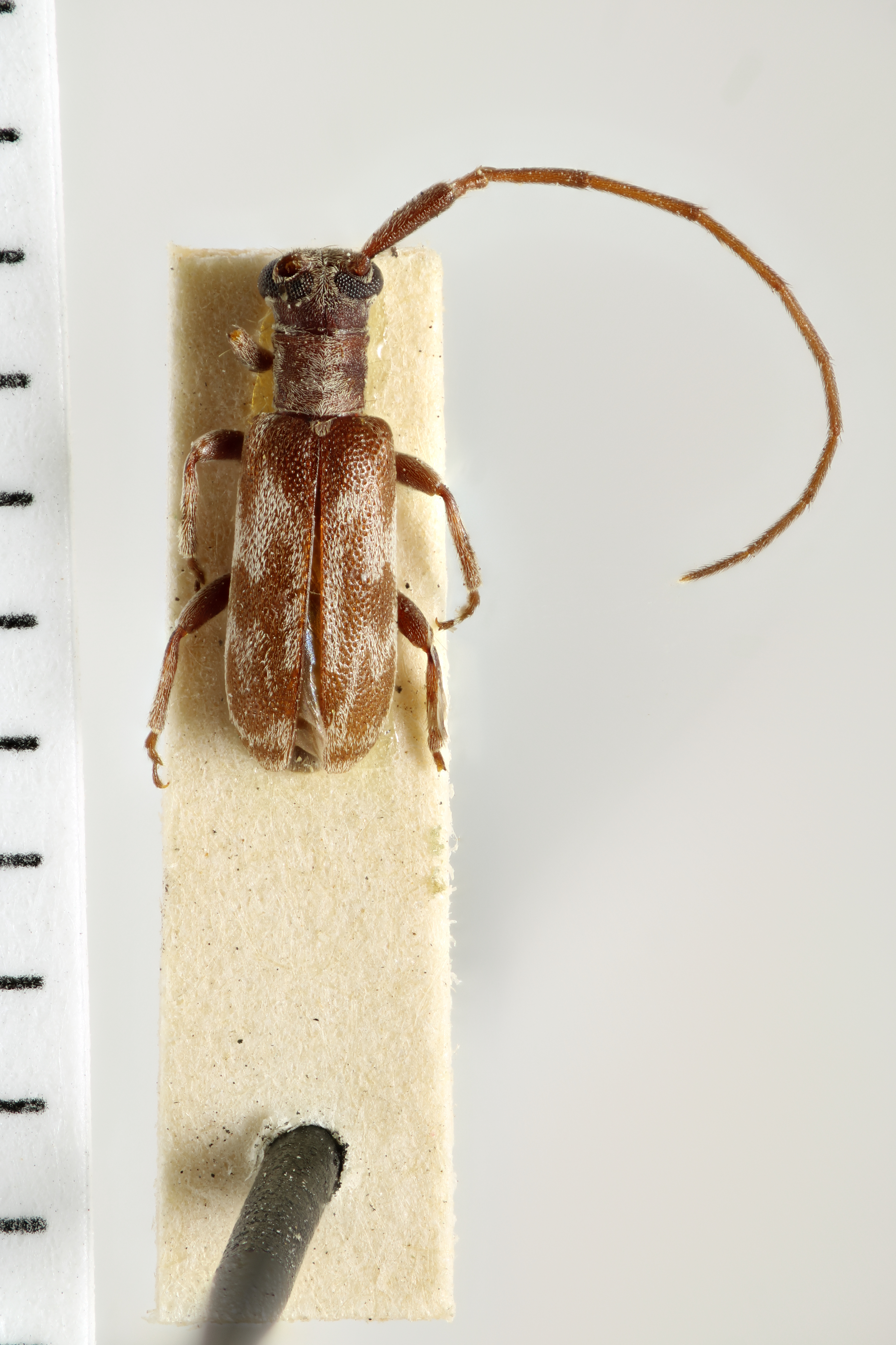

Scientific classification
- Kingdom: Animalia
- Phylum: Arthropoda
- Clade: Pancrustacea
- Class: Insecta
- Order: Coleoptera
- Suborder: Polyphaga
- Infraorder: Cucujiformia
- Family: Cerambycidae
- Genus: Eunidia
- Species: E. ziczac

Binomial name
- Eunidia ziczac Breuning, 1939

= Eunidia ziczac =

Species of beetle

Eunidia ziczac is a species of beetle in the family Cerambycidae. It was described by Stephan von Breuning in 1939. It is known from South Africa, Malawi, and Zimbabwe.

It's 4.5 mm long and 1 mm wide, and its type locality is "Natal". It is named for the zig-zag pattern on its elytron.
