= Phyllalia ziczac =

Scientific classification
- Kingdom: Animalia
- Phylum: Arthropoda
- Class: Insecta
- Order: Lepidoptera
- Family: Eupterotidae
- Genus: Phyllalia
- Species: P. ziczac

Binomial name
- Phyllalia ziczac Strand, 1911

Species of moth

Phyllalia ziczac is a moth in the family Eupterotidae. It was described by Strand in 1911. It is found in South Africa. Only one specimen has been recorded.
