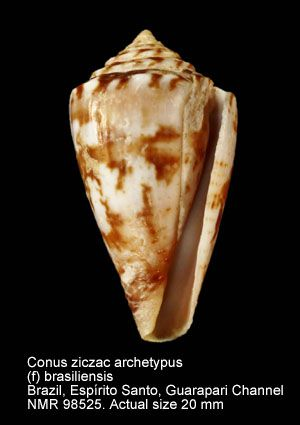

Scientific classification
- Domain: Eukaryota
- Kingdom: Animalia
- Phylum: Mollusca
- Class: Gastropoda
- Subclass: Caenogastropoda
- Order: Neogastropoda
- Superfamily: Conoidea
- Family: Conidae
- Genus: Conus
- Species: C. ziczac

Binomial name
- Conus ziczac Mühlfeld, 1816

Synonyms
- Conus (Dauciconus) ziczac Mühlfeld, 1816 · accepted, alternate representation; Conus beddomei G. B. Sowerby III, 1901; Conus ziczac ziczac Mühlfeld, 1816; Poremskiconus beddomei (G. B. Sowerby III, 1901); Poremskiconus ziczac (Mühlfeld, 1816); Poremskiconus ziczac ziczac (Mühlfeld, 1816); Purpuriconus ziczac (Mühlfeld, 1816)

= Conus ziczac =

Species of sea snail

Conus ziczac is a species of sea snail, a marine gastropod mollusk in the family Conidae, the cone snails and their allies.

Like all species within the genus Conus, these snails are predatory and venomous. They are capable of stinging humans, therefore live ones should be handled carefully or not at all.

Subspecies

- Conus ziczac archetypus Crosse, 1865 (synonyms: Conus archetypus Crosse, 1865; Conus bertarollae Costa & Simone, 1997; Conus brasiliensis Clench, 1942; Conus mauricioi Coltro, 2004)
- Conus ziczac ziczac Mühlfeld, 1816: synonym of Conus ziczac Mühlfeld, 1816

== Description ==
The size of the shell varies between 7 mm and 9 mm. The rather solid shell is light yellowish-brown, ornamented with large irregular white patches, which are mostly longitudinally oblong and here and there zigzag. The patches at the angle are smaller and arranged in a regular way. The growth lines form slightly waved longitudinal striae, crossed by very faint spiral ridges, which become stout and prominent towards the base. The spire is broadly conical, but little raised, and rather sharply angled. The whorls are slightly concave above the angle, separated by a well-defined impressed suture, sculptured with three rather deep spiral grooves, and crossed by numerous rather prominent oblique striae. Interior of the aperture is pink.

== Distribution ==
This marine species occurs off the Bahamas and off Florida
