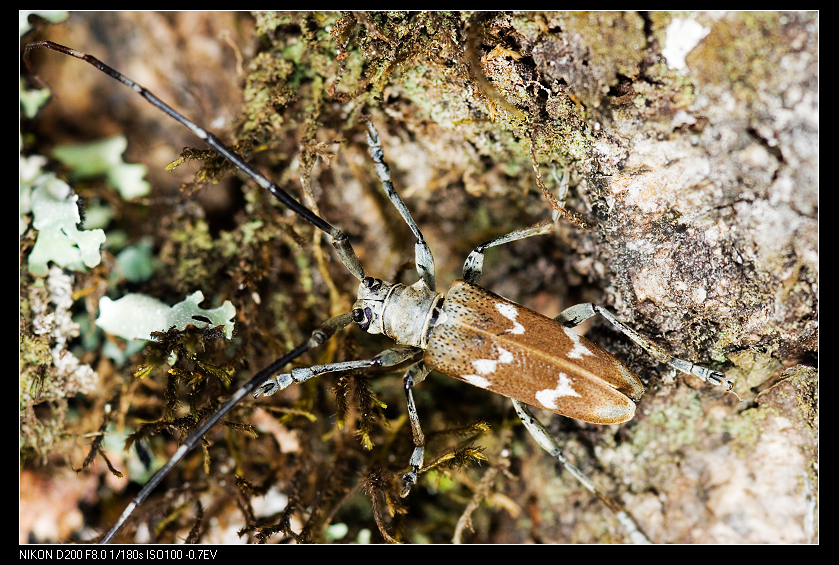

Scientific classification
- Kingdom: Animalia
- Phylum: Arthropoda
- Clade: Pancrustacea
- Class: Insecta
- Order: Coleoptera
- Suborder: Polyphaga
- Infraorder: Cucujiformia
- Family: Cerambycidae
- Genus: Cereopsius
- Species: C. ziczac

Binomial name
- Cereopsius ziczac (Matsushita, 1940)

= Cereopsius ziczac =

Species of beetle

Cereopsius ziczac is a species of beetle in the family Cerambycidae. It was described by Matsushita in 1940. It is known from Taiwan.
