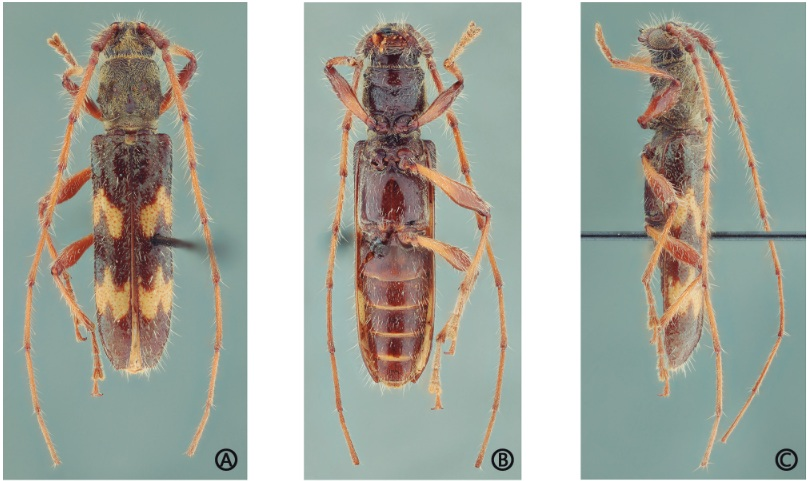
- Male
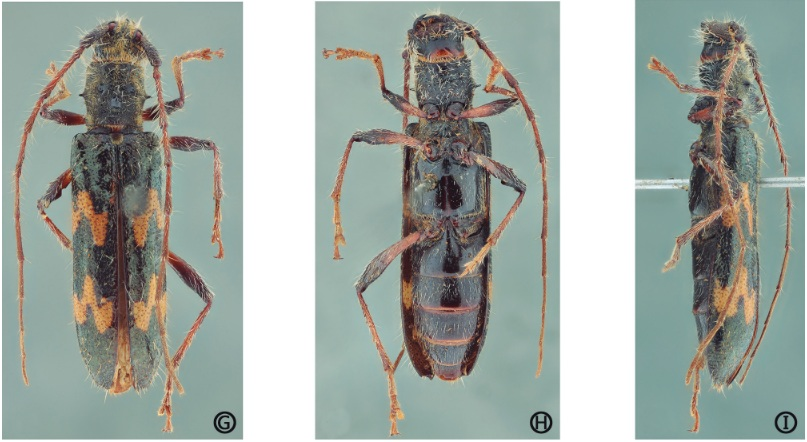
- Female

Scientific classification
- Kingdom: Animalia
- Phylum: Arthropoda
- Clade: Pancrustacea
- Class: Insecta
- Order: Coleoptera
- Suborder: Polyphaga
- Infraorder: Cucujiformia
- Family: Cerambycidae
- Genus: Eligmoderma
- Species: E. ziczac

Binomial name
- Eligmoderma ziczac Nonfried, 1895

= Eligmoderma ziczac =

Species of beetle

Eligmoderma ziczac is a species of beetle in the family Cerambycidae. It was described by Nonfried in 1895. It is found in Panama and Colombia.
