= Compsoctena vilis =

Scientific classification
- Kingdom: Animalia
- Phylum: Arthropoda
- Clade: Pancrustacea
- Class: Insecta
- Order: Lepidoptera
- Family: Eriocottidae
- Genus: Compsoctena
- Species: C. vilis

Binomial name
- Compsoctena vilis (Walker, 1865)

Synonyms
- Gergopis vilis Walker, 1865

Species of moth

Compsoctena vilis is a moth in the family Eriocottidae. It was described by Francis Walker in 1865. It is found in India.
