= Deuterotinea longipennis =

Scientific classification
- Domain: Eukaryota
- Kingdom: Animalia
- Phylum: Arthropoda
- Class: Insecta
- Order: Lepidoptera
- Family: Eriocottidae
- Genus: Deuterotinea
- Species: D. longipennis

Binomial name
- Deuterotinea longipennis (Erschoff, 1874)

Synonyms
- Tinea longipennis Erschoff, 1874

Species of moth

Deuterotinea longipennis is a moth in the Eriocottidae family. It was described by Nikolay Grigoryevich Erschoff in 1874. It is found in Turkmenistan.
