= Compsoctena lycophanes =

Scientific classification
- Kingdom: Animalia
- Phylum: Arthropoda
- Clade: Pancrustacea
- Class: Insecta
- Order: Lepidoptera
- Family: Eriocottidae
- Genus: Compsoctena
- Species: C. lycophanes

Binomial name
- Compsoctena lycophanes (Meyrick, 1924)

Synonyms
- Melasina lycophanes Meyrick, 1924

Species of moth

Compsoctena lycophanes is a moth in the family Eriocottidae. It was described by Edward Meyrick in 1924. It is found in South Africa, where it has been recorded from the Western Cape.
