= Compsoctena spilophanes =

Scientific classification
- Kingdom: Animalia
- Phylum: Arthropoda
- Clade: Pancrustacea
- Class: Insecta
- Order: Lepidoptera
- Family: Eriocottidae
- Genus: Compsoctena
- Species: C. spilophanes

Binomial name
- Compsoctena spilophanes (Meyrick, 1921)

Synonyms
- Melasina spilophanes Meyrick, 1921

Species of moth

Compsoctena spilophanes is a moth in the family Eriocottidae. It was described by Edward Meyrick in 1921. It is found in South Africa and Zimbabwe.

The wingspan is 17–18 mm. The forewings are fuscous, somewhat strigulated obscurely with dark fuscous irroration (speckles) and with ten to fifteen variable irregular shining white spots and blotches edged with dark fuscous. The hindwings are dark fuscous.
