= Eucryptogona =

Scientific classification
- Domain: Eukaryota
- Kingdom: Animalia
- Phylum: Arthropoda
- Class: Insecta
- Order: Lepidoptera
- Family: Eriocottidae
- Genus: Eucryptogona; Lower, 1901

Genus of moths

Eucryptogona is a genus of moths in the family Eriocottidae.

== Species ==
- Eucryptogona trichobathra Lower, 1901

== Former species ==
- Eucryptogona secularis Meyrick, 1918
