= Compsoctena media =

Scientific classification
- Kingdom: Animalia
- Phylum: Arthropoda
- Clade: Pancrustacea
- Class: Insecta
- Order: Lepidoptera
- Family: Eriocottidae
- Genus: Compsoctena
- Species: C. media

Binomial name
- Compsoctena media Walsingham, 1897

Species of moth

Compsoctena media is a moth in the Eriocottidae family. It was described by Walsingham in 1897. It is found in the Central African Republic.

The wingspan is about 16 mm. The forewings are whitish cinereous, mottled and reticulated with brown and with a series of brownish patches along the costa: three small ones before the middle, of which the first two form the upper edge of an ill-defined basal patch, a broad one on the middle of the costa, forming the upper end of a somewhat broken transverse fascia inclining slightly inwards to the dorsum, and two beyond the middle, the first small, the second larger, before the apex, also blending with a shade of brownish scales beneath it. The interspaces between these spots on the outer half of the costa are ochreous, the costal cilia immediately above the apex being also ochreous, and a slight ochreous shade runs through the base of the cilia along the termen, in which are three more or less distinct lines of brown scales, the outer extremities of the cilia are greyish. The hindwings are purplish grey.
