= Compsoctena aedifica =

Scientific classification
- Kingdom: Animalia
- Phylum: Arthropoda
- Clade: Pancrustacea
- Class: Insecta
- Order: Lepidoptera
- Family: Eriocottidae
- Genus: Compsoctena
- Species: C. aedifica

Binomial name
- Compsoctena aedifica (Meyrick, 1908)

Synonyms
- Melasina aedifica Meyrick, 1908

Species of moth

Compsoctena aedifica is a moth in the family Eriocottidae. It was described by Edward Meyrick in 1908. It is found in Gauteng, South Africa.

The wingspan is 20–24 mm. The forewings are whitish, with scattered small blackish-fuscous strigulae. The costal edge is whitish ochreous and there are irregular markings formed of confluent cloudy blackish-fuscous strigulae, consisting of a small, sometimes partially obsolete, basal patch, a moderate fascia from one-third of the costa to the middle of the dorsum, another from three-fifths of the costa to the tornus, and a transverse spot from five-sixths of the costa, reaching half across the wing. The hindwings are ochreous whitish, more or less tinged with grey.
