= Compsoctena dermatodes =

Scientific classification
- Kingdom: Animalia
- Phylum: Arthropoda
- Clade: Pancrustacea
- Class: Insecta
- Order: Lepidoptera
- Family: Eriocottidae
- Genus: Compsoctena
- Species: C. dermatodes

Binomial name
- Compsoctena dermatodes (Meyrick, 1914)

Synonyms
- Melasina dermatodes Meyrick, 1914

Species of moth

Compsoctena dermatodes is a moth in the family Eriocottidae. It was described by Edward Meyrick in 1914. It is found in South Africa, Tanzania and Zimbabwe.

The wingspan is 22–24 mm. The forewings are light brownish ochreous, indistinctly strigulated with brownish, sometimes slightly mixed with whitish between the strigulae. There is a fuscous dot on the end of the cell. The hindwings are dark fuscous.
