= Compsoctena brandbergensis =

Scientific classification
- Kingdom: Animalia
- Phylum: Arthropoda
- Clade: Pancrustacea
- Class: Insecta
- Order: Lepidoptera
- Family: Eriocottidae
- Genus: Compsoctena
- Species: C. brandbergensis

Binomial name
- Compsoctena brandbergensis Mey, 2007

Species of moth

Compsoctena brandbergensis is a moth in the family Eriocottidae. It was described by Wolfram Mey in 2007. It is found in Namibia.
