= Deuterotinea macropodella =

Scientific classification
- Domain: Eukaryota
- Kingdom: Animalia
- Phylum: Arthropoda
- Class: Insecta
- Order: Lepidoptera
- Family: Eriocottidae
- Genus: Deuterotinea
- Species: D. macropodella

Binomial name
- Deuterotinea macropodella (Erschoff, 1874)

Synonyms
- Tineola macropodella Erschoff, 1874

Species of moth

Deuterotinea macropodella is a moth in the Eriocottidae family. It was described by Nikolay Grigoryevich Erschoff in 1874. It is found in Turkmenistan.

It is a synonym of Pararhodobates syriacus (Lederer, 1857).
