= Compsoctena niphocosma =

Scientific classification
- Kingdom: Animalia
- Phylum: Arthropoda
- Clade: Pancrustacea
- Class: Insecta
- Order: Lepidoptera
- Family: Eriocottidae
- Genus: Compsoctena
- Species: C. niphocosma

Binomial name
- Compsoctena niphocosma (Meyrick, 1934)

Synonyms
- Melasina niphocosma Meyrick, 1934

Species of moth

Compsoctena niphocosma is a moth in the family Eriocottidae. It was described by Edward Meyrick in 1934. It is found in Tanzania.
