= Compsoctena ochrastis =

Scientific classification
- Kingdom: Animalia
- Phylum: Arthropoda
- Clade: Pancrustacea
- Class: Insecta
- Order: Lepidoptera
- Family: Eriocottidae
- Genus: Compsoctena
- Species: C. ochrastis

Binomial name
- Compsoctena ochrastis (Meyrick, 1937)

Synonyms
- Melasina ochrastis Meyrick, 1937

Species of moth

Compsoctena ochrastis is a moth in the family Eriocottidae. It was described by Edward Meyrick in 1937. It is found in South Africa.
