= Deuterotinea axiurga =

Scientific classification
- Domain: Eukaryota
- Kingdom: Animalia
- Phylum: Arthropoda
- Class: Insecta
- Order: Lepidoptera
- Family: Eriocottidae
- Genus: Deuterotinea
- Species: D. axiurga

Binomial name
- Deuterotinea axiurga (Meyrick, 1922)

Synonyms
- Cronodoxa axiurga Meyrick, 1922

Species of moth

Deuterotinea axiurga is a moth in the family Eriocottidae. It was described by Edward Meyrick in 1922. It is found in Syria.

The wingspan is about 30 mm. The forewings are purplish fuscous, obscurely irrorated (sprinkled) with darker. The hindwings are pale grey.
