= Deuterotinea balcanica =

Scientific classification
- Kingdom: Animalia
- Phylum: Arthropoda
- Class: Insecta
- Order: Lepidoptera
- Family: Eriocottidae
- Genus: Deuterotinea
- Species: D. balcanica

Binomial name
- Deuterotinea balcanica Zagulajev, 1972

Species of moth

Deuterotinea balcanica is a moth in the Eriocottidae family. It was described by Zagulajev in 1972. It is found in Bulgaria.
