= Deuterotinea casanella =

Scientific classification
- Domain: Eukaryota
- Kingdom: Animalia
- Phylum: Arthropoda
- Class: Insecta
- Order: Lepidoptera
- Family: Eriocottidae
- Genus: Deuterotinea
- Species: D. casanella

Binomial name
- Deuterotinea casanella (Eversmann, 1844)

Synonyms
- Scardia casanella Eversmann, 1844; Chersis tauridella Guenée, 1845

Species of moth

Deuterotinea casanella is a moth in the Eriocottidae family. It was described by Eduard Friedrich Eversmann in 1844. It is found in Romania, Ukraine and southern Russia.
