= Compsoctena isopetra =

Scientific classification
- Kingdom: Animalia
- Phylum: Arthropoda
- Clade: Pancrustacea
- Class: Insecta
- Order: Lepidoptera
- Family: Eriocottidae
- Genus: Compsoctena
- Species: C. isopetra

Binomial name
- Compsoctena isopetra (Meyrick, 1921)

Synonyms
- Melasina isopetra Meyrick, 1921

Species of moth

Compsoctena isopetra is a moth in the family Eriocottidae. It was described by Edward Meyrick in 1921. It is found in South Africa and Zimbabwe.

The wingspan is about 18 mm. The forewings are light grey, thinly and irregularly speckled with whitish and dark grey and with a whitish costal edge. The hindwings are grey.
