= Compsoctena terrestris =

Scientific classification
- Kingdom: Animalia
- Phylum: Arthropoda
- Clade: Pancrustacea
- Class: Insecta
- Order: Lepidoptera
- Family: Eriocottidae
- Genus: Compsoctena
- Species: C. terrestris

Binomial name
- Compsoctena terrestris (Meyrick, 1914)

Synonyms
- Melasina terrestris Meyrick, 1914

Species of moth

Compsoctena terrestris is a moth in the family Eriocottidae. It was described by Edward Meyrick in 1914. It is found in South Africa, where it has been recorded from Gauteng.

The wingspan is 16–18 mm for males and 22–23 mm for females. The forewings are fuscous somewhat sprinkled with whitish fuscous, and with dark fuscous scales tending to form very obscure scattered strigulae. The hindwings are rather dark fuscous.
