= Compsoctena quassa =

Scientific classification
- Kingdom: Animalia
- Phylum: Arthropoda
- Clade: Pancrustacea
- Class: Insecta
- Order: Lepidoptera
- Family: Eriocottidae
- Genus: Compsoctena
- Species: C. quassa

Binomial name
- Compsoctena quassa (Meyrick, 1921)

Synonyms
- Melasina quassa Meyrick, 1921

Species of moth

Compsoctena quassa is a moth in the family Eriocottidae. It was described by Edward Meyrick in 1921. It is found in South Africa, Zambia and Zimbabwe.

The wingspan is about 31 mm. The forewings are grey, closely and suffusedly reticulated with dark fuscous irroration (sprinkles) and with a few grey-whitish scales, as well as obscure irregular spots of dark fuscous suffusion placed as a stigmata, the plical somewhat beyond the first discal. The hindwings are rather dark grey.
