= Compsoctena connexalis =

Scientific classification
- Kingdom: Animalia
- Phylum: Arthropoda
- Clade: Pancrustacea
- Class: Insecta
- Order: Lepidoptera
- Family: Eriocottidae
- Genus: Compsoctena
- Species: C. connexalis

Binomial name
- Compsoctena connexalis (Walker, 1863)

Synonyms
- Tissa connexalis Walker, 1863

Species of moth

Compsoctena connexalis is a moth in the family Eriocottidae. It was described by Francis Walker in 1863. It is found in South Africa.

Adults are dark cinereous (ash gray), the forewings with a few black points near the base, and with three dark brown marks, which have black and silvery borders. These marks consist of two interior spots and a broad exterior undulating streak, which is forked towards the costa. The marginal line is silvery, with an exterior blackish border, which is interrupted by some silvery streaks on the brownish-cinereous fringe. The hindwings are brownish cinereous.
