= Compsoctena talarodes =

Scientific classification
- Kingdom: Animalia
- Phylum: Arthropoda
- Clade: Pancrustacea
- Class: Insecta
- Order: Lepidoptera
- Family: Eriocottidae
- Genus: Compsoctena
- Species: C. talarodes

Binomial name
- Compsoctena talarodes (Meyrick, 1927)

Synonyms
- Melasina talarodes Meyrick, 1927

Species of moth

Compsoctena talarodes is a moth in the family Eriocottidae. It was described by Edward Meyrick in 1927. It is found in Tanzania and Zimbabwe.
