= Compsoctena similis =

Scientific classification
- Kingdom: Animalia
- Phylum: Arthropoda
- Clade: Pancrustacea
- Class: Insecta
- Order: Lepidoptera
- Family: Eriocottidae
- Genus: Compsoctena
- Species: C. similis

Binomial name
- Compsoctena similis Dierl, 1970

Species of moth

Compsoctena similis is a moth in the family Eriocottidae. It was described by Wolfgang Dierl in 1970. It is found in Tanzania.
