= Compsoctena aethalea =

Scientific classification
- Kingdom: Animalia
- Phylum: Arthropoda
- Clade: Pancrustacea
- Class: Insecta
- Order: Lepidoptera
- Family: Eriocottidae
- Genus: Compsoctena
- Species: C. aethalea

Binomial name
- Compsoctena aethalea (Meyrick, 1907)

Synonyms
- Melasina aethalea Meyrick, 1908

Species of moth

Compsoctena aethalea is a moth in the family Eriocottidae. It was described by Edward Meyrick in 1907. It is found in India.

The wingspan is 30–34 mm for males and about 46 mm for females. The forewings of the males are dark fuscous, finely irrorated (sprinkled) with whitish. In females, they are paler, strewn with blackish-fuscous strigulae. There is a dark fuscous transverse fascia-like blotch from the middle of the dorsum, reaching about halfway across the wing and a similar blotch from the middle of the costa directed towards the tornus, reaching more than halfway across the wing. The costa is more or less spotted alternately with pale ochreous yellowish and dark fuscous posteriorly and there are two or three dark fuscous subterminal spots sometimes united into an incomplete fascia. The hindwings are blackish fuscous.
