= Compsoctena numeraria =

Scientific classification
- Kingdom: Animalia
- Phylum: Arthropoda
- Clade: Pancrustacea
- Class: Insecta
- Order: Lepidoptera
- Family: Eriocottidae
- Genus: Compsoctena
- Species: C. numeraria

Binomial name
- Compsoctena numeraria (Meyrick, 1914)

Synonyms
- Melasina numeraria Meyrick, 1914

Species of moth

Compsoctena numeraria is a moth in the family Eriocottidae. It was described by Edward Meyrick in 1914. It is found in South Africa, where it has been recorded from Gauteng.

The wingspan is about 23 mm. The forewings are light ochreous yellowish, strewn except along the costa with scattered dark fuscous scales more or less arranged in longitudinal lines, and tending to form small transverse strigulae. The costal edge is dark fuscous towards the base and there is a dark fuscous dot on the end of the cell, and an irregular streak of dark fuscous irroration (speckles) running from this to the apex. There are scattered dark fuscous scales along the terminal edge. The hindwings are pale greyish.
