= Eriocottis hispanica =

Scientific classification
- Domain: Eukaryota
- Kingdom: Animalia
- Phylum: Arthropoda
- Class: Insecta
- Order: Lepidoptera
- Family: Eriocottidae
- Genus: Eriocottis
- Species: E. hispanica

Binomial name
- Eriocottis hispanica Zagulajev, 1988

Species of moth

Eriocottis hispanica is a moth in the Eriocottidae family. It was described by Zagulajev in 1988. It is found in Spain and Portugal.
