= Compsoctena ostracitis =

Scientific classification
- Kingdom: Animalia
- Phylum: Arthropoda
- Clade: Pancrustacea
- Class: Insecta
- Order: Lepidoptera
- Family: Eriocottidae
- Genus: Compsoctena
- Species: C. ostracitis

Binomial name
- Compsoctena ostracitis (Meyrick, 1913)

Synonyms
- Melasina ostracitis Meyrick, 1913

Species of moth

Compsoctena ostracitis is a moth in the family Eriocottidae. It was described by Edward Meyrick in 1913. It is found in South Africa.

The wingspan is about 16 mm. The forewings are ochreous whitish with the costal edge blackish at the base. The hindwings are light grey.
