= Eriocottis fuscanella =

Scientific classification
- Kingdom: Animalia
- Phylum: Arthropoda
- Clade: Pancrustacea
- Class: Insecta
- Order: Lepidoptera
- Family: Eriocottidae
- Genus: Eriocottis
- Species: E. fuscanella

Binomial name
- Eriocottis fuscanella Zeller, 1847

Species of moth

Eriocottis fuscanella is a moth of the family Eriocottidae. It was described by Philipp Christoph Zeller in 1847. It is found in Italy and on Sardinia, Sicily and Malta.
