= Compsoctena brachyctenis =

Scientific classification
- Kingdom: Animalia
- Phylum: Arthropoda
- Clade: Pancrustacea
- Class: Insecta
- Order: Lepidoptera
- Family: Eriocottidae
- Genus: Compsoctena
- Species: C. brachyctenis

Binomial name
- Compsoctena brachyctenis (Meyrick, 1909)

Synonyms
- Melasina brachyctenis Meyrick, 1909

Species of moth

Compsoctena brachyctenis is a moth in the family Eriocottidae. It was described by Edward Meyrick in 1909. It is found in South Africa.

The wingspan is about 24 mm. The forewings are ochreous whitish, irregularly strewn with suffused fuscous strigulae irrorated (sprinkled) with blackish fuscous, appearing to form a small basal patch. There is a broad streak along anterior two-thirds of the costa, a broad bent median fascia, and a patch in the disc posteriorly, but these are all very indefinite. The ground colour appears to form a clear white patch towards the dorsum before the middle, and another towards the costa beyond the middle. There are about five small dark fuscous spots on the posterior half of the costa. The hindwings are grey, sprinkled with darker.
