= Compsoctena taprobana =

Scientific classification
- Kingdom: Animalia
- Phylum: Arthropoda
- Clade: Pancrustacea
- Class: Insecta
- Order: Lepidoptera
- Family: Eriocottidae
- Genus: Compsoctena
- Species: C. taprobana

Binomial name
- Compsoctena taprobana (Walsingham, 1887)

Synonyms
- Alavona taprobana Walsingham, 1887

Species of moth

Compsoctena taprobana is a moth in the Eriocottidae family. It was described by Walsingham in 1887. It is found in Sri Lanka.
