= Deuterotinea =

Scientific classification
- Domain: Eukaryota
- Kingdom: Animalia
- Phylum: Arthropoda
- Class: Insecta
- Order: Lepidoptera
- Family: Eriocottidae
- Genus: Deuterotinea; Rebel, 1901

Synonyms
- Chersis Guenée, 1845; Cronodoxa Meyrick, 1922; Tineastra Staudinger, 1859

Genus of moths

Deuterotinea is a genus of moths in the Eriocottidae family.

== Species ==
- Deuterotinea auronitens Lucas, 1956
- Deuterotinea axiurga Meyrick, 1922
- Deuterotinea balcanica Zagulajev, 1972
- Deuterotinea casanella Eversmann, 1844
- Deuterotinea instabilis Meyrick, 1924
- Deuterotinea longipennis Erschoff, 1874
- Deuterotinea macropodella Erschoff, 1874
- Deuterotinea maracandica Zagulajev, 1988
- Deuterotinea palaestinensis Rebel, 1901
- Deuterotinea stschetkini Zagulajev, 1972

== Former species ==
- Deuterotinea decoratella de Joannis, 1917
- Deuterotinea nervatella de Joannis, 1917
- Deuterotinea paradoxella Staudinger, 1859
- Deuterotinea tauridella (Guenée, 1845)
