= Compsoctena primella =

Scientific classification
- Kingdom: Animalia
- Phylum: Arthropoda
- Clade: Pancrustacea
- Class: Insecta
- Order: Lepidoptera
- Family: Eriocottidae
- Genus: Compsoctena
- Species: C. primella

Binomial name
- Compsoctena primella Zeller, 1852

Synonyms
- Tissa inquinatalis Walker, 1863; Thapava natalana Walker, 1864; Galaria subauratana Walker, 1866

Species of moth

Compsoctena primella is a moth in the family Eriocottidae. It was described by Philipp Christoph Zeller in 1852. It is found in South Africa.
