= Crepidochares subtigrina =

Scientific classification
- Kingdom: Animalia
- Phylum: Arthropoda
- Class: Insecta
- Order: Lepidoptera
- Family: Eriocottidae
- Genus: Crepidochares
- Species: C. subtigrina

Binomial name
- Crepidochares subtigrina Meyrick, 1922

Species of moth

Crepidochares subtigrina is a moth in the family Eriocottidae. It was described by Edward Meyrick in 1922. It is found in Brazil, where it has been recorded only from Amazonas in an area along the Amazon River.

The length of the forewings is about 7.8 mm, wingspan 17 mm.
