= Crepidochares aridula =

Scientific classification
- Kingdom: Animalia
- Phylum: Arthropoda
- Class: Insecta
- Order: Lepidoptera
- Family: Eriocottidae
- Genus: Crepidochares
- Species: C. aridula

Binomial name
- Crepidochares aridula Davis, 1990

Species of moth

Crepidochares aridula is a moth in the family Eriocottidae. It was described by Donald R. Davis in 1990. It is found in central Chile.

Adults are on wing from the end of October to December.

== Etymology ==
The species name refers to the more xeric habitat of this species and is derived from Latin aridulus (diminutive of dry).
