= Compsoctena minor =

Scientific classification
- Kingdom: Animalia
- Phylum: Arthropoda
- Clade: Pancrustacea
- Class: Insecta
- Order: Lepidoptera
- Family: Eriocottidae
- Genus: Compsoctena
- Species: C. minor

Binomial name
- Compsoctena minor (Walsingham, 1866)

Synonyms
- Alavona minor Walsingham, 1866

Species of moth

Compsoctena minor is a moth in the family Eriocottidae. It was first described by Walsingham in 1866. It is found in India.
