= Compsoctena himachalensis =

Scientific classification
- Kingdom: Animalia
- Phylum: Arthropoda
- Clade: Pancrustacea
- Class: Insecta
- Order: Lepidoptera
- Family: Eriocottidae
- Genus: Compsoctena
- Species: C. himachalensis

Binomial name
- Compsoctena himachalensis Pathania & Rose, 2004

Species of moth

Compsoctena himachalensis is a moth in the Eriocottidae family. It was described by Pathania and Rose in 2004. It is found in India (Himachal Pradesh).

== Etymology ==
The species is named for Himachal Pradesh, where the species has been recorded.
