= Crepidochares austrina =

Scientific classification
- Kingdom: Animalia
- Phylum: Arthropoda
- Class: Insecta
- Order: Lepidoptera
- Family: Eriocottidae
- Genus: Crepidochares
- Species: C. austrina

Binomial name
- Crepidochares austrina Davis, 1990

Species of moth

Crepidochares austrina is a moth in the family Eriocottidae. It was described by Donald R. Davis in 1990. It is found in Chile.

The length of the forewings is 4.6–6 mm for males and 5.8–6.1 mm for females. Adults are on wing from the mid-November to mid-December in one generation per year.
