= Compsoctena furciformis =

Scientific classification
- Kingdom: Animalia
- Phylum: Arthropoda
- Clade: Pancrustacea
- Class: Insecta
- Order: Lepidoptera
- Family: Eriocottidae
- Genus: Compsoctena
- Species: C. furciformis

Binomial name
- Compsoctena furciformis (Meyrick, 1921)

Synonyms
- Melasina furciformis Meyrick, 1921

Species of moth

Compsoctena furciformis is a moth in the family Eriocottidae. It was described by Edward Meyrick in 1921. It is found in South Africa and Zimbabwe.

The wingspan is 21–22 mm. The forewings are whitish fuscous, reticulated with brown sprinkled with blackish. The markings are brown irregularly sprinkled or irrorated with black, especially on the veins. There is a moderate ill-defined basal fascia and a moderate fascia from two-fifths of the costa to the middle of the dorsum, the anterior edge almost straight and the posterior edge obtusely angulated below the middle. There is a moderate fascia from two-thirds of the costa to the tornus, narrowed near the lower extremity, with a rather excurved narrower branch running from its middle to the costa before the apex. The hindwings are rather dark grey.
