= Compsoctena araeopis =

Scientific classification
- Kingdom: Animalia
- Phylum: Arthropoda
- Clade: Pancrustacea
- Class: Insecta
- Order: Lepidoptera
- Family: Eriocottidae
- Genus: Compsoctena
- Species: C. araeopis

Binomial name
- Compsoctena araeopis (Meyrick, 1926)

Synonyms
- Melasina araeopis Meyrick, 1926

Species of moth

Compsoctena araeopis is a moth in the family Eriocottidae. It was described by Edward Meyrick in 1926. It is found in Namibia.
