= Compsoctena thwaitesii =

Scientific classification
- Kingdom: Animalia
- Phylum: Arthropoda
- Clade: Pancrustacea
- Class: Insecta
- Order: Lepidoptera
- Family: Eriocottidae
- Genus: Compsoctena
- Species: C. thwaitesii

Binomial name
- Compsoctena thwaitesii (Walsingham, 1887)

Synonyms
- Alavona thwaitesii Walsingham, 1887; Compsoctena thaitesii

Species of moth

Compsoctena thwaitesii is a moth in the Eriocottidae family. It was described by Walsingham in 1887. It is found in Sri Lanka.
