= Compsoctena cossusella =

Scientific classification
- Kingdom: Animalia
- Phylum: Arthropoda
- Clade: Pancrustacea
- Class: Insecta
- Order: Lepidoptera
- Family: Eriocottidae
- Genus: Compsoctena
- Species: C. cossusella

Binomial name
- Compsoctena cossusella (Walker, 1856)

Synonyms
- Alavona cossusella Walker, 1856

Species of moth

Compsoctena cossusella is a moth in the family Eriocottidae, first described by Francis Walker in 1856. It is found in Nepal.

Adults are cinereous (ash gray), speckled with brown. The forewings are rounded at the tips and transversely streaked with dark brown. There are four connected and very irregular brown patches in the exterior disk, and a fifth contiguous to the base of the interior border. The costa is brown towards the base.
