= Compsoctena ursulella =

Scientific classification
- Kingdom: Animalia
- Phylum: Arthropoda
- Clade: Pancrustacea
- Class: Insecta
- Order: Lepidoptera
- Family: Eriocottidae
- Genus: Compsoctena
- Species: C. ursulella

Binomial name
- Compsoctena ursulella (Walker, 1863)

Synonyms
- Alavona ursulella Walker, 1863

Species of moth

Compsoctena ursulella is a moth in the family Eriocottidae. It was described by Francis Walker in 1863. It is found in Sierra Leone.

Adults are cinereous (ash gray), the forewings with diffuse black speckles and slightly rounded at the tips.
