= Compsoctena rustica =

Scientific classification
- Kingdom: Animalia
- Phylum: Arthropoda
- Clade: Pancrustacea
- Class: Insecta
- Order: Lepidoptera
- Family: Eriocottidae
- Genus: Compsoctena
- Species: C. rustica

Binomial name
- Compsoctena rustica (Strand, 1914)

Synonyms
- Melasina rustica Strand, 1914

Species of moth

Compsoctena rustica is a moth in the Eriocottidae family. It was described by Strand in 1914. It is found in Cameroon.
