= Compsoctena africanella =

Scientific classification
- Kingdom: Animalia
- Phylum: Arthropoda
- Clade: Pancrustacea
- Class: Insecta
- Order: Lepidoptera
- Family: Eriocottidae
- Genus: Compsoctena
- Species: C. africanella

Binomial name
- Compsoctena africanella (Strand, 1909)

Synonyms
- Alavona africanella Strand, 1909

Species of moth

Compsoctena africanella is a moth in the Eriocottidae family. It was described by Strand in 1909. It is found in Botswana, Malawi, Mozambique, South Africa, Tanzania and Zambia.
