= Eriocottis flavicephalana =

Scientific classification
- Kingdom: Animalia
- Phylum: Arthropoda
- Class: Insecta
- Order: Lepidoptera
- Family: Eriocottidae
- Genus: Eriocottis
- Species: E. flavicephalana

Binomial name
- Eriocottis flavicephalana Issiki, 1930

Species of moth

Eriocottis flavicephalana is a moth in the family Eriocottidae. It was described by Syuti Issiki in 1930. It is found in Taiwan.
