= Eriocottis nicolaeella =

Scientific classification
- Kingdom: Animalia
- Phylum: Arthropoda
- Clade: Pancrustacea
- Class: Insecta
- Order: Lepidoptera
- Family: Eriocottidae
- Genus: Eriocottis
- Species: E. nicolaeella

Binomial name
- Eriocottis nicolaeella Gibeaux, 1983

Species of moth

Eriocottis nicolaeella is a moth in the family Eriocottidae. It was described by Christian Gibeaux in 1983. It is found in France and Spain.
