= Compsoctena invariella =

Scientific classification
- Kingdom: Animalia
- Phylum: Arthropoda
- Clade: Pancrustacea
- Class: Insecta
- Order: Lepidoptera
- Family: Eriocottidae
- Genus: Compsoctena
- Species: C. invariella

Binomial name
- Compsoctena invariella (Walker, 1863)

Synonyms
- Torna invariella Walker, 1863

Species of moth

Compsoctena invariella is a moth in the family Eriocottidae. It was described by Francis Walker in 1863. It is found in India.
