= Compsoctena psammosticha =

Scientific classification
- Kingdom: Animalia
- Phylum: Arthropoda
- Clade: Pancrustacea
- Class: Insecta
- Order: Lepidoptera
- Family: Eriocottidae
- Genus: Compsoctena
- Species: C. psammosticha

Binomial name
- Compsoctena psammosticha (Meyrick, 1921)

Synonyms
- Melasina psammosticha Meyrick, 1921

Species of moth

Compsoctena psammosticha is a moth in the family Eriocottidae. It was described by Edward Meyrick in 1921. It is found in Malawi, South Africa and Zimbabwe.

The wingspan is 25–30 mm. The forewings are ochreous, suffusedly reticulated with brownish ochreous. The hindwings are dark grey.
