= Compsoctena susurrans =

Scientific classification
- Kingdom: Animalia
- Phylum: Arthropoda
- Clade: Pancrustacea
- Class: Insecta
- Order: Lepidoptera
- Family: Eriocottidae
- Genus: Compsoctena
- Species: C. susurrans

Binomial name
- Compsoctena susurrans (Meyrick, 1911)

Synonyms
- Melasina susurrans Meyrick, 1911

Species of moth

Compsoctena susurrans is a moth in the family Eriocottidae. It was described by Edward Meyrick in 1911. It is found in South Africa, where it has been recorded from Limpopo.

The wingspan is about 24 mm for males and 26 mm for females. The forewings are white, transversely striated throughout with brownish ochreous and more or less irrorated (sprinkled) with dark fuscous and blackish, the coalescence of these striae indicates a small basal patch, a narrow fascia from one-third of the costa to before the middle of the dorsum, with the posterior edge angulated below the middle. There is a narrow fascia from two-thirds of the costa to the dorsum before the tornus, and a slender more or less marked inwards-sinuate fascia from the costa before the apex to the tornus. The hindwings are pale fuscous.
