= Eucryptogona trichobathra =

Scientific classification
- Domain: Eukaryota
- Kingdom: Animalia
- Phylum: Arthropoda
- Class: Insecta
- Order: Lepidoptera
- Family: Eriocottidae
- Genus: Eucryptogona
- Species: E. trichobathra

Binomial name
- Eucryptogona trichobathra Lower, 1901

Species of moth

Eucryptogona trichobathra is a moth in the family Eriocottidae described by Oswald Bertram Lower in 1901. It is found in the Australian state of New South Wales.

The wingspan is about 20 mm. The forewings are greyish fuscous, strongly mixed with ferruginous, reddish and black scales. The markings are blackish and obscure and there is a suffused streak beneath the costa, from the base to the middle, as well as a streak on the fold from the base to the cell and a spot at the end of the cell, a mark in the middle of the cell, a suffused spot on the inner margin near the base and an interrupted streak along the termen, edged posteriorly by fuscous reddish. The hindwings are fuscous.
