= Crepidochares colombiae =

Scientific classification
- Kingdom: Animalia
- Phylum: Arthropoda
- Class: Insecta
- Order: Lepidoptera
- Family: Eriocottidae
- Genus: Crepidochares
- Species: C. colombiae

Binomial name
- Crepidochares colombiae Davis, 1990

Species of moth

Crepidochares colombiae is a moth in the family Eriocottidae. It was described by Donald R. Davis in 1990. It is found in Colombia.

== Etymology ==
The species is named for Colombia, the country of origin.
