= Compsoctena fossoria =

Scientific classification
- Kingdom: Animalia
- Phylum: Arthropoda
- Clade: Pancrustacea
- Class: Insecta
- Order: Lepidoptera
- Family: Eriocottidae
- Genus: Compsoctena
- Species: C. fossoria

Binomial name
- Compsoctena fossoria (Meyrick, 1920)

Synonyms
- Melasina fossoria Meyrick, 1920

Species of moth

Compsoctena fossoria is a moth in the family Eriocottidae. It was described by Edward Meyrick in 1920. It is found in South Africa.

The wingspan is 19–21 mm. The forewings are grey, much suffused with whitish. There is a basal fascia of dark fuscous suffused irroration (sprinkling), continued as a broad streak along the costa to two-fifths, thence rather obliquely across the wing to near the dorsum, again angulated and continued to near the costa at four-fifths, with a branch to the tornus. A similar spot is found on the costa beyond the middle, and three or four small spots on the costa posteriorly. The hindwings are light fuscous grey.
