= Compsoctena intermediella =

Scientific classification
- Kingdom: Animalia
- Phylum: Arthropoda
- Clade: Pancrustacea
- Class: Insecta
- Order: Lepidoptera
- Family: Eriocottidae
- Genus: Compsoctena
- Species: C. intermediella

Binomial name
- Compsoctena intermediella (Walker, 1866)

Synonyms
- Alavona intermediella Walker, 1866

Species of moth

Compsoctena intermediella is a moth in the family Eriocottidae. It was described by Francis Walker in 1866. It is found in India.

Adults are cinereous-brown speckled, the forewings slightly reticulated with blackish. There is a brown middle band, which is much dilated and widely excavated towards the costa. There are also several blackish dots along the costa and two in the excavated part of the band.
