= Deuterotinea stschetkini =

Scientific classification
- Domain: Eukaryota
- Kingdom: Animalia
- Phylum: Arthropoda
- Class: Insecta
- Order: Lepidoptera
- Family: Eriocottidae
- Genus: Deuterotinea
- Species: D. stschetkini

Binomial name
- Deuterotinea stschetkini Zagulajev, 1972

Species of moth

Deuterotinea stschetkini is a moth in the Eriocottidae family. It was described by Zagulajev in 1972. It is found in Turkmenistan and Tajikistan.
