= Compsoctena cyclatma =

Scientific classification
- Kingdom: Animalia
- Phylum: Arthropoda
- Clade: Pancrustacea
- Class: Insecta
- Order: Lepidoptera
- Family: Eriocottidae
- Genus: Compsoctena
- Species: C. cyclatma

Binomial name
- Compsoctena cyclatma (Meyrick, 1908)

Synonyms
- Melasina cyclatma Meyrick, 1908

Species of moth

Compsoctena cyclatma is a moth in the family Eriocottidae. It was described by Edward Meyrick in 1908. It is found in Mozambique, South Africa (Limpopo), Zambia and Zimbabwe.

The wingspan is about 28 mm. The forewings are fuscous, somewhat sprinkled with whitish and irregularly and suffusedly irrorated (sprinkled) with blackish fuscous, the confluence of irroration forming several irregular broken longitudinal marks, and three or four spots on the posterior half of the costa. There is a rounded blotch of whitish suffusion on the dorsum before the middle, and an irregular streak of whitish suffusion along the posterior third of the dorsum and termen to the apex. The hindwings are grey.
