= Eriocottis =

Scientific classification
- Kingdom: Animalia
- Phylum: Arthropoda
- Clade: Pancrustacea
- Class: Insecta
- Order: Lepidoptera
- Family: Eriocottidae
- Genus: Eriocottis; Zeller, 1847

Genus of moths

Eriocottis is a genus of moths in the family Eriocottidae.

== Species ==
- Eriocottis andalusiella Rebel, 1901
- Eriocottis flavicephalana Issiki, 1930
- Eriocottis fuscanella Zeller, 1847
- Eriocottis hispanica Zagulajev, 1988
- Eriocottis maraschensis Rebel, 1936
- Eriocottis nicolaeella Gibeaux, 1983
- Eriocottis paradoxella (Staudinger, 1859)
- Eriocottis pyrocoma Meyrick, 1891

== Former species ==
- Eriocottis nodicornella Rebel, 1911
- Eriocottis recticostella Caradja, 1920
