= Compsoctena expers =

Scientific classification
- Kingdom: Animalia
- Phylum: Arthropoda
- Clade: Pancrustacea
- Class: Insecta
- Order: Lepidoptera
- Family: Eriocottidae
- Genus: Compsoctena
- Species: C. expers

Binomial name
- Compsoctena expers (Meyrick, 1911)

Synonyms
- Melasina expers Meyrick, 1911

Species of moth

Compsoctena expers is a moth in the family Eriocottidae. It was described by Edward Meyrick in 1911. It is found in Namibia and Zimbabwe.

The wingspan is about 23 mm. The forewings are fuscous irregularly irrorated (sprinkled) with whitish, and strigulated with dark fuscous irroration. There is an elongate mark of darker suffusion beneath the middle of the disc, terminated at each end with whitish, but no other defined markings. The hindwings are fuscous.
