= Compsoctena secundella =

Scientific classification
- Kingdom: Animalia
- Phylum: Arthropoda
- Clade: Pancrustacea
- Class: Insecta
- Order: Lepidoptera
- Family: Eriocottidae
- Genus: Compsoctena
- Species: C. secundella

Binomial name
- Compsoctena secundella (Walsingham, 1897)

Synonyms
- Eccompsoctena secundella Walsingham, 1897

Species of moth

Compsoctena secundella is a moth in the Eriocottidae family. It was described by Walsingham in 1897. It is found in the Central African Republic and Sierra Leone.

The wingspan is about 22 mm. The forewings are pale ochreous, thickly mottled, speckled and suffused with umber-brown scales, the two colours alternating along the costa in unequal spaces throughout. There is a rather strong patch of umber-brown scales at the end of the disc, which appears to be the only point at which this colour is more concentrated than on the remainder of the wing-surface, although it somewhat prevails also towards the apex and tornus. The hindwings are purplish fuscous.
