= Compsoctena indecorella =

Scientific classification
- Kingdom: Animalia
- Phylum: Arthropoda
- Clade: Pancrustacea
- Class: Insecta
- Order: Lepidoptera
- Family: Eriocottidae
- Genus: Compsoctena
- Species: C. indecorella

Binomial name
- Compsoctena indecorella (Walker, 1856)

Synonyms
- Alavona indecorella Walker, 1856

Species of moth

Compsoctena indecorella is a moth in the family Eriocottidae. It was described by Francis Walker in 1856. It is found in India.

Adults are cinereous (ash grey) brown, the forewings very minutely blackish speckled. The hindwings are more cinereous, very minutely brown speckled.
