= Deuterotinea palaestinensis =

Scientific classification
- Domain: Eukaryota
- Kingdom: Animalia
- Phylum: Arthropoda
- Class: Insecta
- Order: Lepidoptera
- Family: Eriocottidae
- Genus: Deuterotinea
- Species: D. palaestinensis

Binomial name
- Deuterotinea palaestinensis Rebel, 1901

Species of moth

Deuterotinea palaestinensis is a moth in the family Eriocottidae. It was described by Hans Rebel in 1901. It is found in Israel and Turkey.

The wingspan is 27–32 mm. The forewings are light brown with whitish veins and a broad dark brown band along the margins. The hindwings are pale brownish-grey.
