= Cathalistis bispinosa =

Scientific classification
- Kingdom: Animalia
- Phylum: Arthropoda
- Clade: Pancrustacea
- Class: Insecta
- Order: Lepidoptera
- Family: Eriocottidae
- Genus: Cathalistis
- Species: C. bispinosa

Binomial name
- Cathalistis bispinosa Mey, 2011

Species of moth

Cathalistis bispinosa is a moth in the family Eriocottidae. It was described by Wolfram Mey in 2011. It is found in Namibia.
