= Compsoctena melitoplaca =

Scientific classification
- Kingdom: Animalia
- Phylum: Arthropoda
- Clade: Pancrustacea
- Class: Insecta
- Order: Lepidoptera
- Family: Eriocottidae
- Genus: Compsoctena
- Species: C. melitoplaca

Binomial name
- Compsoctena melitoplaca (Meyrick, 1927)

Synonyms
- Melasina melitoplaca Meyrick, 1927

Species of moth

Compsoctena melitoplaca is a moth in the family Eriocottidae. It was described by Edward Meyrick in 1927. It is found in South Africa.
