= Compsoctena barbarella =

Scientific classification
- Kingdom: Animalia
- Phylum: Arthropoda
- Clade: Pancrustacea
- Class: Insecta
- Order: Lepidoptera
- Family: Eriocottidae
- Genus: Compsoctena
- Species: C. barbarella

Binomial name
- Compsoctena barbarella (Walker, 1856)

Synonyms
- Alavona barbarella Walker, 1856

Species of moth

Compsoctena barbarella is a moth in the family Eriocottidae. It was described by Francis Walker in 1856. It is found in India.

Adults are cinereous (ash-gray) fawn, the forewings with two oblique very incomplete and much interrupted bands formed by the speckles. The hindwings are cinereous.
