= Compsoctena microctenis =

Scientific classification
- Kingdom: Animalia
- Phylum: Arthropoda
- Clade: Pancrustacea
- Class: Insecta
- Order: Lepidoptera
- Family: Eriocottidae
- Genus: Compsoctena
- Species: C. microctenis

Binomial name
- Compsoctena microctenis Meyrick, 1914

Synonyms
- Melasina microctenis Meyrick, 1914; Melasina tridentifera Meyrick, 1927

Species of moth

Compsoctena microctenis is a moth in the family Eriocottidae. It was described by Edward Meyrick in 1914. It is found in South Africa, Tanzania and Zimbabwe.

The wingspan is about 24 mm. The forewings are pale ochreous, with some scattered undefined strigulae of brownish and black specks, especially in the disc and on the anterior portion of the costa. The hindwings are grey.
