= Eriocottis maraschensis =

Scientific classification
- Domain: Eukaryota
- Kingdom: Animalia
- Phylum: Arthropoda
- Class: Insecta
- Order: Lepidoptera
- Family: Eriocottidae
- Genus: Eriocottis
- Species: E. maraschensis

Binomial name
- Eriocottis maraschensis Rebel, 1936

Species of moth

Eriocottis maraschensis is a moth in the family Eriocottidae. It was described by Hans Rebel in 1936. It is found in the Taurus Mountains in Turkey.
