= Deuterotinea auronitens =

Scientific classification
- Domain: Eukaryota
- Kingdom: Animalia
- Phylum: Arthropoda
- Class: Insecta
- Order: Lepidoptera
- Family: Eriocottidae
- Genus: Deuterotinea
- Species: D. auronitens

Binomial name
- Deuterotinea auronitens D. Lucas, 1956

Species of moth

Deuterotinea auronitens is a moth in the family Eriocottidae. It was described by Daniel Lucas in 1956. It is found in Morocco.
