= Compsoctena cossinella =

Scientific classification
- Kingdom: Animalia
- Phylum: Arthropoda
- Clade: Pancrustacea
- Class: Insecta
- Order: Lepidoptera
- Family: Eriocottidae
- Genus: Compsoctena
- Species: C. cossinella

Binomial name
- Compsoctena cossinella (Walker, 1866)

Synonyms
- Alavona cossinella Walker, 1866

Species of moth

Compsoctena cossinella is a moth in the family Eriocottidae. It was described by Francis Walker in 1866. It is found in India.

Adults are whitish, the forewings very thinly brown speckled, except for two broad postmedial longitudinal streaks where the speckles are numerous. The costa has brown subquadrate marks and the exterior border has short brown streaks, which extend over the fringe. The hindwings are pale cinereous (ash grey).
