= Compsoctena pinguis =

Scientific classification
- Kingdom: Animalia
- Phylum: Arthropoda
- Clade: Pancrustacea
- Class: Insecta
- Order: Lepidoptera
- Family: Eriocottidae
- Genus: Compsoctena
- Species: C. pinguis

Binomial name
- Compsoctena pinguis (Meyrick, 1914)

Synonyms
- Melasina pinguis Meyrick, 1914; Melasina scoriopis Meyrick, 1934

Species of moth

Compsoctena pinguis is a moth in the family Eriocottidae. It was described by Edward Meyrick in 1914. It is found in Taiwan and China.

== Subspecies ==
- Compsoctena pinguis pinguis
- Compsoctena pinguis insularis Dierl, 1970 (China: Hainan)
- Compsoctena pinguis scoriopis (Meyrick, 1934) (China: Hebei)
