= Compsoctena dehradunensis =

Scientific classification
- Kingdom: Animalia
- Phylum: Arthropoda
- Clade: Pancrustacea
- Class: Insecta
- Order: Lepidoptera
- Family: Eriocottidae
- Genus: Compsoctena
- Species: C. dehradunensis

Binomial name
- Compsoctena dehradunensis Pathania & Rose, 2004

Species of moth

Compsoctena dehradunensis is a moth in the Eriocottidae family. It was described by Pathania and Rose in 2004. It is found in Uttarakhand, India.
