= Compsoctena reductella =

Scientific classification
- Kingdom: Animalia
- Phylum: Arthropoda
- Clade: Pancrustacea
- Class: Insecta
- Order: Lepidoptera
- Family: Eriocottidae
- Genus: Compsoctena
- Species: C. reductella

Binomial name
- Compsoctena reductella (Walker, 1863)

Synonyms
- Toxaliba reductella Walker, 1863; Toxaliba umbripennis Moore, 1887

Species of moth

Compsoctena reductella is a moth in the family Eriocottidae. It was described by Francis Walker in 1863. It is found in Nepal and India.
