= Crepidochares neblinae =

Scientific classification
- Kingdom: Animalia
- Phylum: Arthropoda
- Class: Insecta
- Order: Lepidoptera
- Family: Eriocottidae
- Genus: Crepidochares
- Species: C. neblinae

Binomial name
- Crepidochares neblinae Davis, 1990

Species of moth

Crepidochares neblinae is a moth in the family Eriocottidae. It was described by Donald R. Davis in 1990. It is found in Venezuela.

== Etymology ==
The species is named for Cerro de la Neblina, the type locality.
