= Compsoctena pantherina =

Scientific classification
- Kingdom: Animalia
- Phylum: Arthropoda
- Clade: Pancrustacea
- Class: Insecta
- Order: Lepidoptera
- Family: Eriocottidae
- Genus: Compsoctena
- Species: C. pantherina

Binomial name
- Compsoctena pantherina Sobczyk, 2012

Species of moth

Compsoctena pantherina is a moth in the Eriocottidae family. It was described by Sobczyk in 2012. It is found in Indonesia (Sumatra, Kalimantan).
