= Compsoctena rudis =

Scientific classification
- Kingdom: Animalia
- Phylum: Arthropoda
- Clade: Pancrustacea
- Class: Insecta
- Order: Lepidoptera
- Family: Eriocottidae
- Genus: Compsoctena
- Species: C. rudis

Binomial name
- Compsoctena rudis (Meyrick, 1921)

Synonyms
- Melasina rudis Meyrick, 1921

Species of moth

Compsoctena rudis is a moth in the family Eriocottidae. It was described by Edward Meyrick in 1921. It is found in Mozambique, South Africa and Zimbabwe.

The wingspan is 17–18 mm. The forewings are light fuscous, thinly speckled with darker and with an obscure whitish dot on the end of the cell. The hindwings are grey.
