= Compsoctena autoderma =

Scientific classification
- Kingdom: Animalia
- Phylum: Arthropoda
- Clade: Pancrustacea
- Class: Insecta
- Order: Lepidoptera
- Family: Eriocottidae
- Genus: Compsoctena
- Species: C. autoderma

Binomial name
- Compsoctena autoderma (Meyrick, 1914)

Synonyms
- Melasina autoderma Meyrick, 1914

Species of moth

Compsoctena autoderma is a moth in the family Eriocottidae. It was described by Edward Meyrick in 1914. It is found in South Africa and Zimbabwe.

The wingspan is 18–21 mm. The forewings are fuscous, or brownish ochreous tinged with fuscous, especially towards the base of the costa, usually with very indistinct scattered darker fuscous strigulae. There is a very indistinct darker fuscous transverse mark on the upper angle of the cell. The hindwings are dark fuscous.
