= Cathalistis orinephela =

Scientific classification
- Kingdom: Animalia
- Phylum: Arthropoda
- Class: Insecta
- Order: Lepidoptera
- Family: Eriocottidae
- Genus: Cathalistis
- Species: C. orinephela

Binomial name
- Cathalistis orinephela Meyrick, 1917

Species of moth

Cathalistis orinephela is a moth in the family Eriocottidae. It was described by Edward Meyrick in 1917. It is found in South Africa.

The wingspan is about 26 mm. The forewings are grey, suffusedly irrorated (sprinkled) with whitish. The hindwings are whitish grey.
