= Compsoctena scriba =

Scientific classification
- Kingdom: Animalia
- Phylum: Arthropoda
- Clade: Pancrustacea
- Class: Insecta
- Order: Lepidoptera
- Family: Eriocottidae
- Genus: Compsoctena
- Species: C. scriba

Binomial name
- Compsoctena scriba (Meyrick, 1921)

Synonyms
- Melasina scriba Meyrick, 1921

Species of moth

Compsoctena scriba is a moth in the family Eriocottidae. It was described by Edward Meyrick in 1921. It is found in Lesotho, Malawi, Mozambique, South Africa, Tanzania, Zambia and Zimbabwe.

The wingspan is about 27 mm. The forewings are grey irregularly sprinkled with whitish, transversely strigulated with dark fuscous irroration (speckles) and with a transverse strigula of blackish scales towards the dorsum at one-fourth. There is a somewhat oblique blackish strigula in the disc before the middle, and a longer more strongly reversed-oblique blackish striga at the end of the cell. The V-shaped grey space beneath the middle of the disc is also somewhat marked with black on the upper part of the sides. The hindwings are rather dark grey.
