= Eriocottis pyrocoma =

Scientific classification
- Kingdom: Animalia
- Phylum: Arthropoda
- Class: Insecta
- Order: Lepidoptera
- Family: Eriocottidae
- Genus: Eriocottis
- Species: E. pyrocoma

Binomial name
- Eriocottis pyrocoma Meyrick, 1891

Species of moth

Eriocottis pyrocoma is a moth in the family Eriocottidae. It was described by Edward Meyrick in 1891. It is found in Algeria.

The wingspan is 13–14 mm. The forewings are ochreous bronzy, posteriorly more or less irrorated (sprinkled) or wholly suffused with pale ochreous. The hindwings are dark grey.
