= Compsoctena agria =

Scientific classification
- Kingdom: Animalia
- Phylum: Arthropoda
- Clade: Pancrustacea
- Class: Insecta
- Order: Lepidoptera
- Family: Eriocottidae
- Genus: Compsoctena
- Species: C. agria

Binomial name
- Compsoctena agria (Meyrick, 1909)

Synonyms
- Melasina agria Meyrick, 1909

Species of moth

Compsoctena agria is a moth in the family Eriocottidae. It was described by Edward Meyrick in 1909. It is found in Gauteng, South Africa.

The wingspan is about 15 mm. The forewings are fuscous, sprinkled with darker and with indications of a line of dark fuscous scales from three-fifths of the costa to the tornus. The hindwings are dark fuscous.
