= Compsoctena delocrossa =

Scientific classification
- Kingdom: Animalia
- Phylum: Arthropoda
- Clade: Pancrustacea
- Class: Insecta
- Order: Lepidoptera
- Family: Eriocottidae
- Genus: Compsoctena
- Species: C. delocrossa

Binomial name
- Compsoctena delocrossa (Meyrick, 1921)

Synonyms
- Melasina delocrossa Meyrick, 1921

Species of moth

Compsoctena delocrossa is a moth in the family Eriocottidae. It was described by Edward Meyrick in 1921. It is found in South Africa and Zimbabwe.

Its wingspan is about 25 mm. The forewings are grey, with the tips of the scales dark fuscous and with irregular indistinct dark fuscous transverse striae, in the cell more broken into dots. The area of the cell and median area of the costa is somewhat suffused with darker but undefined. The hindwings are grey.
