= Eriocottis andalusiella =

Scientific classification
- Domain: Eukaryota
- Kingdom: Animalia
- Phylum: Arthropoda
- Class: Insecta
- Order: Lepidoptera
- Family: Eriocottidae
- Genus: Eriocottis
- Species: E. andalusiella

Binomial name
- Eriocottis andalusiella Rebel, 1901

Species of moth

Eriocottis andalusiella is a moth in the family Eriocottidae. It was described by Hans Rebel in 1901. It is found in Portugal and Spain.

The wingspan is 17–19 mm. The forewings are brownish, sprinkled with dark scales. The hindwings are dark greyish.
