= Deuterotinea instabilis =

Scientific classification
- Kingdom: Animalia
- Phylum: Arthropoda
- Class: Insecta
- Order: Lepidoptera
- Family: Eriocottidae
- Genus: Deuterotinea
- Species: D. instabilis

Binomial name
- Deuterotinea instabilis (Meyrick, 1924)

Synonyms
- Taleporia instabilis Meyrick, 1924

Species of moth

Deuterotinea instabilis is a moth in the family Eriocottidae. It was described by Edward Meyrick in 1924. It is found on Cyprus.

The wingspan is 26–28 mm. The forewings are fuscous, brownish, or whitish fuscous, or fuscous suffusedly irrorated (sprinkled) with white, sometimes with scattered dark fuscous scales. The costa is dotted dark fuscous on the anterior half, posteriorly with four small dark fuscous spots, which are sometimes nearly obsolete. There is a variably developed thick irregular dark fuscous streak from the base beneath the cell to the end, thence directed upwards towards the costa before the apex and sometimes reaching the fourth costal spot, sometimes sharply marked. Sometimes, there are two or three dark fuscous marginal dots around the tornus. The hindwings are light or pale grey.
