= Deuterotinea maracandica =

Scientific classification
- Domain: Eukaryota
- Kingdom: Animalia
- Phylum: Arthropoda
- Class: Insecta
- Order: Lepidoptera
- Family: Eriocottidae
- Genus: Deuterotinea
- Species: D. maracandica

Binomial name
- Deuterotinea maracandica Zagulajev, 1988

Species of moth

Deuterotinea maracandica is a moth in the Eriocottidae family. It was described by Zagulajev in 1988. It is found in Uzbekistan.
