= Tetracladessa =

Scientific classification
- Kingdom: Animalia
- Phylum: Arthropoda
- Clade: Pancrustacea
- Class: Insecta
- Order: Lepidoptera
- Family: Eriocottidae
- Genus: Tetracladessa; Gozmany & Vari, 1973
- Species: T. chalcoxesta

Binomial name
- Tetracladessa chalcoxesta (Meyrick, 1920)

Synonyms
- Tinea chalcoxesta Meyrick, 1920

Genus of moths

Tetracladessa is a monotypic moth genus in the family Eriocottidae erected by László Anthony Gozmány and Lajos Vári in 1973. Its sole species, Tetracladessa chalcoxesta, was first described by Edward Meyrick in 1920 (as Tinea chalcoxesta). It is found in South Africa.

The wingspan is about 14 mm. The forewings are light shining brassy bronze. The hindwings are light prismatic grey.
