= Eriocottis paradoxella =

Scientific classification
- Domain: Eukaryota
- Kingdom: Animalia
- Phylum: Arthropoda
- Class: Insecta
- Order: Lepidoptera
- Family: Eriocottidae
- Genus: Eriocottis
- Species: E. paradoxella

Binomial name
- Eriocottis paradoxella (Staudinger, 1859)

Synonyms
- Tinea paradoxella Staudinger, 1859; Deuterotinea paradoxella; Deuterotinea paradoxella ab. decoratella de Joannis, 1917; Deuterotinea paradoxella ab. nervatella de Joannis, 1917

Species of moth

Eriocottis paradoxella is a moth in the family Eriocottidae. It was described by Otto Staudinger in 1859. It is found in France, Spain and Portugal.
