= Rhodobates canariensis =

Scientific classification
- Kingdom: Animalia
- Phylum: Arthropoda
- Clade: Pancrustacea
- Class: Insecta
- Order: Lepidoptera
- Family: Tineidae
- Genus: Rhodobates
- Species: R. canariensis

Binomial name
- Rhodobates canariensis Petersen & Gaedike, 1979

Species of moth

Rhodobates canariensis is a species of moth of the family Tineidae. It was described by Petersen and Gaedike in 1979. It is found on the Canary Islands.

The wingspan is about 20 mm.
