= Rhodobates =

Scientific classification
- Kingdom: Animalia
- Phylum: Arthropoda
- Clade: Pancrustacea
- Class: Insecta
- Order: Lepidoptera
- Family: Tineidae
- Subfamily: Myrmecozelinae
- Genus: Rhodobates; Ragonot, 1895

Synonyms
- "Phaulogenes" Meyrick, 1938

Genus of moths

Rhodobates is a genus of moths belonging to the family Tineidae. The genus was first described by Ragonot in 1895.

== Species ==
Rhodobates includes the following species:

- Rhodobates algiricella Rebel 1900
- Rhodobates amorphopa Meyrick, 1938
- Rhodobates canariensis Petersen & Gaedike 1979
- Rhodobates emorsus Gozmány 1967
- Rhodobates friedeli Petersen 1987
- Rhodobates laevigatellus Herrich-Schäffer 1854
- Rhodobates nodicornella Rebel 1911
- Rhodobates pallipalpellus Rebel 1901
- Rhodobates paracosma Meyrick
- Rhodobates unicolor Staudinger, 1871
