= Cathalistis =

Scientific classification
- Kingdom: Animalia
- Phylum: Arthropoda
- Class: Insecta
- Order: Lepidoptera
- Family: Eriocottidae
- Genus: Cathalistis; Meyrick, 1917

Synonyms
- Catalists T. B. Fletcher, 1929

Genus of moths

Cathalistis is a genus of moths in the family Eriocottidae described by Edward Meyrick in 1917.

== Species ==
- Cathalistis bispinosa Mey, 2011
- Cathalistis orinephela Meyrick, 1917
- Cathalistis secularis (Meyrick, 1918)

== Taxonomy ==
László Anthony Gozmány and Lajos Vári transferred the genus to Psychidae, subfamily Taleporiinae in 1973. Wolfram Mey transferred it to Eriocottidae, subfamily Compsocteninae in 2011.
