= Dacryphanes =

Scientific classification
- Kingdom: Animalia
- Phylum: Arthropoda
- Class: Insecta
- Order: Lepidoptera
- Family: Eriocottidae
- Genus: Dacryphanes; Meyrick, 1907
- Species: D. cyanastra

Binomial name
- Dacryphanes cyanastra Meyrick, 1907

Genus of moths

Dacryphanes is a monotypic moth genus in the family Eriocottidae. Its only species, Dacryphanes cyanastra, is found in India. Both the genus and species were first described by Edward Meyrick in 1907.

The moth is 15–18 mm. The forewings are dark fuscous with six indeterminate groups of blue-metallic or violet-metallic dots, sometimes surrounded by an indefinite cloudy paler suffusion. The hindwings are rather dark bronzy fuscous, darker towards apex.
