= Compsoctena =

Scientific classification
- Kingdom: Animalia
- Phylum: Arthropoda
- Clade: Pancrustacea
- Class: Insecta
- Order: Lepidoptera
- Family: Eriocottidae
- Genus: Compsoctena; Zeller, 1852

Synonyms
- Alavona Walker, 1863; Eccompsoctena Walsingham, 1897; Galaria Walker, 1866; Melasiniana Strand, 1914; Thapava Walker, 1864; Tissa Walker, 1863; Torna Walker, 1863; Toxaliba Walker, 1863

Genus of moths

Compsoctena is a genus of moths in the family Eriocottidae. It was erected by Philipp Christoph Zeller in 1852.

== Species ==
- Compsoctena aedifica Meyrick, 1908
- Compsoctena aethalea Meyrick, 1907
- Compsoctena africanella Strand, 1909
- Compsoctena agria Meyrick, 1909
- Compsoctena araeopis Meyrick, 1926
- Compsoctena autoderma Meyrick, 1914
- Compsoctena barbarella Walker, 1856
- Compsoctena brachyctenis Meyrick, 1909
- Compsoctena brandbergensis Mey, 2007
- Compsoctena byrseis (Meyrick, 1934)
- Compsoctena connexalis Walker, 1863
- Compsoctena cossinella Walker, 1866
- Compsoctena cossusella Walker, 1856
- Compsoctena cyclatma Meyrick, 1908
- Compsoctena dehradunensis Pathania & Rose, 2004
- Compsoctena delocrossa Meyrick, 1921
- Compsoctena dermatodes Meyrick, 1914
- Compsoctena expers Meyrick, 1911
- Compsoctena fossoria Meyrick, 1920
- Compsoctena furciformis Meyrick, 1921
- Compsoctena himachalensis Pathania & Rose, 2004
- Compsoctena indecorella Walker, 1856
- Compsoctena intermediella Walker, 1866
- Compsoctena invariella Walker, 1863
- Compsoctena isopetra Meyrick, 1921
- Compsoctena kaokoveldi Mey, 2011
- Compsoctena leucoconis Meyrick, 1926
- Compsoctena lycophanes Meyrick, 1924
- Compsoctena media Walsingham, 1897
- Compsoctena melitoplaca Meyrick, 1927
- Compsoctena microctenis Meyrick, 1914
- Compsoctena minor Walsingham, 1866
- Compsoctena montana Dierl, 1970
- Compsoctena niphocosma (Meyrick, 1934)
- Compsoctena numeraria Meyrick, 1914
- Compsoctena ochrastis Meyrick, 1937
- Compsoctena ostracitis Meyrick, 1913
- Compsoctena pantherina Sobczyk, 2012
- Compsoctena pinguis Meyrick, 1914
- Compsoctena primella Zeller, 1852
- Compsoctena psammosticha Meyrick, 1921
- Compsoctena quassa Meyrick, 1921
- Compsoctena reductella Walker, 1863
- Compsoctena robinsoni Pathania & Rose, 2004
- Compsoctena rudis Meyrick, 1921
- Compsoctena rustica Strand, 1914
- Compsoctena scriba Meyrick, 1921
- Compsoctena secundella Walsingham, 1897
- Compsoctena similis Dierl, 1970
- Compsoctena spilophanes Meyrick, 1921
- Compsoctena susurrans (Meyrick, 1911)
- Compsoctena talarodes Meyrick, 1927
- Compsoctena taprobana Walsingham, 1887
- Compsoctena terrestris Meyrick, 1914
- Compsoctena thwaitesii Walsingham, 1887
- Compsoctena ursulella Walker, 1863
- Compsoctena vilis Walker, 1865
