= Crepidochares =

Scientific classification
- Kingdom: Animalia
- Phylum: Arthropoda
- Class: Insecta
- Order: Lepidoptera
- Family: Eriocottidae
- Genus: Crepidochares; Meyrick, 1922

Genus of moths

Crepidochares is a genus of moths in the family Eriocottidae.

== Species ==
- Crepidochares aridula Davis, 1990 (from Chile)
- Crepidochares austrina Davis, 1990 (from Chile)
- Crepidochares colombiae Davis, 1990 (from Colombia)
- Crepidochares neblinae Davis, 1990
- Crepidochares subtigrina Meyrick, 1922 (from Brazil)
