= Rhodobates unicolor =

Scientific classification
- Kingdom: Animalia
- Phylum: Arthropoda
- Class: Insecta
- Order: Lepidoptera
- Family: Tineidae
- Genus: Rhodobates
- Species: R. unicolor

Binomial name
- Rhodobates unicolor (Staudinger, 1870)

Synonyms
- Morophaga unicolor Staudinger, 1870; Myrmecozela tibulella Rebel, 1936

Species of moth

Rhodobates unicolor is a moth of the family Tineidae. It was described by Otto Staudinger in 1870. It is found in France, Spain, Italy and Greece.
