= Cathalistis secularis =

Scientific classification
- Kingdom: Animalia
- Phylum: Arthropoda
- Clade: Pancrustacea
- Class: Insecta
- Order: Lepidoptera
- Family: Eriocottidae
- Genus: Cathalistis
- Species: C. secularis

Binomial name
- Cathalistis secularis (Meyrick, 1918)

Synonyms
- Eucryptogona secularis Meyrick, 1918

Species of moth

Cathalistis secularis is a moth in the family Eriocottidae. It was described by Edward Meyrick in 1918. It is found in South Africa, where it has been recorded from Gauteng.

The wingspan is about 28 mm. The forewings are light brownish, with some irregular dark brownish sprinkling and an irregular waved cloudy subterminal shade of dark brown irroration (sprinkles) from the costa to beneath the angle of the cell. The hindwings are pale grey.
