= Rhodobates nodicornella =

Scientific classification
- Kingdom: Animalia
- Phylum: Arthropoda
- Class: Insecta
- Order: Lepidoptera
- Family: Tineidae
- Genus: Rhodobates
- Species: R. nodicornella

Binomial name
- Rhodobates nodicornella (Rebel, 1911)

Synonyms
- Eriocottis nodicornella Rebel, 1911; Rhodobates nodicornella

Species of moth

Rhodobates nodicornella is a moth of the family Tineidae first described by Hans Rebel in 1911. It is found in Lebanon and Jordan.
