= Eriocottidae =

Scientific classification
- Kingdom: Animalia
- Phylum: Arthropoda
- Clade: Pancrustacea
- Class: Insecta
- Order: Lepidoptera
- Clade: Neolepidoptera
- Infraorder: Heteroneura
- Clade: Eulepidoptera
- Clade: Ditrysia
- Superfamily: Tineoidea
- Family: Eriocottidae; Spuler, 1898

Diversity
- About 6 genera and 80 species

Synonyms
- Deuterotineidae Zagulajev 1973; Compsoctenidae Dierl, 1970

Family of moths

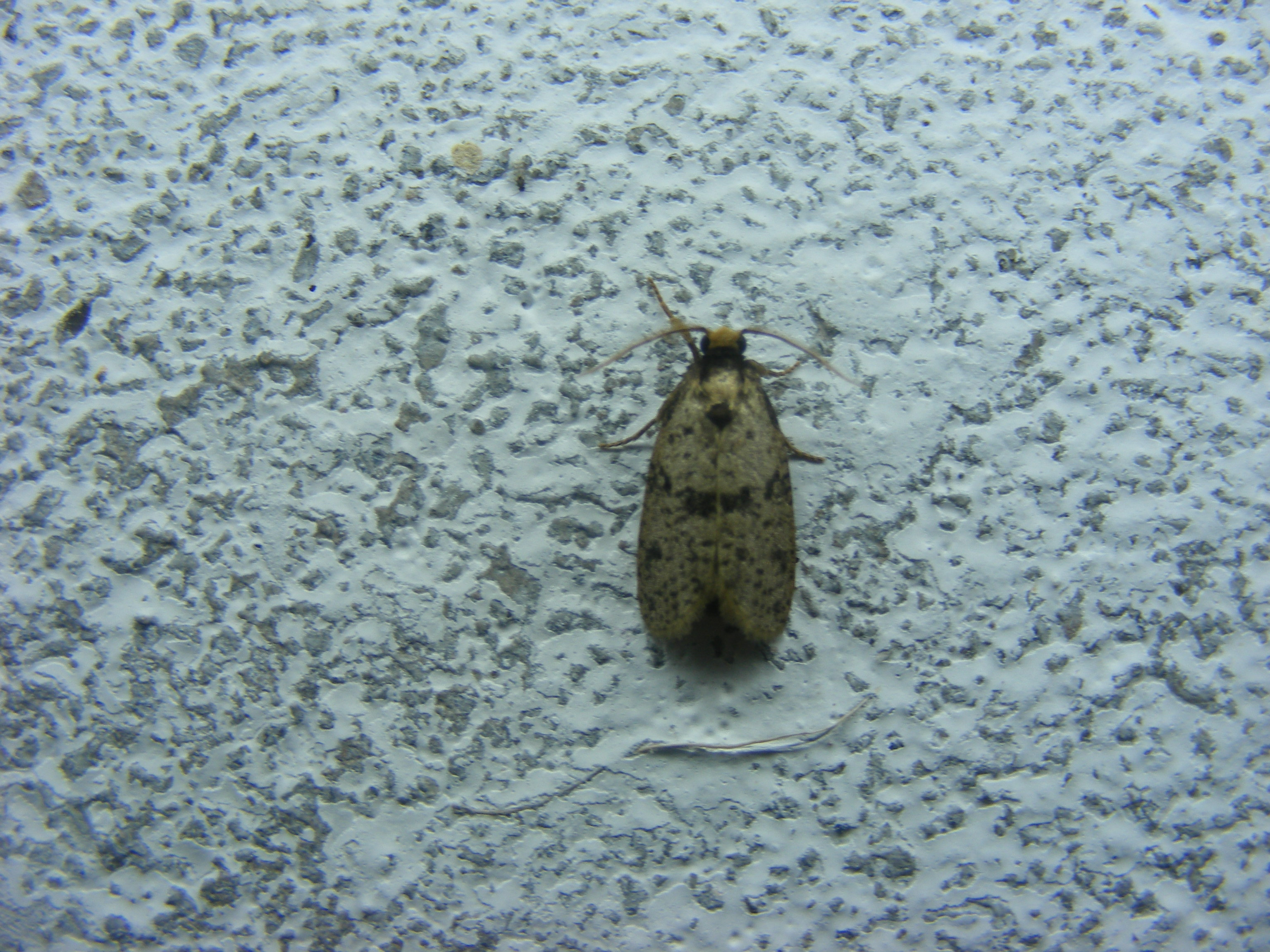
Eriocottidae

Eriocottidae or Old World spiny-winged moths is a family of insects in the order Lepidoptera whose position relative to other members of the superfamily Tineoidea is currently unknown. There are two subfamilies, Compsocteninae and Eriocottinae.

== Systematics ==
- Eriocottinae Spuler, 1898
  - Crepidochares Meyrick, 1922
  - Dacryphanes Meyrick, 1908
  - Deuterotinea Rebel, 1901
  - Eriocottis Zeller, 1847
  - Tetracladessa Gozmány & Vári, 1975
- Compsocteninae Dierl, 1970
  - Cathalistis Meyrick, 1917
  - Compsoctena Zeller, 1852
  - Filiramifera Mey, 2019
  - Kruegerellus Mey & Sobczyk, 2019
  - Eocompsoctena Ngo-Muller, Engel, Nel, & Nel, 2020
  - Eucryptogona Lower, 1901
  - Picrospora Meyrick, 1912

== Former genera ==
- Picrospora (transferred to Psychidae, but see Mey, 2011, for placement in Eriocottidae)
