= Artifex =

Artifex may refer to:

== Biology ==
- Artifex (spider), a South Pacific genus of spiders
- Cecidoses artifex, a moth of the family Cecidosidae
- Exoletuncus artifex, a species of moth of the family Tortricidae
- Pisidium artifex, a species of freshwater clam in the family Sphaeriidae

== Other uses ==
- HMS Artifex (F28), a repair ship of the Royal Navy
- Artifex Gallery, an art gallery in Taos, New Mexico
- Artifex Software, an American company developing Ghostscript and MuPDF software
- Artifex, a 2025 album by Ancient Bards
