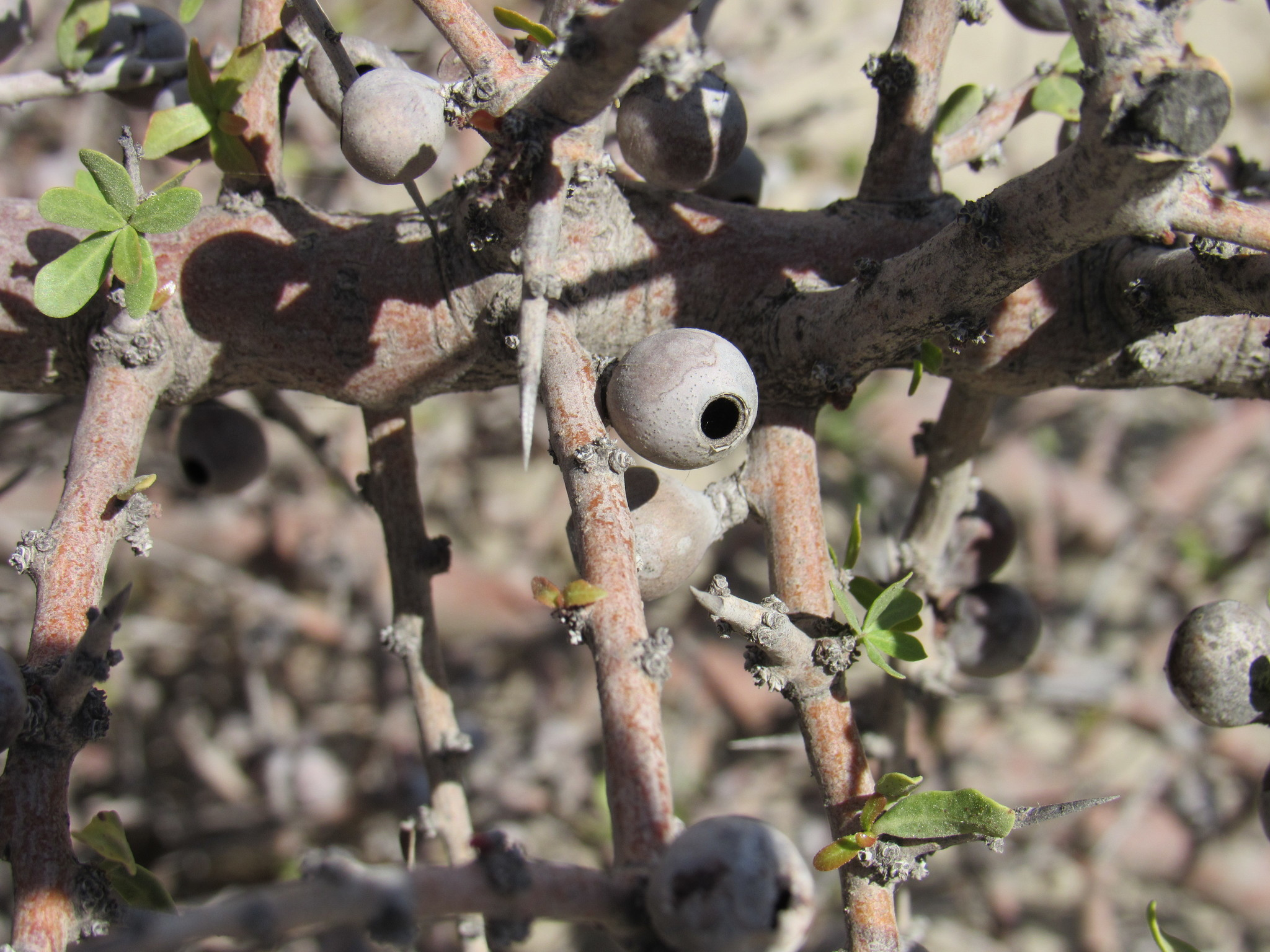
- Stem galls caused by Cecidoses minutanus

Scientific classification
- Kingdom: Animalia
- Phylum: Arthropoda
- Clade: Pancrustacea
- Class: Insecta
- Order: Lepidoptera
- Family: Cecidosidae
- Genus: Cecidoses
- Species: C. minutanus

Binomial name
- Cecidoses minutanus (Brèthes, 1917)

Synonyms
- Eucecidoses minutanus Brèthes, 1917

= Cecidoses minutanus =

Species of moth

Cecidoses minutanus is a species of moth in the family Cecidosidae. It was first described by Juan Brèthes in 1917. It is found in Argentina.
