= Scyrotis trivialis =

Scientific classification
- Kingdom: Animalia
- Phylum: Arthropoda
- Class: Insecta
- Order: Lepidoptera
- Family: Cecidosidae
- Genus: Scyrotis
- Species: S. trivialis

Binomial name
- Scyrotis trivialis (Meyrick, 1913)

Synonyms
- Ptisanora trivialis Meyrick, 1913; Sapheneutis diplopsamma Meyrick, 1918; Liopseustis planicola Meyrick, 1928

Species of moth

Scyrotis trivialis is a species of moth of the family Cecidosidae. It is found in South Africa.
