= Scyrotis alticolaria =

Scientific classification
- Kingdom: Animalia
- Phylum: Arthropoda
- Clade: Pancrustacea
- Class: Insecta
- Order: Lepidoptera
- Family: Cecidosidae
- Genus: Scyrotis
- Species: S. alticolaria

Binomial name
- Scyrotis alticolaria Mey, 2007

Species of moth

Scyrotis alticolaria is a species of moth of the family Cecidosidae. It is found in Namibia.
