= Scyrotis athleta =

Scientific classification
- Kingdom: Animalia
- Phylum: Arthropoda
- Class: Insecta
- Order: Lepidoptera
- Family: Cecidosidae
- Genus: Scyrotis
- Species: S. athleta

Binomial name
- Scyrotis athleta Meyrick, 1909

Species of moth

Scyrotis athleta is a species of moth of the family Cecidosidae. It is found in South Africa.
