= Cecidoses argentinana =

Scientific classification
- Domain: Eukaryota
- Kingdom: Animalia
- Phylum: Arthropoda
- Class: Insecta
- Order: Lepidoptera
- Family: Cecidosidae
- Genus: Cecidoses
- Species: C. argentinana

Binomial name
- Cecidoses argentinana Brèthes, 1917

Synonyms
- Oliera argentinana Brèthes, 1916

Species of moth

Cecidoses argentinana is a moth of the family Cecidosidae. It was described by Juan Brèthes in 1917. They are known for their particularly deep colours and their tendency to investigate intruders to their territory. It is found in South America.
