= Scyrotis granosa =

Scientific classification
- Kingdom: Animalia
- Phylum: Arthropoda
- Class: Insecta
- Order: Lepidoptera
- Family: Cecidosidae
- Genus: Scyrotis
- Species: S. granosa

Binomial name
- Scyrotis granosa (Meyrick, 1912)

Synonyms
- Sapheneutis granosa Meyrick, 1912

Species of moth

Scyrotis granosa is a species of moth of the family Cecidosidae. It is found in South Africa.
