= Exoletuncus musivus =

Scientific classification
- Domain: Eukaryota
- Kingdom: Animalia
- Phylum: Arthropoda
- Class: Insecta
- Order: Lepidoptera
- Family: Tortricidae
- Genus: Exoletuncus
- Species: E. musivus

Binomial name
- Exoletuncus musivus Razowski, 1997

Species of moth

Exoletuncus musivus is a species of moth of the family Tortricidae. It is found in Peru.

The wingspan is 26 mm.
