= Exoletuncus =

Scientific classification
- Kingdom: Animalia
- Phylum: Arthropoda
- Class: Insecta
- Order: Lepidoptera
- Family: Tortricidae
- Tribe: Euliini
- Genus: Exoletuncus; Razowski, 1988

Genus of tortrix moths

Exoletuncus is a genus of moths belonging to the family Tortricidae.

== Species ==
- Exoletuncus angulatus Razowski & Pelz, 2005
- Exoletuncus aquilus Razowski & Pelz, 2005
- Exoletuncus artifex Razowski, 1997
- Exoletuncus atalodes (Meyrick, 1917)
- Exoletuncus canescens Razowski & Pelz, 2005
- Exoletuncus consertus Razowski, 1997
- Exoletuncus cretatus Razowski, 1997
- Exoletuncus exoristus Razowski, 1988
- Exoletuncus guacamayosensis Razowski & Pelz, 2005
- Exoletuncus lobopus Razowski & Becker, 2002
- Exoletuncus multimaculatus Razowski & Becker, 2002
- Exoletuncus musivus Razowski, 1997
- Exoletuncus nivesanus Razowski, 1999
- Exoletuncus paraquilus Razowski & Pelz, 2005
- Exoletuncus pleregraptus Razowski & Pelz, 2005
- Exoletuncus similis Razowski & Pelz, 2005
- Exoletuncus trilobopa (Meyrick, 1926)
- Exoletuncus unguiculus Razowski & Wojtusiak, 2010

== See also ==
- List of Tortricidae genera
