= Exoletuncus trilobopus =

Scientific classification
- Domain: Eukaryota
- Kingdom: Animalia
- Phylum: Arthropoda
- Class: Insecta
- Order: Lepidoptera
- Family: Tortricidae
- Genus: Exoletuncus
- Species: E. trilobopus

Binomial name
- Exoletuncus trilobopus (Meyrick, 1926)

Synonyms
- Eulia trilobopa Meyrick, 1926; Clarkenia trilobopa; Eulia triloba Clarke, 1958

Species of moth

Exoletuncus trilobopus is a species of moth of the family Tortricidae. It is found in Rio Grande do Sul, Brazil.

The wingspan is 24 mm.
