= Cecidoses =

Scientific classification
- Domain: Eukaryota
- Kingdom: Animalia
- Phylum: Arthropoda
- Class: Insecta
- Order: Lepidoptera
- Family: Cecidosidae
- Genus: Cecidoses; Curtis, 1835

Synonyms
- Oliera ?

Genus of moths

Cecidoses is a genus of moth in the family Cecidosidae.

== Species ==
- Cecidoses argentinana
- Cecidoses eremita
- Cecidoses minutanus
