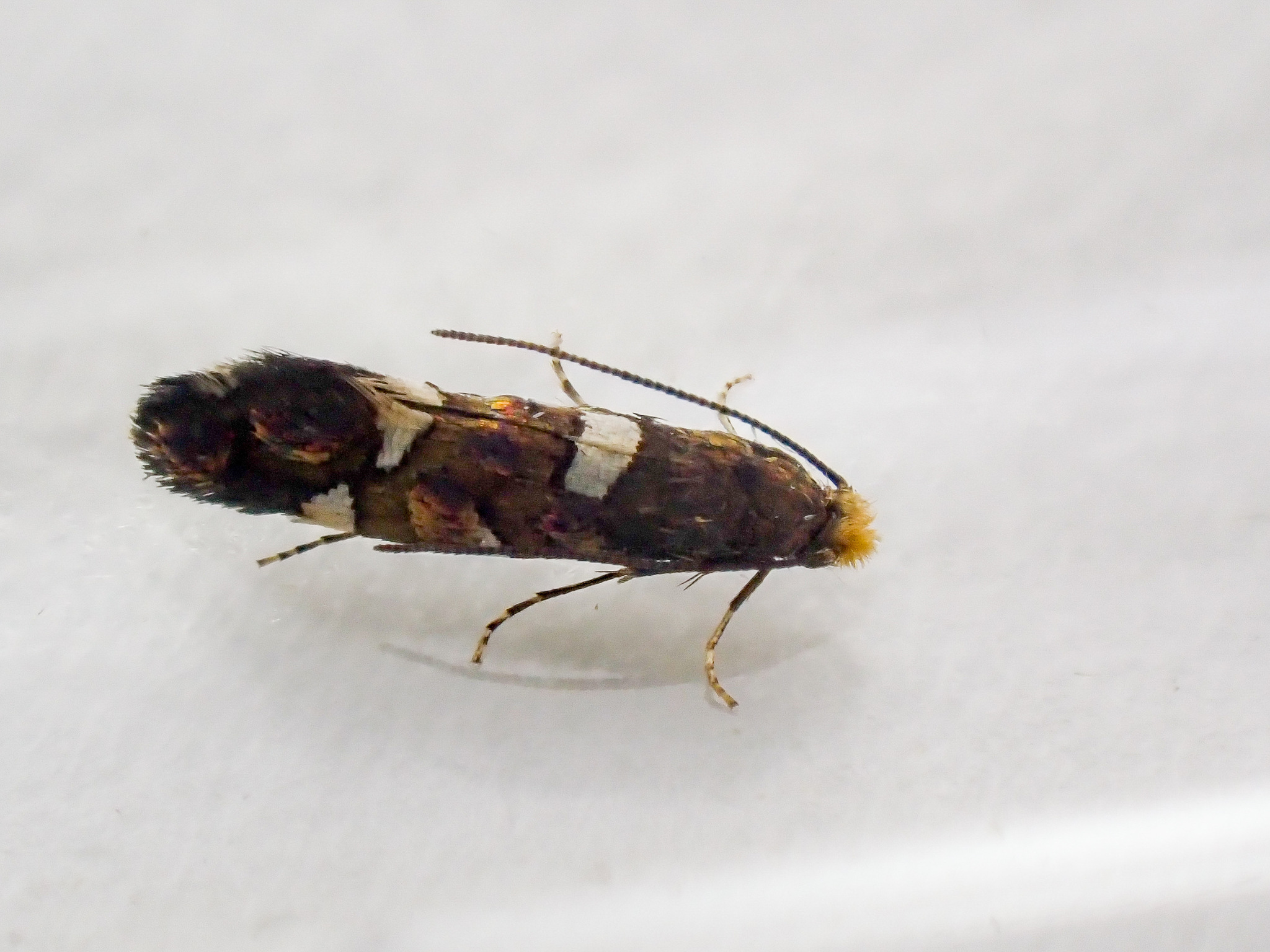
- Female Xanadoses nielseni

Scientific classification
- Kingdom: Animalia
- Phylum: Arthropoda
- Class: Insecta
- Order: Lepidoptera
- Family: Cecidosidae
- Genus: Xanadoses; Hoare & Dugdale, 2003
- Species: X. nielseni

Binomial name
- Xanadoses nielseni Hoare & Dugdale, 2003

= Xanadoses =

Genus of moths

Xanadoses is a monotypic moth genus in the family Cecidosidae. It contains a single species, Xanadoses nielseni, which is endemic to New Zealand and is found in the North and South Islands. X. nielseni is also known by the common name Kamahi bark scribbler. The larval host of this species is Pterophylla sylvicola, Pterophylla sylvicola, Nothofagus fusca, Myrsine salicina, and Quintinia serrata. The larvae mine the bark of the tree leaving "scribble" patterns in the bark.

== Taxonomy ==
This genus and the species X. nielseni were first described by Robert J. B. Hoare and John S. Dugdale in 2003. The species is named in honour of Ebbe Nielsen. The male holotype specimen, collected as a pupa at Mount Ngongotahā, is held in the New Zealand Arthropod Collection.

== Description ==
X. nielseni is a small, dark coloured moth with dark metallic highlights along with pale whitish patches on its wings. The female has a wingspan of 9.5 mm while the male is slightly larger with a wingspan of 10.5 mm. The larva is coloured a white shade with a brown head and is 4.75 mm in length just prior to pupating. The pupa is light brown in colour and slender in shape.

Life stages
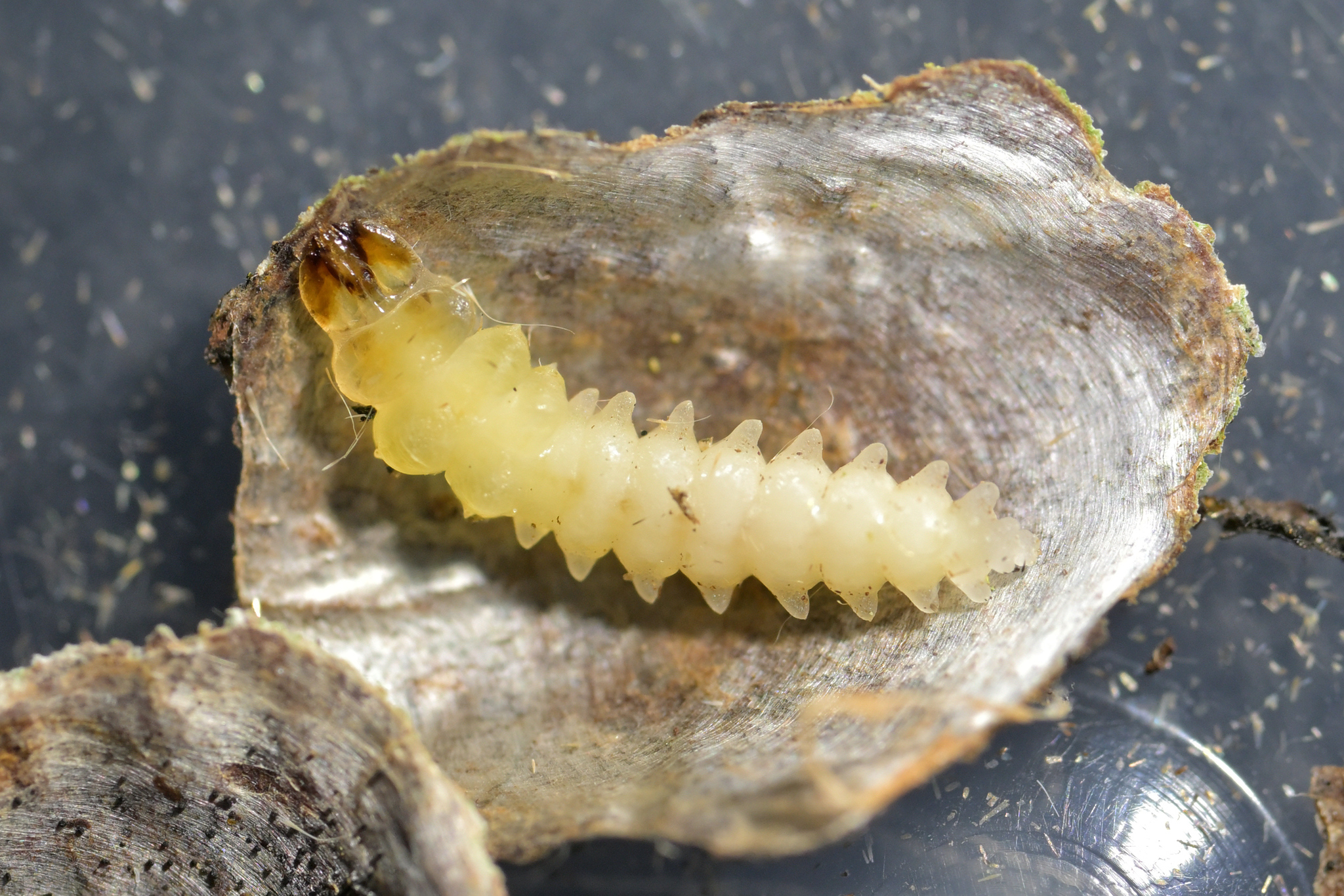
Larva

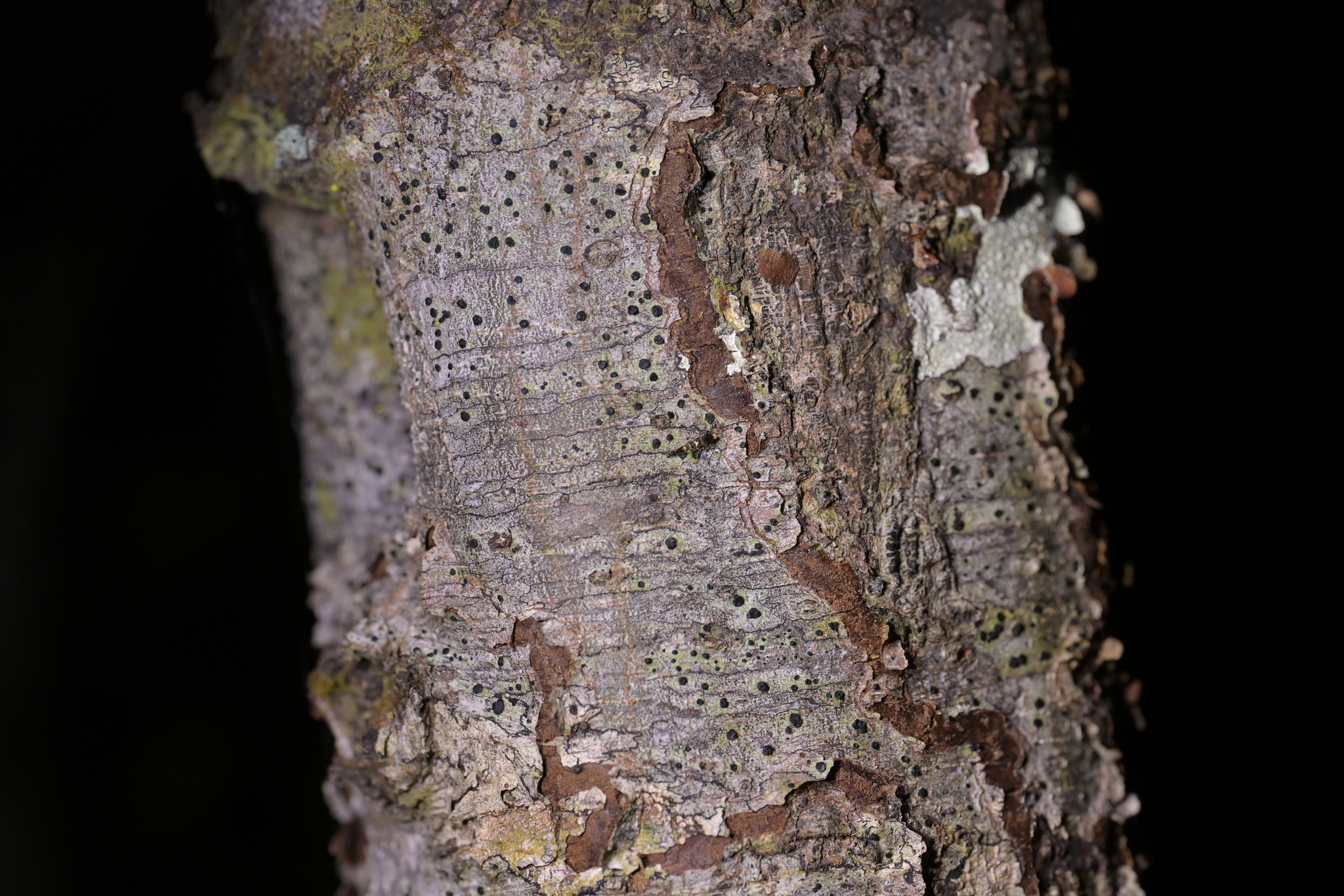
Scribble on tree left by larva

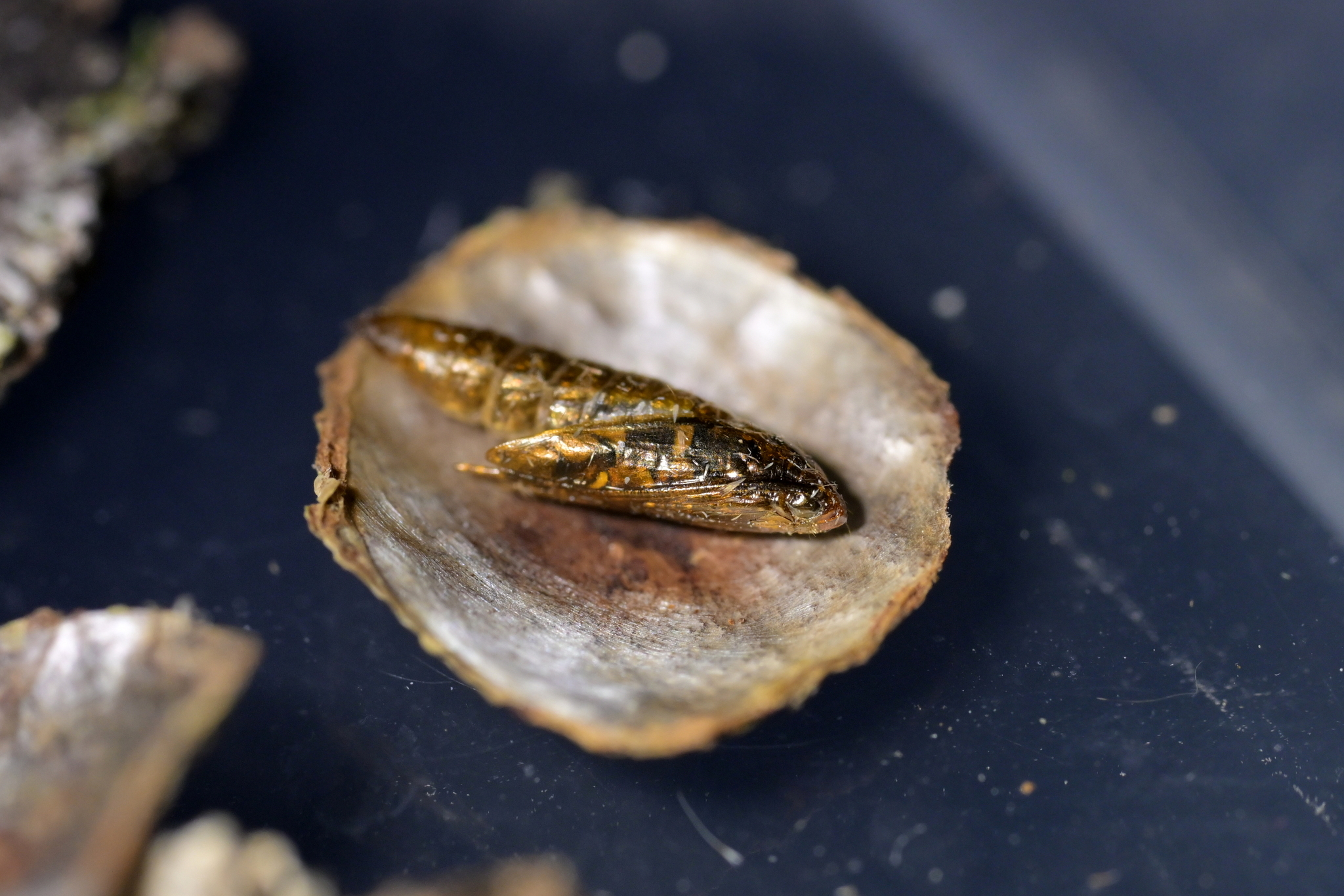
Pupa

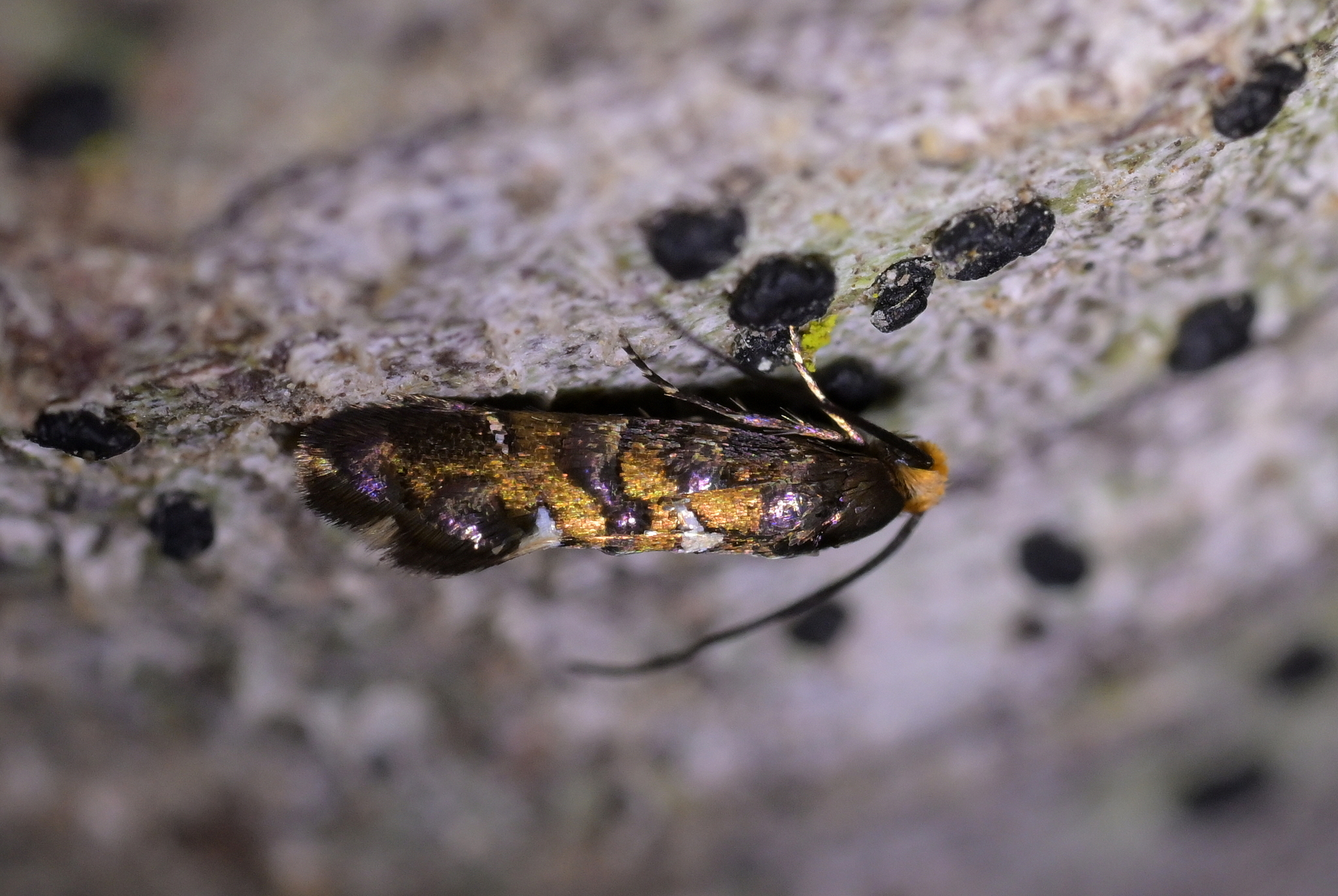
Adult

== Distribution ==
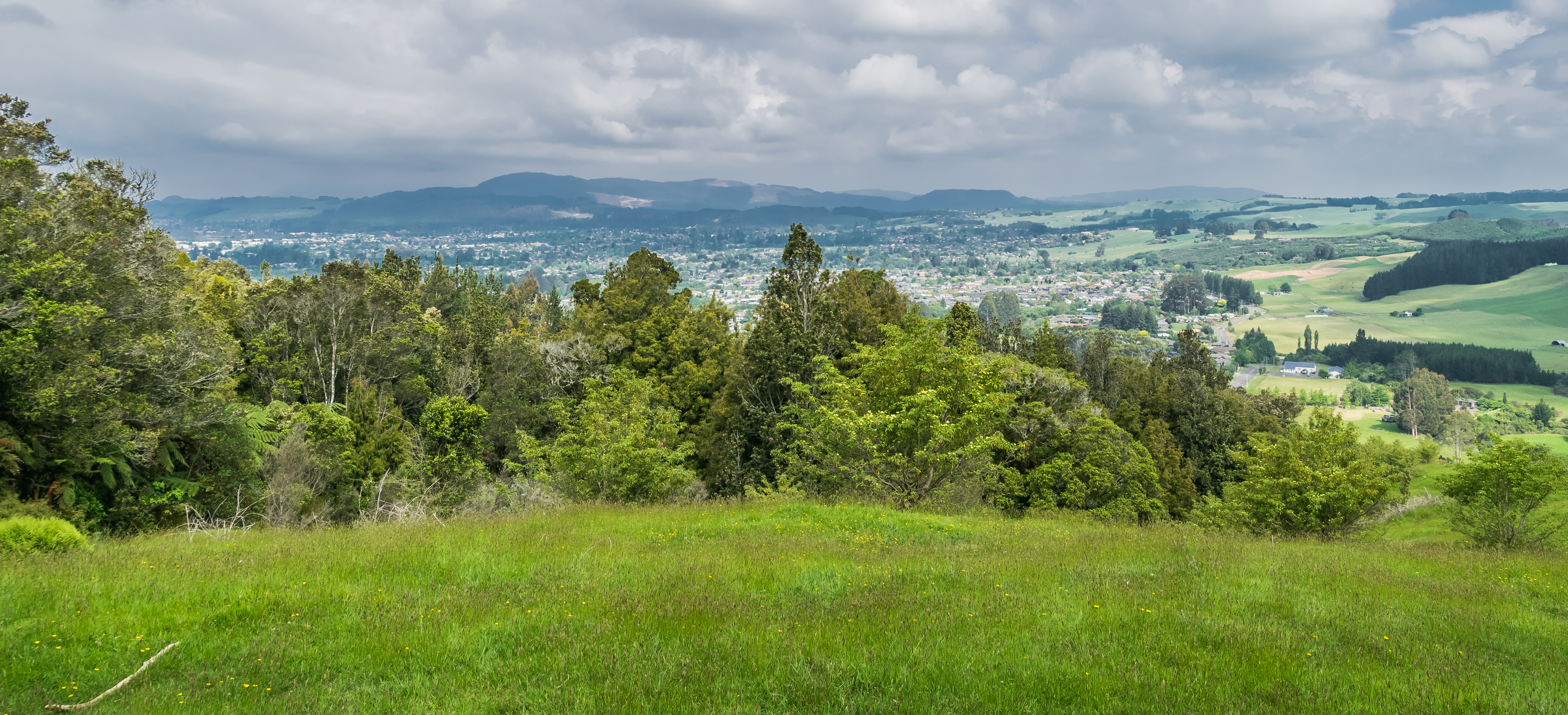
Mount Ngongotahā, the type locality for X. nielseni.

This species is endemic to New Zealand. It has been collected in the North and South Islands including in the Bay of Plenty and the Nelson regions.

== Behaviour ==
Adults have been observed on the wing from August to December. This species pupates inside the bark of its host tree forming a bulge in the bark at the end of a mine. The interior of the bulge is lined with silk.

== Host species ==
The larvae of this moth mine the bark of host plants Weinmannia racemosa, W. silvicola, Nothofagus fusca, Myrsine salicina, and Quintinia serrata, resulting in "scribble" patterns being formed on the bark of these trees. It has also been hypothesised that Knightia excelsa may also be a larval host of X. nielseni.
