= Exoletuncus unguiculus =

Scientific classification
- Domain: Eukaryota
- Kingdom: Animalia
- Phylum: Arthropoda
- Class: Insecta
- Order: Lepidoptera
- Family: Tortricidae
- Genus: Exoletuncus
- Species: E. unguiculus

Binomial name
- Exoletuncus unguiculus Razowski & Wojtusiak, 2010

Species of moth

Exoletuncus unguiculus is a species of moth of the family Tortricidae. It is found in Peru.

The wingspan is 23 mm.
