= Cecidoses eremita =

Scientific classification
- Domain: Eukaryota
- Kingdom: Animalia
- Phylum: Arthropoda
- Class: Insecta
- Order: Lepidoptera
- Family: Cecidosidae
- Genus: Cecidoses
- Species: C. eremita

Binomial name
- Cecidoses eremita Curtis, 1835

Synonyms
- Clistoses artifex Kieffer & Jörgensen, 1910

Species of moth

Cecidoses eremita is a moth of the family Cecidosidae. It was described by John Curtis in 1835. It is found in South America, including Uruguay and Argentina.

The larvae feed on Schinus longifolius. They create galls.
