= Dicranoses =

Scientific classification
- Domain: Eukaryota
- Kingdom: Animalia
- Phylum: Arthropoda
- Class: Insecta
- Order: Lepidoptera
- Family: Cecidosidae
- Genus: Dicranoses; Kieffer & Jörgensen, 1910
- Species: D. capsulifex

Binomial name
- Dicranoses capsulifex Kieffer & Jörgensen, 1910

Genus of moths

Dicranoses is a genus of moth in the family Cecidosidae. It contains the single species Dicranoses capsulifex.
