= Exoletuncus multimaculatus =

Scientific classification
- Kingdom: Animalia
- Phylum: Arthropoda
- Clade: Pancrustacea
- Class: Insecta
- Order: Lepidoptera
- Family: Tortricidae
- Genus: Exoletuncus
- Species: E. multimaculatus

Binomial name
- Exoletuncus multimaculatus Razowski & Becker, 2002

Species of moth

Exoletuncus multimaculatus is a species of moth of the family Tortricidae. It is found in Carchi Province, Ecuador.

The wingspan is 25 mm (0.98 in).
