= Ridiaschina =

Scientific classification
- Domain: Eukaryota
- Kingdom: Animalia
- Phylum: Arthropoda
- Class: Insecta
- Order: Lepidoptera
- Family: Cecidosidae
- Genus: Ridiaschina; Brèthes, 1916
- Species: R. congregatella

Binomial name
- Ridiaschina congregatella Brèthes, 1917

Genus of moths

Ridiaschina is a monotypic moth genus in the family Cecidosidae described by Juan Brèthes in 1916. Its only species, Ridiaschina congregatella, described by the same author one year later, is found in Argentina.
