= Scyrotis =

Scientific classification
- Domain: Eukaryota
- Kingdom: Animalia
- Phylum: Arthropoda
- Class: Insecta
- Order: Lepidoptera
- Family: Cecidosidae
- Genus: Scyrotis; Meyrick, 1909

Synonyms
- Liopseustis Meyrick, 1928; Ptisanora Meyrick, 1913

Genus of moths

Scyrotis is a genus of moths in the family Cecidosidae.

== Species ==
- Scyrotis alticolaria Mey, 2007
- Scyrotis athleta Meyrick, 1909
- Scyrotis brandbergensis Mey, 2007
- Scyrotis granosa (Meyrick, 1912)
- Scyrotis kochi Mey, 2007
- Scyrotis matoposensis Mey, 2007
- Scyrotis namakarooensis Mey, 2007
- Scyrotis pulleni Mey, 2007
- Scyrotis trivialis (Meyrick, 1913)
