= Exoletuncus guacamayosensis =

Scientific classification
- Kingdom: Animalia
- Phylum: Arthropoda
- Class: Insecta
- Order: Lepidoptera
- Family: Tortricidae
- Genus: Exoletuncus
- Species: E. guacamayosensis

Binomial name
- Exoletuncus guacamayosensis Razowski & Pelz, 2005

Species of moth

Exoletuncus guacamayosensis is a species of moth of the family Tortricidae. It is found in Napo Province, Ecuador.
