= Exoletuncus lobopus =

Scientific classification
- Kingdom: Animalia
- Phylum: Arthropoda
- Clade: Pancrustacea
- Class: Insecta
- Order: Lepidoptera
- Family: Tortricidae
- Genus: Exoletuncus
- Species: E. lobopus

Binomial name
- Exoletuncus lobopus Razowski & Becker, 2002

Species of moth

Exoletuncus lobopus is a species of moth of the family Tortricidae. It is found in Goiás, Brazil.

The wingspan is 17 mm (0.67 in).
