= Exoletuncus atalodes =

Scientific classification
- Domain: Eukaryota
- Kingdom: Animalia
- Phylum: Arthropoda
- Class: Insecta
- Order: Lepidoptera
- Family: Tortricidae
- Genus: Exoletuncus
- Species: E. atalodes

Binomial name
- Exoletuncus atalodes (Meyrick, 1917)

Synonyms
- Eulia atalodes Meyrick, 1917

Species of moth

Exoletuncus atalodes is a species of moth of the family Tortricidae. It is found in Colombia.
