= Exoletuncus exoristus =

Scientific classification
- Domain: Eukaryota
- Kingdom: Animalia
- Phylum: Arthropoda
- Class: Insecta
- Order: Lepidoptera
- Family: Tortricidae
- Genus: Exoletuncus
- Species: E. exoristus

Binomial name
- Exoletuncus exoristus Razowski, 1988

Species of moth

Exoletuncus exoristus is a species of moth of the family Tortricidae. It is found in Colombia.
