= Exoletuncus nivesanus =

Scientific classification
- Domain: Eukaryota
- Kingdom: Animalia
- Phylum: Arthropoda
- Class: Insecta
- Order: Lepidoptera
- Family: Tortricidae
- Genus: Exoletuncus
- Species: E. nivesanus

Binomial name
- Exoletuncus nivesanus Razowski, 1999

Species of moth

Exoletuncus nivesanus is a species of moth of the family Tortricidae. It is found in Azuay Province, Ecuador.
