= Exoletuncus artifex =

Scientific classification
- Domain: Eukaryota
- Kingdom: Animalia
- Phylum: Arthropoda
- Class: Insecta
- Order: Lepidoptera
- Family: Tortricidae
- Genus: Exoletuncus
- Species: E. artifex

Binomial name
- Exoletuncus artifex Razowski, 1997

Species of moth

Exoletuncus artifex is a species of moth of the family Tortricidae. It is found in Peru.

The wingspan is 20 mm.
