= Artifex (spider) =

Scientific classification
- Kingdom: Animalia
- Phylum: Arthropoda
- Subphylum: Chelicerata
- Class: Arachnida
- Order: Araneae
- Infraorder: Araneomorphae
- Family: Araneidae
- Genus: Artifex; Kallal & Hormiga, 2018

Type species
- Epeira melanopyga (L. Koch, 1871)

Species
- Artifex joannae (Berland, 1924); Artifex melanopyga (L. Koch, 1871)

Genus of spiders

Artifex is a small genus of orb-weaver spiders native to tropical regions of mainland Australia and to New Caledonia. The genus was erected by R. J. Kallal and Gustavo Hormiga in 2018 to contain two species moved from different genera that have several synapomorphies, including an abdomen that extends past the spinnerets, widely separated spermathecae, and dorsal markings similar to those of Zygiellinae. The name is a combination of the Latin "ars", meaning "art", and "-fex", meaning "maker" in reference to the shelters they build out of leaves.

As of November 2026 it contains only two species: A. joannae and A. melanopyga.

== See also ==
- Phonognatha
