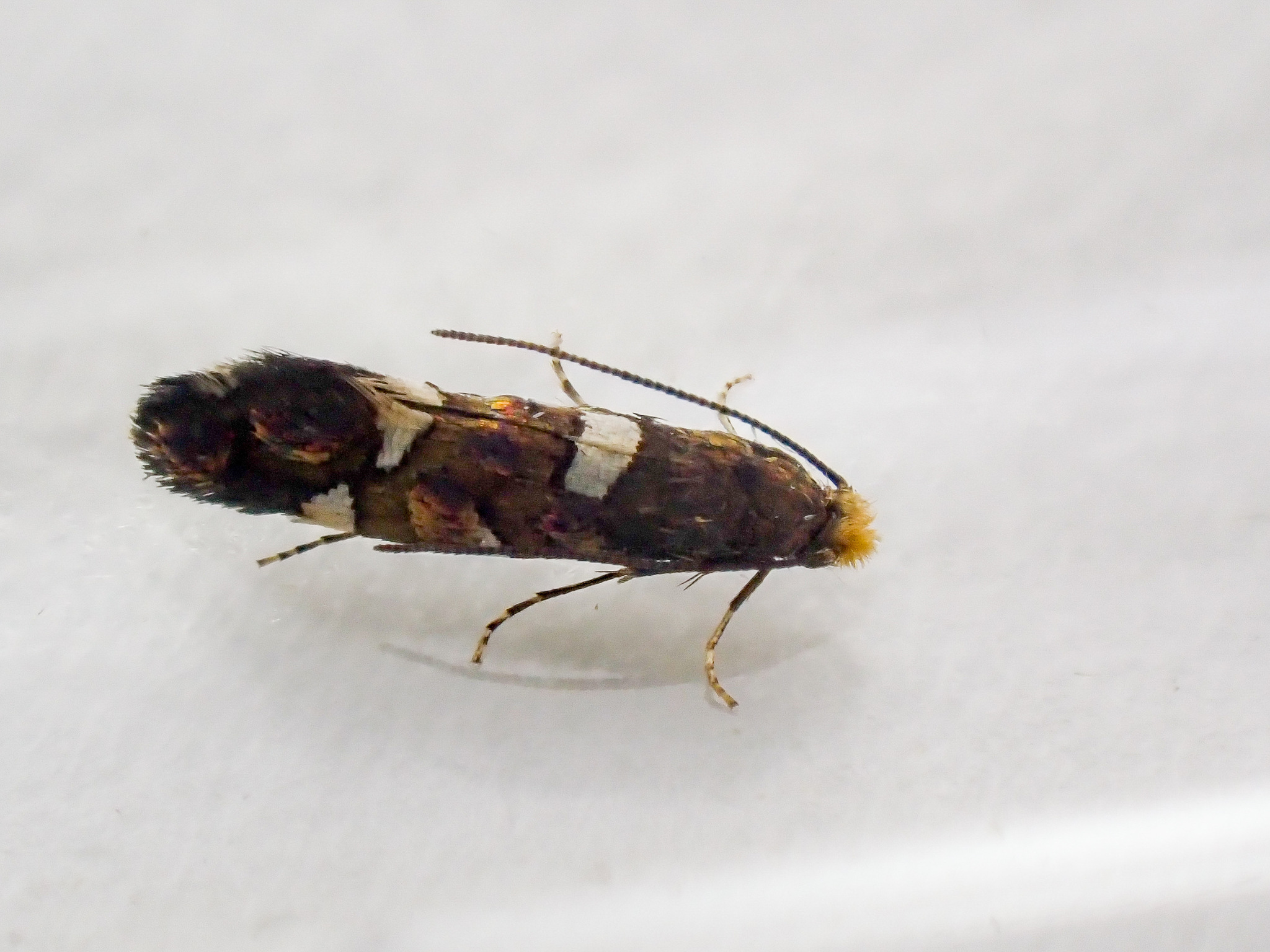
- Xanadoses nielseni, the Kamahi bark scribbler

Scientific classification
- Kingdom: Animalia
- Phylum: Arthropoda
- Class: Insecta
- Order: Lepidoptera
- Superfamily: Adeloidea
- Family: Cecidosidae (Bréthes, 1916)

Genera
- Andescecidium; Cecidonius; Cecidoses; Dicranoses; Ridiaschina; Scyrotis; Xanadoses

Synonyms
- Ridiaschinidae

= Cecidosidae =

Family of moths

Cecidosidae is a family of primitive monotrysian moths in the order Lepidoptera which have a piercing ovipositor used for laying eggs in plant tissue in which they induce galls, or they mine in bark (Davis, 1999; Hoare and Dugdale, 2003). Nine species occur in southern Africa, five species in South America (Parra, 1998) and Xanadoses nielseni was recently described from New Zealand (Hoare and Dugdale, 2003). Some minute parasitoid wasps are known (Burks et al., 2005).
