= Eudalaca stictigrapha =

Scientific classification
- Kingdom: Animalia
- Phylum: Arthropoda
- Class: Insecta
- Order: Lepidoptera
- Family: Hepialidae
- Genus: Eudalaca
- Species: E. stictigrapha

Binomial name
- Eudalaca stictigrapha (Hampson, 1910)

Synonyms
- Dalaca stictigrapha Hampson, 1910

Species of moth

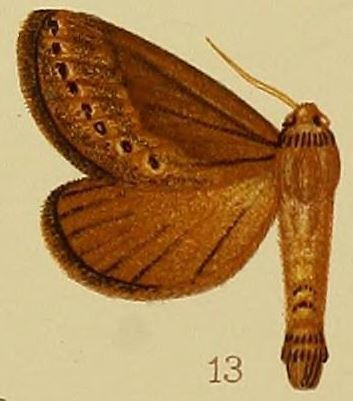
Eudalaca stictigrapha

Eudalaca stictigrapha is a species of moth of the family Hepialidae. It is known from Zimbabwe.

== Taxonomy ==
Some sources list it as a synonym of Eudalaca semicana.
