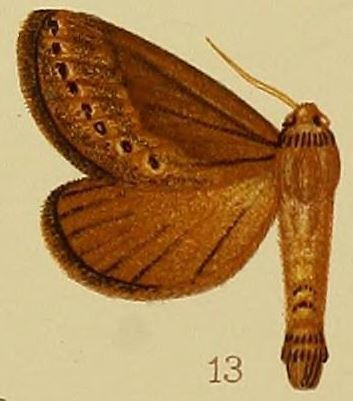
- Eudalaca stictigrapha

Scientific classification
- Kingdom: Animalia
- Phylum: Arthropoda
- Class: Insecta
- Order: Lepidoptera
- Family: Hepialidae
- Genus: Eudalaca; Viette, 1950

Species
- See text

Synonyms
- Eudalacina Paclt, 1953

= Eudalaca =

Genus of moths

Eudalaca is a genus of moths of the family Hepialidae. There are 35 described species, most restricted to South Africa but a few found further north in the continent.

== Species ==
- Eudalaca aequifascia - East Africa
- Eudalaca albiplumis - South Africa
- Eudalaca albistriata - South Africa
- Eudalaca ammon - South Africa/Zimbabwe
- Eudalaca amphiarma - South Africa
- Eudalaca aurifuscalis - South Africa
- Eudalaca bacotii - South Africa
- Eudalaca cretata - South Africa
- Eudalaca crossosema - South Africa
- Eudalaca crudeni - South Africa
- Eudalaca eriogastra - South Africa
- Eudalaca exul - South Africa
- Eudalaca gutterata - South Africa
- Eudalaca hololeuca - South Africa
- Eudalaca holophaea - Congo basin
- Eudalaca homoterma - South Africa
- Eudalaca ibex - South Africa
- Eudalaca infumata - Zimbabwe
- Eudalaca isorrhoa - South Africa
- Eudalaca leucophaea - South Africa
- Eudalaca leniflua - South Africa
- Eudalaca leucocyma - South Africa
- Eudalaca limbopuncta - South Africa
- Eudalaca miniscula - South Africa
- Eudalaca nomaqua - South Africa
- Eudalaca orthocosma - South Africa
- Eudalaca rivula - South Africa
- Eudalaca rufescens - South Africa
  - Larva feeds on grasses
- Eudalaca sanctahelena - Saint Helena
- Eudalaca semicanus - South Africa
- Eudalaca stictigrapha - Zimbabwe
- Eudalaca troglodytis - South Africa
- Eudalaca vaporalis - South Africa
- Eudalaca vindex - South Africa
- Eudalaca zernyi - Tanzania
