= Eudalaca albiplumis =

Scientific classification
- Domain: Eukaryota
- Kingdom: Animalia
- Phylum: Arthropoda
- Class: Insecta
- Order: Lepidoptera
- Family: Hepialidae
- Genus: Eudalaca
- Species: E. albiplumis

Binomial name
- Eudalaca albiplumis (Warren, 1914)

Synonyms
- Gorgopis albiplumis Warren, 1914

Species of moth

Eudalaca albiplumis is a species of moth of the family Hepialidae. It is known from South Africa.
