= Eudalaca hololeuca =

Scientific classification
- Kingdom: Animalia
- Phylum: Arthropoda
- Class: Insecta
- Order: Lepidoptera
- Family: Hepialidae
- Genus: Eudalaca
- Species: E. hololeuca

Binomial name
- Eudalaca hololeuca (Hampson, 1910)

Synonyms
- Dalaca hololeuca Hampson, 1910; Dalaca brunneotincta Strand, 1917

Species of moth

Eudalaca hololeuca is a species of moth of the family Hepialidae. It is known from South Africa and Angola.
