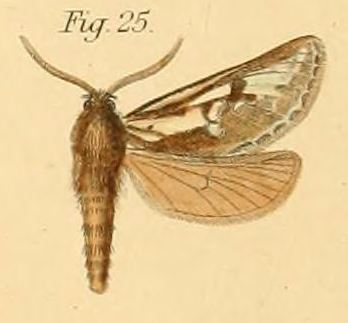

Scientific classification
- Domain: Eukaryota
- Kingdom: Animalia
- Phylum: Arthropoda
- Class: Insecta
- Order: Lepidoptera
- Family: Hepialidae
- Genus: Gorgopis
- Species: G. butlerii

Binomial name
- Gorgopis butlerii Dewitz, 1881

= Gorgopis butlerii =

Species of moth

Gorgopis butlerii is a moth of the family Hepialidae. It is found in South Africa.

This species has a winglength of 17 mm.
