= Gorgopis pholidota =

Scientific classification
- Kingdom: Animalia
- Phylum: Arthropoda
- Class: Insecta
- Order: Lepidoptera
- Family: Hepialidae
- Genus: Gorgopis
- Species: G. pholidota

Binomial name
- Gorgopis pholidota Meyrick, 1921

Species of moth

Gorgopis pholidota is a moth of the family Hepialidae. It is found in South Africa.
