= Eudalaca leucocyma =

Scientific classification
- Kingdom: Animalia
- Phylum: Arthropoda
- Class: Insecta
- Order: Lepidoptera
- Family: Hepialidae
- Genus: Eudalaca
- Species: E. leucocyma

Binomial name
- Eudalaca leucocyma (Hampson, 1910)

Synonyms
- Dalaca leucocyma Hampson, 1910

Species of moth

Eudalaca leucocyma is a species of moth of the family Hepialidae. It is known from South Africa.
