= Gorgopis grisescens =

Scientific classification
- Domain: Eukaryota
- Kingdom: Animalia
- Phylum: Arthropoda
- Class: Insecta
- Order: Lepidoptera
- Family: Hepialidae
- Genus: Gorgopis
- Species: G. grisescens

Binomial name
- Gorgopis grisescens Gaede, 1930

Species of moth

Gorgopis grisescens is a moth of the family Hepialidae. It is found in South Africa.
