= Eudalaca exul =

Scientific classification
- Domain: Eukaryota
- Kingdom: Animalia
- Phylum: Arthropoda
- Class: Insecta
- Order: Lepidoptera
- Family: Hepialidae
- Genus: Eudalaca
- Species: E. exul

Binomial name
- Eudalaca exul (Herrich-Schaffer, [1853])

Synonyms
- Epiolus exul Herrich-Schaffer, [1853]; Hepialus libratus Walker, 1856; Dalaca metaleuca Hampson, 1910; Dalaca tumidifascia Hampson, 1910

Species of moth

Eudalaca exul is a species of moth of the family Hepialidae. It is known from South Africa.
