= Gorgopis serangota =

Scientific classification
- Domain: Eukaryota
- Kingdom: Animalia
- Phylum: Arthropoda
- Class: Insecta
- Order: Lepidoptera
- Family: Hepialidae
- Genus: Gorgopis
- Species: G. serangota

Binomial name
- Gorgopis serangota Janse, 1942

Species of moth

Gorgopis serangota is a species of moth in the family Hepialidae, native to South Africa.
