= Eudalaca rufescens =

Scientific classification
- Kingdom: Animalia
- Phylum: Arthropoda
- Class: Insecta
- Order: Lepidoptera
- Family: Hepialidae
- Genus: Eudalaca
- Species: E. rufescens

Binomial name
- Eudalaca rufescens (Hampson, 1910)

Synonyms
- Dalaca rufescens Hampson, 1910; Dalaca furva Hampson, 1910

Species of moth

Eudalaca rufescens is a species of moth of the family Hepialidae. It is known from South Africa. The larvae feed on grasses.
