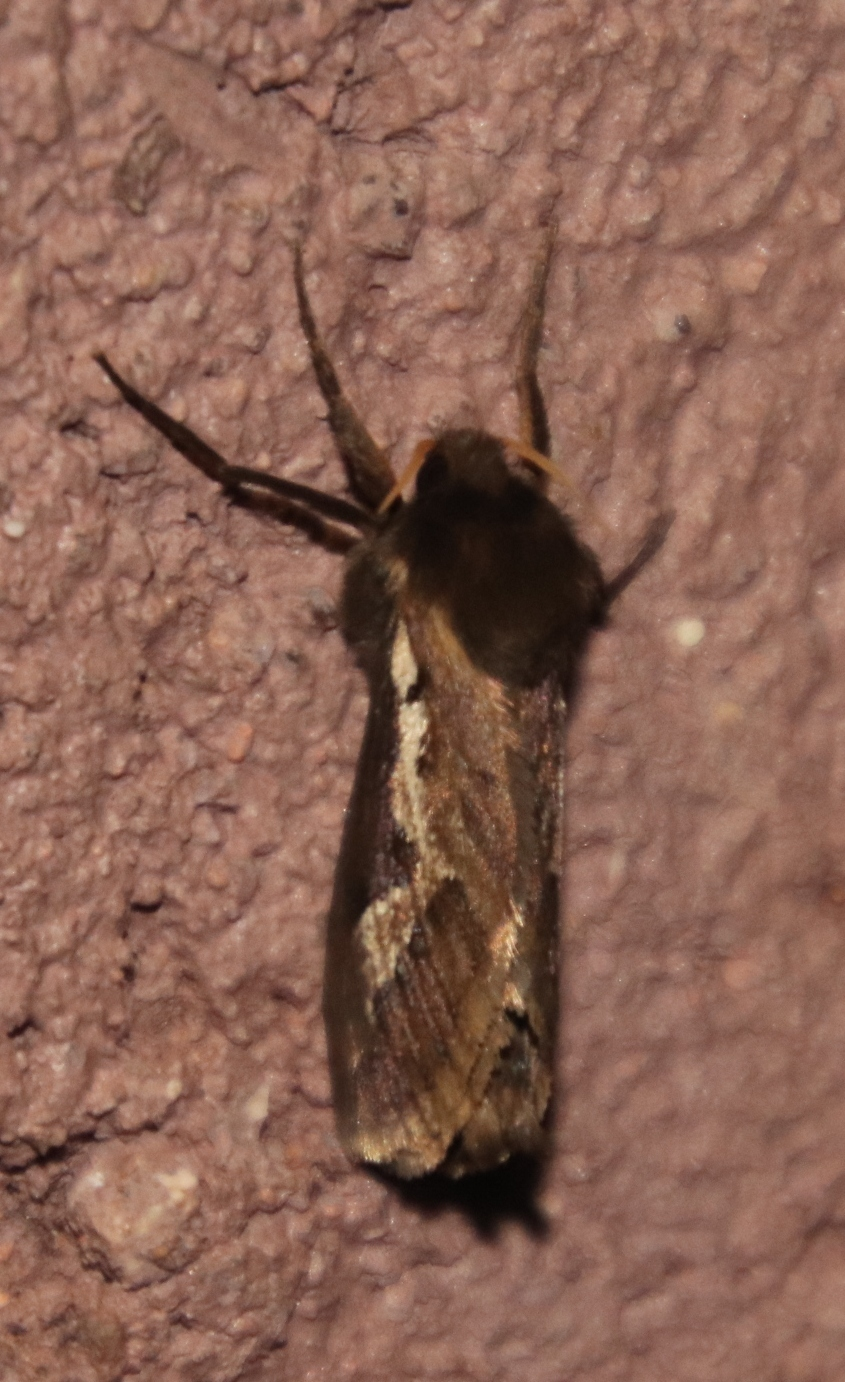

Scientific classification
- Kingdom: Animalia
- Phylum: Arthropoda
- Class: Insecta
- Order: Lepidoptera
- Family: Hepialidae
- Genus: Eudalaca
- Species: E. homoterma

Binomial name
- Eudalaca homoterma (Meyrick, 1921)

Synonyms
- Dalaca homoterma Meyrick, 1921

= Eudalaca homoterma =

Species of moth

Eudalaca homoterma is a species of moth of the family Hepialidae. It is known from South Africa.
