= Eudalaca minuscula =

Scientific classification
- Domain: Eukaryota
- Kingdom: Animalia
- Phylum: Arthropoda
- Class: Insecta
- Order: Lepidoptera
- Family: Hepialidae
- Genus: Eudalaca
- Species: E. minuscula

Binomial name
- Eudalaca minuscula (Janse, 1942)

Synonyms
- Dalaca minuscula Janse, 1942

Species of moth

Eudalaca minuscula is a species of moth of the family Hepialidae. It is known from South Africa.
