= Eudalaca leucophaea =

Scientific classification
- Domain: Eukaryota
- Kingdom: Animalia
- Phylum: Arthropoda
- Class: Insecta
- Order: Lepidoptera
- Family: Hepialidae
- Genus: Eudalaca
- Species: E. leucophaea

Binomial name
- Eudalaca leucophaea (Janse, 1919)

Synonyms
- Dalaca leucophaea Janse, 1919

Species of moth

Eudalaca leucophaea is a species of moth of the family Hepialidae. It is known from South Africa.
