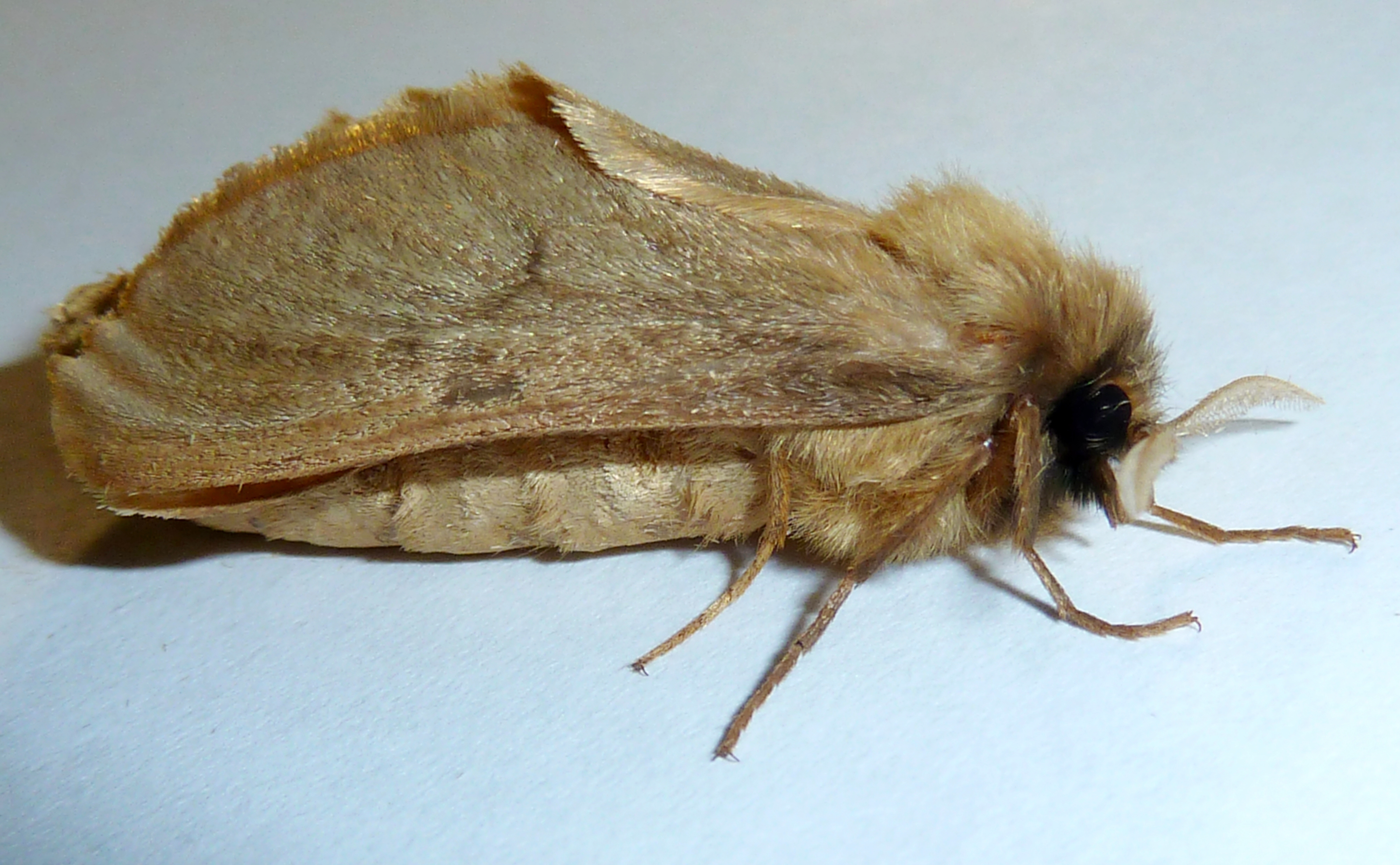

Scientific classification
- Domain: Eukaryota
- Kingdom: Animalia
- Phylum: Arthropoda
- Class: Insecta
- Order: Lepidoptera
- Family: Hepialidae
- Genus: Gorgopis
- Species: G. libania

Binomial name
- Gorgopis libania (Stoll, 1781)

Synonyms
- Phalaena libania Stoll, 1781; Gorgopis abbottii Holland, 1892; Gorgopis angolensis Viette, 1956

= Gorgopis libania =

Species of moth

Gorgopis libania is a moth of the family Hepialidae. It is found in South Africa and Angola. The larva feeds on grasses.
