= Gorgopis alticola =

Scientific classification
- Domain: Eukaryota
- Kingdom: Animalia
- Phylum: Arthropoda
- Class: Insecta
- Order: Lepidoptera
- Family: Hepialidae
- Genus: Gorgopis
- Species: G. alticola

Binomial name
- Gorgopis alticola Aurivillius, 1910

Species of moth

Gorgopis alticola is a moth of the family Hepialidae. It is known from Tanzania.
