= Eudalaca holophaea =

Scientific classification
- Kingdom: Animalia
- Phylum: Arthropoda
- Class: Insecta
- Order: Lepidoptera
- Family: Hepialidae
- Genus: Eudalaca
- Species: E. holophaea

Binomial name
- Eudalaca holophaea (Hampson, 1910)

Synonyms
- Dalaca holophaea Hampson, 1910

Species of moth

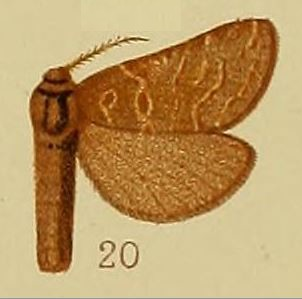
Eudalaca holophaea

Eudalaca holophaea is a species of moth of the family Hepialidae. It is known from the Democratic Republic of Congo.
