= Eudalaca ibex =

Scientific classification
- Kingdom: Animalia
- Phylum: Arthropoda
- Class: Insecta
- Order: Lepidoptera
- Family: Hepialidae
- Genus: Eudalaca
- Species: E. ibex

Binomial name
- Eudalaca ibex (Wallengren, 1860)

Synonyms
- Hepialus ibex Wallengren, 1860; Dalaca albirivula Hampson, 1910

Species of moth

Eudalaca ibex is a species of moth of the family Hepialidae. It is known from South Africa.
