= Gorgopis salti =

Scientific classification
- Domain: Eukaryota
- Kingdom: Animalia
- Phylum: Arthropoda
- Class: Insecta
- Order: Lepidoptera
- Family: Hepialidae
- Genus: Gorgopis
- Species: G. salti

Binomial name
- Gorgopis salti Tams, 1952

Species of moth

Gorgopis salti is a moth of the family Hepialidae. It is found in Tanzania.
