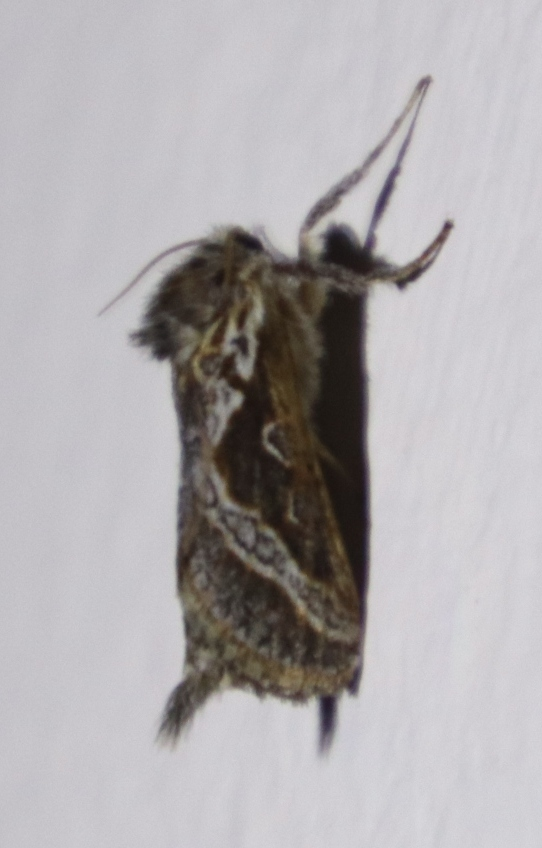

Scientific classification
- Domain: Eukaryota
- Kingdom: Animalia
- Phylum: Arthropoda
- Class: Insecta
- Order: Lepidoptera
- Family: Hepialidae
- Genus: Eudalaca
- Species: E. orthocosma

Binomial name
- Eudalaca orthocosma (Janse, 1942)

Synonyms
- Dalaca orthocosma Janse, 1942

= Eudalaca orthocosma =

Species of moth

Eudalaca orthocosma is a species of moth of the family Hepialidae. It is known from South Africa.
