= Eudalaca sanctahelena =

Scientific classification
- Kingdom: Animalia
- Phylum: Arthropoda
- Class: Insecta
- Order: Lepidoptera
- Family: Hepialidae
- Genus: Eudalaca
- Species: E. sanctahelena

Binomial name
- Eudalaca sanctahelena Viette, 1951

Species of moth

Eudalaca sanctahelena is a species of moth of the family Hepialidae. It was described from Saint Helena, from which its species epithet is derived. However, research suggests it is not from Saint Helena, but probably southern Africa.
