= Eudalaca vindex =

Scientific classification
- Kingdom: Animalia
- Phylum: Arthropoda
- Clade: Pancrustacea
- Class: Insecta
- Order: Lepidoptera
- Family: Hepialidae
- Genus: Eudalaca
- Species: E. vindex

Binomial name
- Eudalaca vindex (Meyrick, 1939)

Synonyms
- Dalaca vindex Meyrick, 1939

Species of moth

Eudalaca vindex is a species of moth in the family Hepialidae. It is known from South Africa.
