= Gorgopis tanganyikaensis =

Scientific classification
- Kingdom: Animalia
- Phylum: Arthropoda
- Class: Insecta
- Order: Lepidoptera
- Family: Hepialidae
- Genus: Gorgopis
- Species: G. tanganyikaensis

Binomial name
- Gorgopis tanganyikaensis Viette, 1950

Species of moth

Gorgopis tanganyikaensis is a moth of the family Hepialidae. It is found in Tanzania.
