= Eudalaca amphiarma =

Scientific classification
- Kingdom: Animalia
- Phylum: Arthropoda
- Class: Insecta
- Order: Lepidoptera
- Family: Hepialidae
- Genus: Eudalaca
- Species: E. amphiarma

Binomial name
- Eudalaca amphiarma (Meyrick, 1926)

Synonyms
- Dalaca amphiarma Meyrick, 1926

Species of moth

Eudalaca amphiarma is a species of moth of the family Hepialidae. It is known from South Africa.
