= Eudalaca eriogastra =

Scientific classification
- Kingdom: Animalia
- Phylum: Arthropoda
- Class: Insecta
- Order: Lepidoptera
- Family: Hepialidae
- Genus: Eudalaca
- Species: E. eriogastra

Binomial name
- Eudalaca eriogastra (Meyrick, 1921)

Synonyms
- Dalaca eriogastra Meyrick, 1921

Species of moth

Eudalaca eriogastra is a species of moth of the family Hepialidae. It is known from South Africa.
