= Eudalaca bacotii =

Scientific classification
- Domain: Eukaryota
- Kingdom: Animalia
- Phylum: Arthropoda
- Class: Insecta
- Order: Lepidoptera
- Family: Hepialidae
- Genus: Eudalaca
- Species: E. bacotii

Binomial name
- Eudalaca bacotii (Quail, 1900)

Synonyms
- Gorgopis bacotii Quail, 1900

Species of moth

Eudalaca bacotii is a species of moth of the family Hepialidae. It is known from South Africa.
