= Gorgopis fuscalis =

Scientific classification
- Kingdom: Animalia
- Phylum: Arthropoda
- Class: Insecta
- Order: Lepidoptera
- Family: Hepialidae
- Genus: Gorgopis
- Species: G. fuscalis

Binomial name
- Gorgopis fuscalis Janse, 1919

Species of moth

Gorgopis fuscalis is a moth of the family Hepialidae. It is found in South Africa.
