= Eudalaca nomaqua =

Scientific classification
- Kingdom: Animalia
- Phylum: Arthropoda
- Class: Insecta
- Order: Lepidoptera
- Family: Hepialidae
- Genus: Eudalaca
- Species: E. nomaqua

Binomial name
- Eudalaca nomaqua (Walker, 1856)

Synonyms
- Dalaca nomaqua Walker, 1856

Species of moth

Eudalaca nomaqua is a species of moth of the family Hepialidae. It is known from South Africa.
