= Gorgopis ptiloscelis =

Scientific classification
- Kingdom: Animalia
- Phylum: Arthropoda
- Class: Insecta
- Order: Lepidoptera
- Family: Hepialidae
- Genus: Gorgopis
- Species: G. ptiloscelis

Binomial name
- Gorgopis ptiloscelis (Meyrick, 1919)

Synonyms
- Hepialus ptiloscelis Meyrick, 1919

Species of moth

Gorgopis ptiloscelis is a moth of the family Hepialidae. It is found in South Africa.
