= Gorgopis aurifuscata =

Scientific classification
- Domain: Eukaryota
- Kingdom: Animalia
- Phylum: Arthropoda
- Class: Insecta
- Order: Lepidoptera
- Family: Hepialidae
- Genus: Gorgopis
- Species: G. aurifuscata

Binomial name
- Gorgopis aurifuscata Janse, 1942

Species of moth

Gorgopis aurifuscata is a moth of the family Hepialidae. It is found in South Africa.
