= Gorgopis annulosa =

Scientific classification
- Domain: Eukaryota
- Kingdom: Animalia
- Phylum: Arthropoda
- Class: Insecta
- Order: Lepidoptera
- Family: Hepialidae
- Genus: Gorgopis
- Species: G. annulosa

Binomial name
- Gorgopis annulosa Gaede, 1930

Species of moth

Gorgopis annulosa is a moth of the family Hepialidae. It is known from South Africa.
