= Gorgopis pallidiflava =

Scientific classification
- Domain: Eukaryota
- Kingdom: Animalia
- Phylum: Arthropoda
- Class: Insecta
- Order: Lepidoptera
- Family: Hepialidae
- Genus: Gorgopis
- Species: G. pallidiflava

Binomial name
- Gorgopis pallidiflava Janse, 1942

Species of moth

Gorgopis pallidiflava is a moth of the family Hepialidae. It is found in South Africa. It was first described by Antonius Johannes Theodorus Janse in 1942.
