= Eudalaca troglodytis =

Scientific classification
- Domain: Eukaryota
- Kingdom: Animalia
- Phylum: Arthropoda
- Class: Insecta
- Order: Lepidoptera
- Family: Hepialidae
- Genus: Eudalaca
- Species: E. troglodytis

Binomial name
- Eudalaca troglodytis (Janse, 1919)

Synonyms
- Dalaca troglodytis Janse, 1919; Dalaca troglodytes Janse, 1942

Species of moth

Eudalaca troglodytis is a species of moth of the family Hepialidae. It is known from South Africa.
