= Gorgopis anguistiptera =

Scientific classification
- Domain: Eukaryota
- Kingdom: Animalia
- Phylum: Arthropoda
- Class: Insecta
- Order: Lepidoptera
- Family: Hepialidae
- Genus: Gorgopis
- Species: G. anguistiptera

Binomial name
- Gorgopis anguistiptera (Janse, 1948)

Synonyms
- Metahepialus anguistiptera Janse, 1948

Species of moth

Gorgopis anguistiptera is a moth of the family Hepialidae. It is endemic to South Africa.
