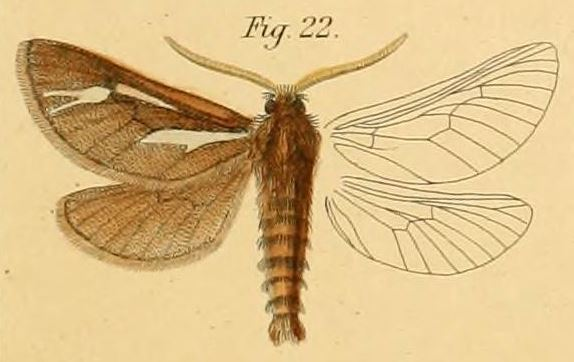
- Gorgopis zellerii

Scientific classification
- Domain: Eukaryota
- Kingdom: Animalia
- Phylum: Arthropoda
- Class: Insecta
- Order: Lepidoptera
- Family: Hepialidae
- Genus: Gorgopis; Hübner, 1820

Species
- See text

Synonyms
- Gorcopis Walker, 1856

= Gorgopis =

Genus of moths

Gorgopis is a genus of moths of the family Hepialidae. There are 28 described species found in southern and eastern Africa.

== Species ==
- Gorgopis alticola - Tanzania
- Gorgopis angustiptera
- Gorgopis annulosa - South Africa
- Gorgopis armillata - South Africa
- Gorgopis auratilis - South Africa
- Gorgopis aurifuscata
- Gorgopis butlerii - South Africa
- Gorgopis caffra - South Africa
- Gorgopis centaurica - South Africa
- Gorgopis cochlias - South Africa
- Gorgopis crudeni - South Africa
- Gorgopis furcata - South Africa
- Gorgopis fuscalis - South Africa
- Gorgopis grisescens - South Africa
- Gorgopis hunti - South Africa
- Gorgopis inornata - South Africa
- Gorgopis intervallata - South Africa
- Gorgopis leucopetala - South Africa
- Gorgopis libania - South Africa/Angola

- Larva feeds on grasses

- Gorgopis limbopunctata
- Gorgopis lobata - South Africa
- Gorgopis olivaceonotata - South Africa
- Gorgopis pallidiflava - South Africa
- Gorgopis pholidota - South Africa
- Gorgopis ptiloscelis - South Africa
- Gorgopis salti - Tanzania
- Gorgopis serangota - South Africa
- Gorgopis subrimosa - South Africa
- Gorgopis tanganyikaensis - Tanzania
- Gorgopis zellerii - South Africa
