= Gorgopis subrimosa =

Scientific classification
- Domain: Eukaryota
- Kingdom: Animalia
- Phylum: Arthropoda
- Class: Insecta
- Order: Lepidoptera
- Family: Hepialidae
- Genus: Gorgopis
- Species: G. subrimosa

Binomial name
- Gorgopis subrimosa Janse, 1942

Species of moth

Gorgopis subrimosa is a moth of the family Hepialidae. It is found in South Africa.
