= Gorgopis caffra =

Scientific classification
- Kingdom: Animalia
- Phylum: Arthropoda
- Class: Insecta
- Order: Lepidoptera
- Family: Hepialidae
- Genus: Gorgopis
- Species: G. caffra

Binomial name
- Gorgopis caffra Walker, 1856

Synonyms
- Hepiolus cervinus Wallengren, 1860

Species of moth

Gorgopis caffra is a moth of the family Hepialidae. It is found in South Africa.
