= Eudalaca vaporalis =

Scientific classification
- Kingdom: Animalia
- Phylum: Arthropoda
- Class: Insecta
- Order: Lepidoptera
- Family: Hepialidae
- Genus: Eudalaca
- Species: E. vaporalis

Binomial name
- Eudalaca vaporalis (Meyrick, 1921)

Synonyms
- Dalaca vaporalis Meyrick, 1921; Dalaca homostola Hampson, 1910

Species of moth

Eudalaca vaporalis is a species of moth of the family Hepialidae. It is known from South Africa.
