= Eudalaca cretata =

Scientific classification
- Domain: Eukaryota
- Kingdom: Animalia
- Phylum: Arthropoda
- Class: Insecta
- Order: Lepidoptera
- Family: Hepialidae
- Genus: Eudalaca
- Species: E. cretata

Binomial name
- Eudalaca cretata (Distant, 1897)

Synonyms
- Dalaca cretata Distant, 1897

Species of moth

Eudalaca cretata is a species of moth of the family Hepialidae. It is known from South Africa.
