= Eudalaca aequifascia =

Scientific classification
- Kingdom: Animalia
- Phylum: Arthropoda
- Clade: Pancrustacea
- Class: Insecta
- Order: Lepidoptera
- Family: Hepialidae
- Genus: Eudalaca
- Species: E. aequifascia

Binomial name
- Eudalaca aequifascia (Gaede, 1930)

Synonyms
- Dalaca aequifascia Gaede, 1930

Species of moth

Eudalaca aequifascia is a species of moth of the family Hepialidae. It is known from Tanzania.
