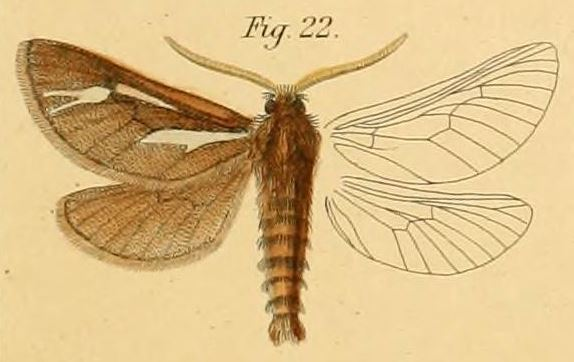

Scientific classification
- Domain: Eukaryota
- Kingdom: Animalia
- Phylum: Arthropoda
- Class: Insecta
- Order: Lepidoptera
- Family: Hepialidae
- Genus: Gorgopis
- Species: G. zellerii

Binomial name
- Gorgopis zellerii Dewitz, 1881

= Gorgopis zellerii =

Species of moth

Gorgopis zellerii is a moth of the family Hepialidae. It is found in South Africa.

This species has a winglength of 21 mm.
