= Eudalaca zernyi =

Scientific classification
- Kingdom: Animalia
- Phylum: Arthropoda
- Class: Insecta
- Order: Lepidoptera
- Family: Hepialidae
- Genus: Eudalaca
- Species: E. zernyi

Binomial name
- Eudalaca zernyi (Viette, 1950)

Synonyms
- Dalaca zernyi Viette, 1950

Species of moth

Eudalaca zernyi is a species of moth of the family Hepialidae. It is known from Tanzania.
