= Eudalaca ammon =

Scientific classification
- Kingdom: Animalia
- Phylum: Arthropoda
- Class: Insecta
- Order: Lepidoptera
- Family: Hepialidae
- Genus: Eudalaca
- Species: E. ammon

Binomial name
- Eudalaca ammon (Wallengren, 1860)

Synonyms
- Hepiolus ammon Wallengren, 1860; Dalaca fuscescens Hampson, 1910; Dalaca goniophora Hampson, 1910; Dalaca rhodesiensis Hampson, 1910; Dalaca hampsoni Strand, 1917

Species of moth

Eudalaca ammon is a species of moth of the family Hepialidae. It is known from South Africa, Zimbabwe and the Democratic Republic of Congo.
