= Eudalaca albistriata =

Scientific classification
- Kingdom: Animalia
- Phylum: Arthropoda
- Class: Insecta
- Order: Lepidoptera
- Family: Hepialidae
- Genus: Eudalaca
- Species: E. albistriata

Binomial name
- Eudalaca albistriata (Hampson, 1910)

Synonyms
- Dalaca albistriata Hampson, 1910

Species of moth

Eudalaca albistriata is a species of moth of the family Hepialidae. It is known from South Africa and Lesotho.
