= Gorgopis auratilis =

Scientific classification
- Domain: Eukaryota
- Kingdom: Animalia
- Phylum: Arthropoda
- Class: Insecta
- Order: Lepidoptera
- Family: Hepialidae
- Genus: Gorgopis
- Species: G. auratilis

Binomial name
- Gorgopis auratilis Janse, 1919

Species of moth

Gorgopis auratilis is a moth of the family Hepialidae. It originates from South Africa.
