= Eudalaca semicanus =

Scientific classification
- Domain: Eukaryota
- Kingdom: Animalia
- Phylum: Arthropoda
- Class: Insecta
- Order: Lepidoptera
- Family: Hepialidae
- Genus: Eudalaca
- Species: E. semicanus

Binomial name
- Eudalaca semicanus (Janse, 1919)

Synonyms
- Dalaca semicanus Janse, 1919

Species of moth

Eudalaca semicanus is a species of moth of the family Hepialidae. It is known from South Africa.
