= Gorgopis limbopuncta =

Scientific classification
- Domain: Eukaryota
- Kingdom: Animalia
- Phylum: Arthropoda
- Class: Insecta
- Order: Lepidoptera
- Family: Hepialidae
- Genus: Gorgopis
- Species: G. limbopuncta

Binomial name
- Gorgopis limbopuncta (Gaede, 1930)

Synonyms
- Dalaca limbopuncta Gaede, 1930; Eudalaca limbopuncta; Gorgopis limbopunctata

Species of moth

Gorgopis limbopuncta is a species of moth of the family Hepialidae. It is known from South Africa.
