= Eporycta hiracopis =

Scientific classification
- Domain: Eukaryota
- Kingdom: Animalia
- Phylum: Arthropoda
- Class: Insecta
- Order: Lepidoptera
- Family: Xyloryctidae
- Genus: Eporycta
- Species: E. hiracopis

Binomial name
- Eporycta hiracopis Meyrick, 1921

Species of moth

Eporycta hiracopis is a moth in the family Xyloryctidae. It was described by Edward Meyrick in 1921. It is found in Australia, where it has been recorded from South Australia and Victoria.

The wingspan is about 32 mm. The forewings are whitish irregularly tinged with pale grey, and with some scattered grey scales. There is a small mark of dark grey irroration (sprinkling) towards the costa near the base. The stigmata are dark grey, the plical obliquely before the first discal, an additional dot beneath the second discal. The hindwings are pale grey, whitish tinged towards the base.
