= Eporycta tarbalea =

Scientific classification
- Domain: Eukaryota
- Kingdom: Animalia
- Phylum: Arthropoda
- Class: Insecta
- Order: Lepidoptera
- Family: Xyloryctidae
- Genus: Eporycta
- Species: E. tarbalea

Binomial name
- Eporycta tarbalea Meyrick, 1908

Species of moth

Eporycta tarbalea is a moth in the family Xyloryctidae. It was described by Edward Meyrick in 1908. It is found in South Africa's Limpopo province.

The wingspan is about 25 mm. The forewings are ochreous white, with the costa, apex and termen somewhat suffused narrowly with pale yellow ochreous. The hindwings are pale whitish grey, slightly ochreous tinged.
