= Eporycta lurida =

Scientific classification
- Kingdom: Animalia
- Phylum: Arthropoda
- Clade: Pancrustacea
- Class: Insecta
- Order: Lepidoptera
- Family: Xyloryctidae
- Genus: Eporycta
- Species: E. lurida

Binomial name
- Eporycta lurida Mey, 2011

Species of moth

Eporycta lurida is a moth in the family Xyloryctidae. It was described by Wolfram Mey in 2011. It is found in South Africa and Namibia.
