= Eporycta pachnoscia =

Scientific classification
- Domain: Eukaryota
- Kingdom: Animalia
- Phylum: Arthropoda
- Class: Insecta
- Order: Lepidoptera
- Family: Xyloryctidae
- Genus: Eporycta
- Species: E. pachnoscia

Binomial name
- Eporycta pachnoscia Meyrick, 1915

Species of moth

Eporycta pachnoscia is a moth in the family Xyloryctidae. It was described by Edward Meyrick in 1915. It is found on Madagascar.

The wingspan is about 28 mm. The forewings are fuscous, somewhat sprinkled with whitish and with an undefined median longitudinal streak of more pronounced whitish irroration (sprinkles), more distinct between the stigmata. The stigmata are somewhat darker fuscous, the plical rather obliquely beyond the first discal. The hindwings are light fuscous.
