= Eporycta =

Scientific classification
- Domain: Eukaryota
- Kingdom: Animalia
- Phylum: Arthropoda
- Class: Insecta
- Order: Lepidoptera
- Family: Xyloryctidae
- Genus: Eporycta; Meyrick, 1908

Moth genus in family Xyloryctidae

Eporycta is a genus of moths of the family Xyloryctidae.

== Species ==
- Eporycta chionaula Meyrick, 1920
- Eporycta hiracopis Meyrick, 1921
- Eporycta incanescens Meyrick, 1921
- Eporycta lurida Mey, 2011
- Eporycta pachnoscia Meyrick, 1915
- Eporycta tarbalea Meyrick, 1908
