= Eporycta chionaula =

Scientific classification
- Domain: Eukaryota
- Kingdom: Animalia
- Phylum: Arthropoda
- Class: Insecta
- Order: Lepidoptera
- Family: Xyloryctidae
- Genus: Eporycta
- Species: E. chionaula

Binomial name
- Eporycta chionaula Meyrick, 1920

Species of moth

Eporycta chionaula is a moth in the family Xyloryctidae. It was described by Edward Meyrick in 1920. It is found in South Africa's Free State province.

The wingspan is about 29 mm. The forewings are light ochreous suffusedly mixed with grey, especially on the veins. The markings are shining snow white. There is a streak along the costa from the base almost to the apex, cut by lines of ground colour on veins 9 to 11. A moderate streak is found from the base above the middle to the termen beneath the apex, on the posterior fourth bisected by a line of ground colour. There are streaks between veins 2 and 5, the uppermost very slender and short. There are also streaks above and beneath vein 1b, the lower one not extended quite to its apex. The hindwings are light greyish ochreous.
