= Eporycta incanescens =

Scientific classification
- Domain: Eukaryota
- Kingdom: Animalia
- Phylum: Arthropoda
- Class: Insecta
- Order: Lepidoptera
- Family: Xyloryctidae
- Genus: Eporycta
- Species: E. incanescens

Binomial name
- Eporycta incanescens Meyrick, 1921

Species of moth

Eporycta incanescens is a moth in the family Xyloryctidae. It was described by Edward Meyrick in 1921. It is found in South Africa.

The wingspan is about 28 mm. The forewings are rather light grey sprinkled with white, more strongly in the disc, with a median longitudinal streak of white suffusion from the base to about end of the cell. There is a faint grey transverse mark on the end of the cell. The hindwings are light grey.
