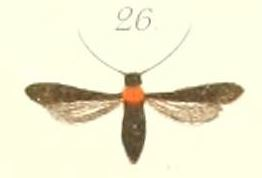
- Illustration of Tinthia ruficollaris

Scientific classification
- Kingdom: Animalia
- Phylum: Arthropoda
- Class: Insecta
- Order: Lepidoptera
- Family: Sesiidae
- Subfamily: Tinthiinae; Le Cerf, 1917

Type genus
- Tinthia Walker [1865]

= Tinthiinae =

Subfamily of moths

The Tinthiinae are a subfamily of clearwing moths, first established in 1917 by Ferdinand Le Cerf.

== Tribes and genera ==
Tinthiinae consists of twenty-four genera across four tribes:

Tinthiini

- Microsphecia Bartel 1912
- Tinthia Walker [1865]
- Sophona Walker 1856
- Zenodoxus Grote & Robinson 1868
- Conopsia Strand [1913]
- Paranthrenopsis Le Cerf 1911
- Entrichella Bryk 1947
- Negotinthia Gorbunov 2001
- Trichocerota Hampson [1893a]
- Paradoxecia Hampson 1919
- Rectala Bryk 1947
- Tyrictaca Walker 1862
- Caudicornia Bryk 1947
- Bidentotinthia Arita & Gorbunov 2003
- Tarsotinthia Arita & Gorbunov 2003

Pennisetiini

- Pennisetia Dehne 1850
- Corematosetia Kallies & Arita 2001

Paraglosseciini

- Oligophlebia Hampson [1893]
- Isothamnis Meyrick 1935
- Cyanophlebia Arita & Gorbunov 2001
- Lophocnema Turner 1917
- Diapyra Turner 1917

Similipepsini

- Similipepsis Le Cerf 1911
- Gasterostena Arita & Gorbunov 2003
