= Sophon =

Sophon may refer to:

- Sophon (name), people with the name Sophon
- Sophon (restaurant), Cambodian restaurant in Seattle
- Sophon, a fictional elementary particle in the novel The Three-Body Problem
  - Sophon, a fictional character in the sequel novel Death's End

== See also ==
- Sophona, a genus of moths
- Sophos
