= Malgassesia rufithorax =

Scientific classification
- Domain: Eukaryota
- Kingdom: Animalia
- Phylum: Arthropoda
- Class: Insecta
- Order: Lepidoptera
- Family: Sesiidae
- Genus: Malgassesia
- Species: M. rufithorax

Binomial name
- Malgassesia rufithorax (Le Cerf, 1922)

Synonyms
- Epitarsipus rufithorax Le Cerf, 1922; Malgasesia rufithorax

Species of moth

Malgassesia rufithorax is a moth of the family Sesiidae. It is known from Madagascar.
