= Megalosphecia gigantipes =

Scientific classification
- Kingdom: Animalia
- Phylum: Arthropoda
- Class: Insecta
- Order: Lepidoptera
- Family: Sesiidae
- Genus: Megalosphecia
- Species: M. gigantipes

Binomial name
- Megalosphecia gigantipes Le Cerf, 1916

Synonyms
- Megalosphecia obscura Le Cerf, 1916

Species of moth

Megalosphecia gigantipes is a moth of the family Sesiidae. It is known from Cameroon.
