= Malgassesia rufescens =

Scientific classification
- Domain: Eukaryota
- Kingdom: Animalia
- Phylum: Arthropoda
- Class: Insecta
- Order: Lepidoptera
- Family: Sesiidae
- Genus: Malgassesia
- Species: M. rufescens

Binomial name
- Malgassesia rufescens Le Cerf, 1922

Synonyms
- Malgasesia rufescens

Species of moth

Malgassesia rufescens is a moth of the family Sesiidae. It is known from Madagascar.
