= Similipepsis violacea =

Scientific classification
- Kingdom: Animalia
- Phylum: Arthropoda
- Class: Insecta
- Order: Lepidoptera
- Family: Sesiidae
- Genus: Similipepsis
- Species: S. violacea

Binomial name
- Similipepsis violacea Le Cerf, 1911

Species of moth

Similipepsis violacea is a moth of the family Sesiidae. It is known from the Republic of the Congo and Gabon.
