= Callisphecia oberthueri =

Scientific classification
- Kingdom: Animalia
- Phylum: Arthropoda
- Clade: Pancrustacea
- Class: Insecta
- Order: Lepidoptera
- Family: Sesiidae
- Genus: Callisphecia
- Species: C. oberthueri

Binomial name
- Callisphecia oberthueri Le Cerf, 1916

Species of moth

Callisphecia oberthueri is a moth of the family Sesiidae. It is known from Cameroon.
