= Malgassesia pauliani =

Scientific classification
- Kingdom: Animalia
- Phylum: Arthropoda
- Class: Insecta
- Order: Lepidoptera
- Family: Sesiidae
- Genus: Malgassesia
- Species: M. pauliani

Binomial name
- Malgassesia pauliani Viette, 1955

Synonyms
- Malgasesia pauliani

Species of moth

Malgassesia pauliani is a moth of the family Sesiidae. It is known from southern Madagascar.

The wingspan of this species is 24 mm with a length of the forewings of 11 mm. The holotype was collected in the extreme south of Madagascar between Faux Cap and Cap Sainte Marie.
