= Megalosphecia callosoma =

Scientific classification
- Kingdom: Animalia
- Phylum: Arthropoda
- Class: Insecta
- Order: Lepidoptera
- Family: Sesiidae
- Genus: Megalosphecia
- Species: M. callosoma

Binomial name
- Megalosphecia callosoma Hampson, 1919

Species of moth

Megalosphecia callosoma is a moth of the family Sesiidae. It is known from Zambia.
