= Oligophlebia nigralba =

Scientific classification
- Kingdom: Animalia
- Phylum: Arthropoda
- Class: Insecta
- Order: Lepidoptera
- Family: Sesiidae
- Genus: Oligophlebia
- Species: O. nigralba

Binomial name
- Oligophlebia nigralba Hampson, 1892

Species of moth

Oligophlebia nigralba is a moth of the family Sesiidae first described by George Hampson in 1892. It is found in Sri Lanka.
