= Proaegeria =

Scientific classification
- Kingdom: Animalia
- Phylum: Arthropoda
- Clade: Pancrustacea
- Class: Insecta
- Order: Lepidoptera
- Family: Sesiidae
- Genus: Proaegeria; Le Cerf, 1916
- Species: P. vouauxi

Binomial name
- Proaegeria vouauxi Le Cerf, 1916

Genus of moths

Proaegeria is a genus of moths in the family Sesiidae containing only one species, Proaegeria vouauxi, which is known from Cameroon.
