= Megalosphecia =

Scientific classification
- Kingdom: Animalia
- Phylum: Arthropoda
- Class: Insecta
- Order: Lepidoptera
- Family: Sesiidae
- Subfamily: Sesiinae
- Genus: Megalosphecia; Le Cerf, 1916

Species
- See text

Genus of moths

Megalosphecia is a genus of moths in the family Sesiidae.

== Species ==
- Megalosphecia callosoma Hampson, 1919
- Megalosphecia gigantipes Le Cerf, 1916
