= Malgassesia =

Scientific classification
- Domain: Eukaryota
- Kingdom: Animalia
- Phylum: Arthropoda
- Class: Insecta
- Order: Lepidoptera
- Family: Sesiidae
- Tribe: Synanthedonini
- Genus: Malgassesia; Le Cerf, 1922

Species
- See text

Genus of moths

Malgassesia is a genus of moths in the family Sesiidae.

== Species ==
- Malgassesia ankaratralis Viette, 1957
- Malgassesia biedermanni Viette, 1982
- Malgassesia milloti Viette, 1982
- Malgassesia pauliani Viette, [1955]
- Malgassesia rufescens Le Cerf, 1922
- Malgassesia rufithorax (Le Cerf, 1922)
- Malgassesia seyrigi Viette, [1955]
