= Microsynanthedon ambrensis =

Scientific classification
- Kingdom: Animalia
- Phylum: Arthropoda
- Class: Insecta
- Order: Lepidoptera
- Family: Sesiidae
- Genus: Microsynanthedon
- Species: M. ambrensis

Binomial name
- Microsynanthedon ambrensis Viette, [1955]

Species of moth

Microsynanthedon ambrensis is a moth of the family Sesiidae. It is known from Madagascar.
