= Grypopalpia iridescens =

Scientific classification
- Kingdom: Animalia
- Phylum: Arthropoda
- Class: Insecta
- Order: Lepidoptera
- Family: Sesiidae
- Genus: Grypopalpia
- Species: G. iridescens

Binomial name
- Grypopalpia iridescens Hampson, 1919

Species of moth

Grypopalpia iridescens is a moth of the family Sesiidae. It is known from South Africa.
