= Pseudalcathoe =

Scientific classification
- Domain: Eukaryota
- Kingdom: Animalia
- Phylum: Arthropoda
- Class: Insecta
- Order: Lepidoptera
- Family: Sesiidae
- Tribe: Synanthedonini
- Genus: Pseudalcathoe; Le Cerf, 1916

Species
- See text

Genus of moths

Pseudalcathoe is a genus of moths in the family Sesiidae.

== Species ==
- Pseudalcathoe chatanayi Le Cerf, 1916b
- Pseudalcathoe aspetura Meyrick, 1932
