= Oligophlebia igniflua =

Scientific classification
- Kingdom: Animalia
- Phylum: Arthropoda
- Class: Insecta
- Order: Lepidoptera
- Family: Sesiidae
- Genus: Oligophlebia
- Species: O. igniflua

Binomial name
- Oligophlebia igniflua (T.P. Lucas, 1893)

Synonyms
- Sesia igniflua Lucas, 1894; Diapyra igniflua; Glossecia igniflua; Pennisetia igniflua

Species of moth

Oligophlebia igniflua is a moth of the family Sesiidae. It is only known from the Brisbane district in Queensland, but the distribution of its known host-plant suggests that it will ultimately be found to occur in other rainforest areas in Queensland and the Northern Territory.

The length of the forewings is about 6 mm for males and 6–7 for females.

The larvae tunnel the trunk of the rainforest tree Elaeocarpus grandis. Pupation takes place in the bark.
