= Aegerina =

Scientific classification
- Domain: Eukaryota
- Kingdom: Animalia
- Phylum: Arthropoda
- Class: Insecta
- Order: Lepidoptera
- Family: Sesiidae
- Tribe: Synanthedonini
- Genus: Aegerina; Le Cerf, 1917

Species
- See text

Genus of moths

Aegerina is a genus of moths in the family Sesiidae.

== Species ==
- Aegerina allotriochora Zukowsky, 1936
- Aegerina alomyaeformis Zukowsky, 1936
- Aegerina mesostenos Zukowsky, 1936
- Aegerina ovinia (Druce, 1896)
- Aegerina silvai (Köhler, 1953)
- Aegerina vignae Busck, 1929
