= Diapyra =

Scientific classification
- Domain: Eukaryota
- Kingdom: Animalia
- Phylum: Arthropoda
- Class: Insecta
- Order: Lepidoptera
- Family: Sesiidae
- Subfamily: Tinthiinae
- Genus: Diapyra; Turner, 1917

Species
- See text

Genus of moths

Diapyra is a genus of moths in the family Sesiidae.

== Species ==
- Diapyra igniflua (Lucas, 1894)
