= Madasphecia puera =

Scientific classification
- Kingdom: Animalia
- Phylum: Arthropoda
- Class: Insecta
- Order: Lepidoptera
- Family: Sesiidae
- Genus: Madasphecia
- Species: M. puera

Binomial name
- Madasphecia puera (Viette, 1957)

Synonyms
- Callisphecia puera Viette, 1957

Species of moth

Madasphecia puera is a moth of the family Sesiidae. It is known from eastern Madagascar. This species is attracted to ultraviolet light.
