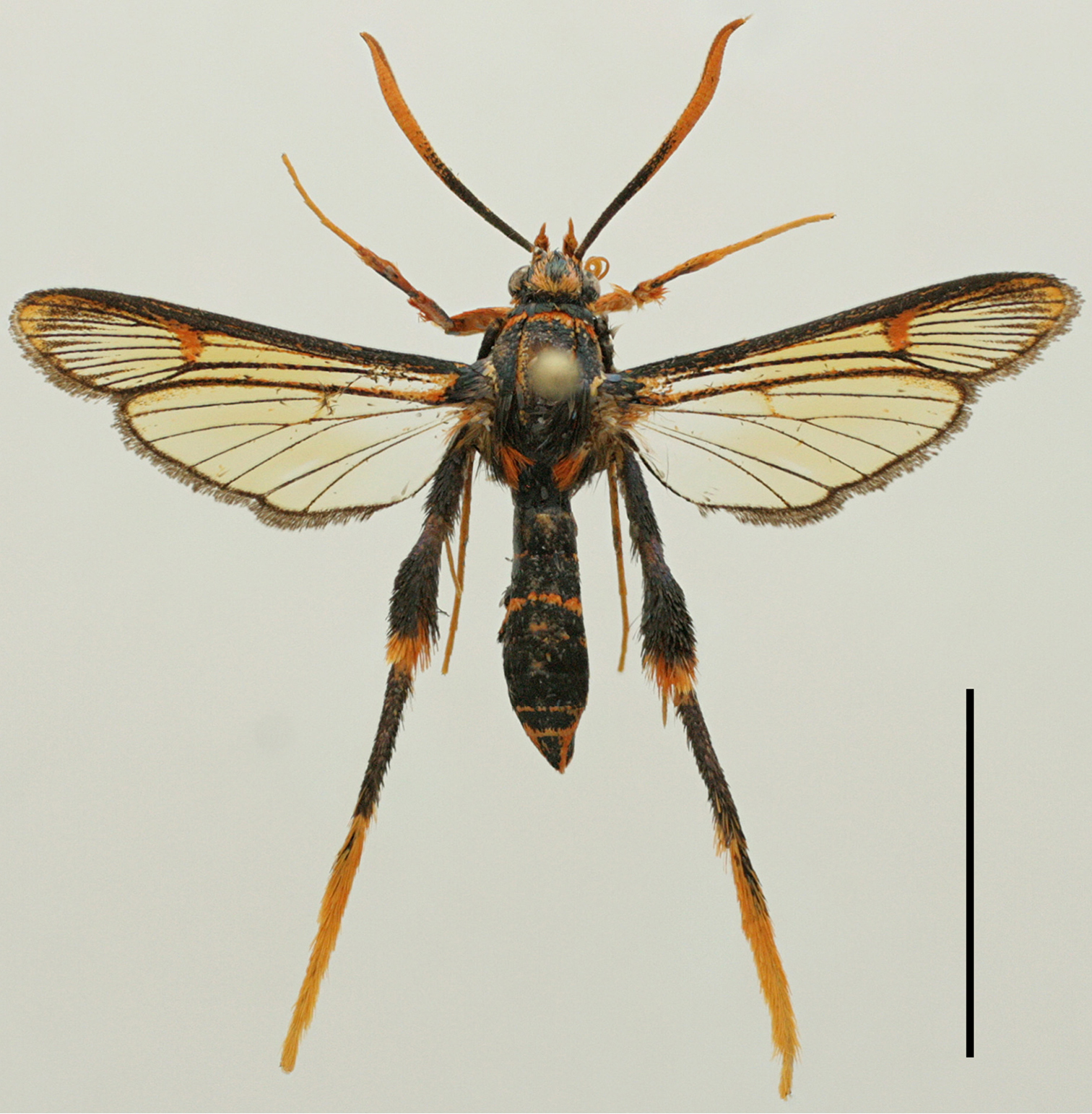

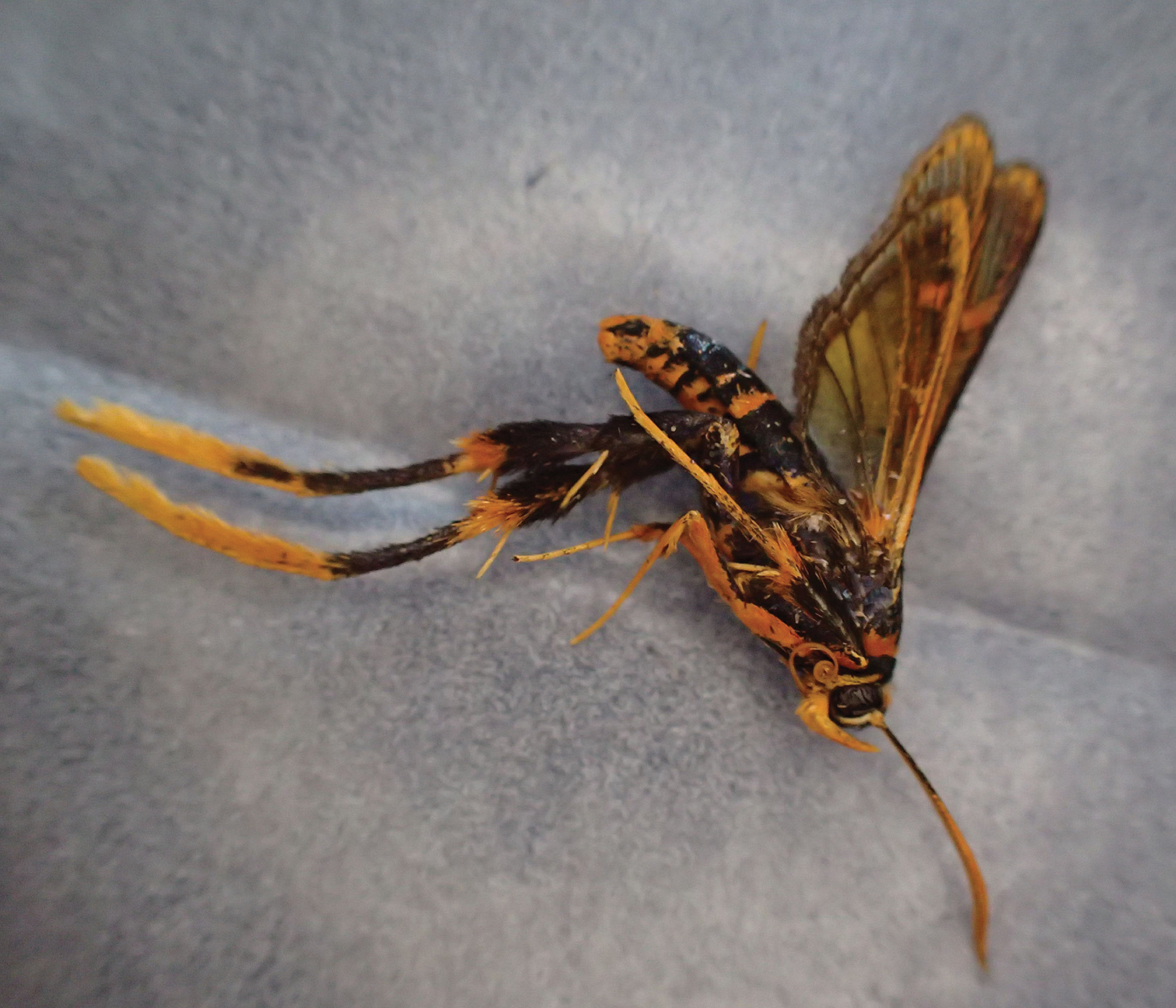

Scientific classification
- Kingdom: Animalia
- Phylum: Arthropoda
- Clade: Pancrustacea
- Class: Insecta
- Order: Lepidoptera
- Family: Sesiidae
- Genus: Teinotarsina
- Species: T. aurantiaca

Binomial name
- Teinotarsina aurantiaca Yagi, Hirowatari & Arita, 2016

= Teinotarsina aurantiaca =

Species of moth

Teinotarsina aurantiaca is a moth of the family Sesiidae. It is known from Japan (Okinawa-jima).

The wingspan is about 29 mm. The forewings are basally transparent, in other parts semitransparent with a brownish sheen. At the costal and anal margins, the CuA-stem is black with a dark violet-purple sheen, scattered with orange scales. The discal spot is yellow-orange and the apical area is narrow with yellowish orange scales. There are projections of dark brown scales from the distal margin of the forewing into the cells of ETA, but no projection into ATA and PTA. The hindwings are basally transparent, other parts semitransparent with a brownish sheen. The veins and outer margin are dark brown with orange scales and the discal spot is undeveloped. The apical area has orange scales and the outer margin is narrow, about two-three times as narrow as the cilia, which is dark brown.

== Etymology ==
The species name aurantiaca is the female form of Latin aurantiacus (meaning orange) and refers to the orange body of the species.
