= Hymenosphecia =

Scientific classification
- Kingdom: Animalia
- Phylum: Arthropoda
- Class: Insecta
- Order: Lepidoptera
- Family: Sesiidae
- Genus: Hymenosphecia; Le Cerf, 1917
- Species: H. albomaculata

Binomial name
- Hymenosphecia albomaculata Le Cerf, 1917

Genus of moths

Hymenosphecia is a genus of moths in the family Sesiidae containing only one species, Hymenosphecia albomaculata, which is known from Uganda.
