= Metasphecia =

Scientific classification
- Kingdom: Animalia
- Phylum: Arthropoda
- Class: Insecta
- Order: Lepidoptera
- Family: Sesiidae
- Genus: Metasphecia; Le Cerf, 1917
- Species: M. vuilleti

Binomial name
- Metasphecia vuilleti Le Cerf, 1917

Genus of moths

Metasphecia is a genus of moths in the family Sesiidae containing only one species, Metasphecia vuilleti, which is known from Senegal.
