= Similipepsis =

Scientific classification
- Kingdom: Animalia
- Phylum: Arthropoda
- Class: Insecta
- Order: Lepidoptera
- Family: Sesiidae
- Subfamily: Tinthiinae
- Genus: Similipepsis; Le Cerf, 1911

Species
- See text

Synonyms
- Vespaegeria Strand [1913]; Milisipepsis Gorbunov & Arita 1995

Genus of moths

Similipepsis is a genus of moths in the family Sesiidae.

== Species ==
- Similipepsis takizawai Arita & Špatenka, 1989
- Similipepsis yunnanensis Špatenka & Arita, 1992
- Similipepsis aurea Gaede, 1929
- Similipepsis ekisi Wang, 1984
- Similipepsis eumenidiformis Bartsch, 2008
- Similipepsis maromizaensis Bartsch, 2008
- Similipepsis osuni Bakowski & Kallies, 2008
- Similipepsis typica (Strand, [1913])
- Similipepsis violacea Le Cerf, 1911
- Similipepsis bicingulata Gorbunov & Arita, 1995
- Similipepsis helicella Kallies & Arita, 2001
- Similipepsis lasiocera Hampson, 1919
- Similipepsis taiwanensis (Arita & Gorbunov, 2001)
