= Cabomina tsomoana =

Scientific classification
- Kingdom: Animalia
- Phylum: Arthropoda
- Class: Insecta
- Order: Lepidoptera
- Family: Sesiidae
- Genus: Cabomina
- Species: C. tsomoana

Binomial name
- Cabomina tsomoana de Freina, 2011

Species of moth

Cabomina tsomoana is a moth of the family Sesiidae. It is known from South Africa.
