= Similipepsis typica =

Scientific classification
- Kingdom: Animalia
- Phylum: Arthropoda
- Class: Insecta
- Order: Lepidoptera
- Family: Sesiidae
- Genus: Similipepsis
- Species: S. typica

Binomial name
- Similipepsis typica (Strand, [1913])

Synonyms
- Vespaegeria typica Strand, 1913

Species of moth

Similipepsis typica is a moth of the family Sesiidae. It is known from Cameroon, Equatorial Guinea, Sierra Leone and Zimbabwe.
