= Malgassesia biedermanni =

Scientific classification
- Kingdom: Animalia
- Phylum: Arthropoda
- Class: Insecta
- Order: Lepidoptera
- Family: Sesiidae
- Genus: Malgassesia
- Species: M. biedermanni

Binomial name
- Malgassesia biedermanni Viette, 1982

Synonyms
- Malgasesia biedermanni

Species of moth

Malgassesia biedermanni is a moth of the family Sesiidae. It is known from Africa.
