= Leptaegeria =

Scientific classification
- Domain: Eukaryota
- Kingdom: Animalia
- Phylum: Arthropoda
- Class: Insecta
- Order: Lepidoptera
- Family: Sesiidae
- Tribe: Synanthedonini
- Genus: Leptaegeria; Le Cerf, 1916

Species
- See text

Genus of moths

Leptaegeria is a genus of moths in the family Sesiidae.

== Species ==
- Leptaegeria axiomnemoneuta Zukowsky, 1936
- Leptaegeria cillutincariensis Zukowsky, 1936
- Leptaegeria costalimai Köhler, 1953
- Leptaegeria flavocastanea Le Cerf, 1916
- Leptaegeria harti (Druce, 1899)
- Leptaegeria schreiteri Köhler, 1941
