= Malgassesia ankaratralis =

Scientific classification
- Kingdom: Animalia
- Phylum: Arthropoda
- Class: Insecta
- Order: Lepidoptera
- Family: Sesiidae
- Genus: Malgassesia
- Species: M. ankaratralis

Binomial name
- Malgassesia ankaratralis Viette, 1957

Synonyms
- Malgasesia ankaratralis

Species of moth

Malgassesia ankaratralis is a moth of the family Sesiidae. It is known from Madagascar.
