= Ceritrypetes =

Scientific classification
- Kingdom: Animalia
- Phylum: Arthropoda
- Class: Insecta
- Order: Lepidoptera
- Family: Sesiidae
- Subfamily: Sesiinae
- Genus: Ceritrypetes; Bradley, 1956

Species
- See text

Genus of moths

Ceritrypetes is a genus of moths in the family Sesiidae.

== Species ==
- Ceritrypetes idiotropha Bradley, 1956
