= Uranothyris =

Scientific classification
- Kingdom: Animalia
- Phylum: Arthropoda
- Class: Insecta
- Order: Lepidoptera
- Family: Sesiidae
- Subfamily: Sesiinae
- Genus: Uranothyris; Meyrick, 1933

Species
- See text

Genus of moths

Uranothyris is a genus of moths in the family Sesiidae.

== Species ==
- Uranothyris pterotarsa Meyrick, 1933
