= Euhagena palariformis =

Scientific classification
- Kingdom: Animalia
- Phylum: Arthropoda
- Class: Insecta
- Order: Lepidoptera
- Family: Sesiidae
- Genus: Euhagena
- Species: E. palariformis

Binomial name
- Euhagena palariformis (Lederer, 1858)

Synonyms
- Sesia palariformis Lederer, 1858; Sesia dioctriiformis Romanoff, 1884; Sesia palariformis var. rubrescens Staudinger 1887; Sesia almana Rebel, 1917; Dipsosphecia palariformis nazir f. rubefacta Le Cerf, 1938

Species of moth

Euhagena palariformis is a moth of the family Sesiidae. It is found in Turkey, Azerbaijan, Armenia, Iran, Iraq, Syria and Lebanon.

Adults are on wing in early summer.

The larvae probably feed on Eryngium species.

== Subspecies ==
- Euhagena palariformis palariformis (Asia Minor, Syria, Lebanon, Iraq, Armenia)
- Euhagena palariformis nazir (Le Cerf, 1938) (Azerbaijan)
