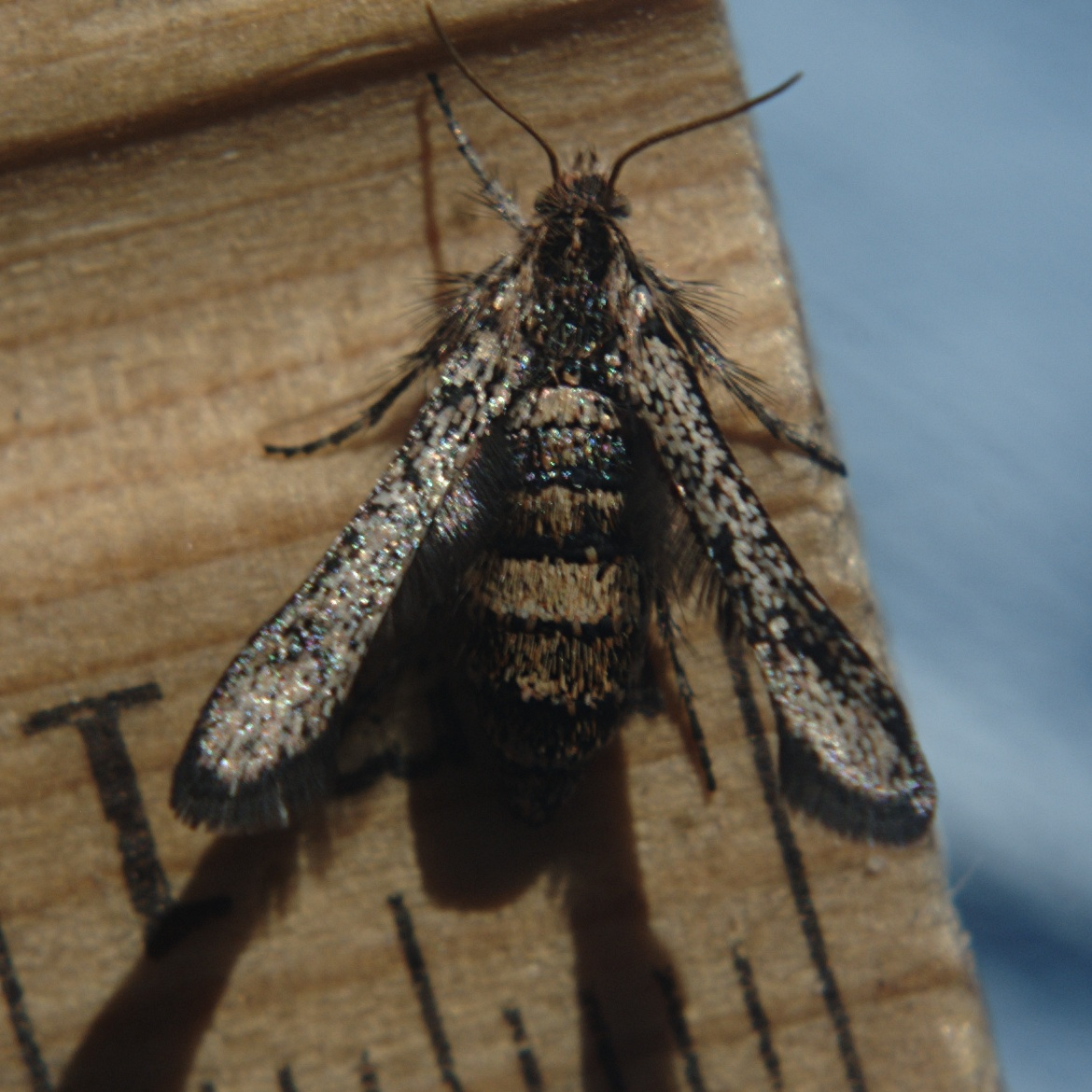

Scientific classification
- Domain: Eukaryota
- Kingdom: Animalia
- Phylum: Arthropoda
- Class: Insecta
- Order: Lepidoptera
- Family: Sesiidae
- Genus: Zenodoxus
- Species: Z. canescens

Binomial name
- Zenodoxus canescens H. Edwards, 1881

Synonyms
- Zenodoxus canescens f. sidae Engelhardt 1946

= Zenodoxus canescens =

Species of moth

Zenodoxus canescens is a moth of the family Sesiidae. It was described by Henry Edwards in 1881. It is known from North America, including Colorado, Arizona, California and New Mexico.
