= Lenyrhova =

Scientific classification
- Kingdom: Animalia
- Phylum: Arthropoda
- Clade: Pancrustacea
- Class: Insecta
- Order: Lepidoptera
- Family: Sesiidae
- Tribe: Sesiini
- Genus: Lenyrhova; Le Cerf, 1957
- Species: L. heckmanniae

Binomial name
- Lenyrhova heckmanniae (Aurivillius, 1909)

Synonyms
- Lenyra heckmanniae Aurivillius, 1909

Genus of moths

Lenyrhova is a genus of moths in the family Sesiidae which is known from eastern Madagascar.

It is a monotypic genus and its only known species is Lenyrhova heckmanniae, which has a wingspan of 47mm and a body length of 26mm.
