= Micrecia =

Scientific classification
- Kingdom: Animalia
- Phylum: Arthropoda
- Class: Insecta
- Order: Lepidoptera
- Family: Sesiidae
- Subfamily: Tinthiinae
- Genus: Micrecia; Hampson, 1919

Species
- See text

Genus of moths

Micrecia is a genus of moths in the family Sesiidae.

== Species ==
- Micrecia methyalina Hampson, 1919
- Micrecia capillaria Kallies, 2020
- Micrecia hawkei Kallies, 2020
- Micrecia kuukuyau Kallies, 2020
