= Madasphecia griveaudi =

Scientific classification
- Kingdom: Animalia
- Phylum: Arthropoda
- Class: Insecta
- Order: Lepidoptera
- Family: Sesiidae
- Genus: Madasphecia
- Species: M. griveaudi

Binomial name
- Madasphecia griveaudi (Viette, 1982)

Synonyms
- Sura griveaudi Viette, 1982

Species of moth

Madasphecia griveaudi is a moth of the family Sesiidae. It is found in south-western Madagascar. It is only known from its male holotype that was caught at the Mahafaly Plateau.
