= Euhagena =

Scientific classification
- Domain: Eukaryota
- Kingdom: Animalia
- Phylum: Arthropoda
- Class: Insecta
- Order: Lepidoptera
- Family: Sesiidae
- Subfamily: Sesiinae
- Tribe: Paranthrenini
- Genus: Euhagena; Edwards, 1881

Species
- See text

Genus of moths

Euhagena is a genus of moths in the family Sesiidae.

== Species ==
- Euhagena palariformis (Lederer, 1858)
  - Euhagena palariformis palariformis (Lederer, 1858)
  - Euhagena palariformis nazir (Le Cerf, 1938)
- Euhagena emphytiformis (Walker, 1856)
- Euhagena nebraskae Edwards, 1881
- Euhagena leucozona (Hampson, 1919)
- Euhagena variegata (Walker, [1865])
