= Microsynanthedon setodiformis =

Scientific classification
- Domain: Eukaryota
- Kingdom: Animalia
- Phylum: Arthropoda
- Class: Insecta
- Order: Lepidoptera
- Family: Sesiidae
- Genus: Microsynanthedon
- Species: M. setodiformis

Binomial name
- Microsynanthedon setodiformis (Mabille, 1891)

Synonyms
- Sesia setodiformis Mabille, 1891

Species of moth

Microsynanthedon setodiformis is a moth of the family Sesiidae. It is known from Madagascar.
