= Lophocnema =

Scientific classification
- Kingdom: Animalia
- Phylum: Arthropoda
- Class: Insecta
- Order: Lepidoptera
- Family: Sesiidae
- Subfamily: Tinthiinae
- Genus: Lophocnema; Turner, 1917

Species
- See text

Genus of moths

Lophocnema is a genus of moths in the family Sesiidae.

== Species ==
- Lophocnema eusphyra Turner, 1917
