= Cabomina heliostoma =

Scientific classification
- Kingdom: Animalia
- Phylum: Arthropoda
- Class: Insecta
- Order: Lepidoptera
- Family: Sesiidae
- Genus: Cabomina
- Species: C. heliostoma

Binomial name
- Cabomina heliostoma (Meyrick, 1926)

Synonyms
- Chamanthedon heliostoma Meyrick, 1926

Species of moth

Cabomina heliostoma is a moth of the family Sesiidae. It is known from South Africa.
