= Malgassesia seyrigi =

Scientific classification
- Kingdom: Animalia
- Phylum: Arthropoda
- Class: Insecta
- Order: Lepidoptera
- Family: Sesiidae
- Genus: Malgassesia
- Species: M. seyrigi

Binomial name
- Malgassesia seyrigi Viette, 1955

Synonyms
- Malgasesia seyrigi

Species of moth

Malgassesia seyrigi is a moth of the family Sesiidae. It is known from northern Madagascar.

The wingspan of this species is 17 mm with a length of the forewings of 8 mm. The forewings are blackish, hindwings are hyaline (glass like). The holotype was collected by A. Seyrig at the Montagne d'Ambre.
