= Aegerosphecia =

Scientific classification
- Domain: Eukaryota
- Kingdom: Animalia
- Phylum: Arthropoda
- Class: Insecta
- Order: Lepidoptera
- Family: Sesiidae
- Tribe: Sesiini
- Genus: Aegerosphecia; Le Cerf, 1916

Species
- See text

Genus of moths

Aegerosphecia is a genus of moths in the family Sesiidae.

== Species ==
- Aegerosphecia calliptera Le Cerf, 1916
- Aegerosphecia cyanea Hampson, 1919
- Aegerosphecia fasciata (Walker, 1862)
- Aegerosphecia fulviventris Le Cerf, 1916
- Aegerosphecia fumoptera Kallies & Arita, 2004a
- Aegerosphecia myanmarensis Kallies & Arita, 2004
- Aegerosphecia mysolica (Walker, [1865])
