= Lepidopoda sylphina =

Scientific classification
- Kingdom: Animalia
- Phylum: Arthropoda
- Class: Insecta
- Order: Lepidoptera
- Family: Sesiidae
- Genus: Lepidopoda
- Species: L. sylphina

Binomial name
- Lepidopoda sylphina Hampson, 1919

Species of moth

Lepidopoda sylphina is a moth of the family Sesiidae. It is known from Sierra Leone.
