= Ceratocorema =

Scientific classification
- Kingdom: Animalia
- Phylum: Arthropoda
- Class: Insecta
- Order: Lepidoptera
- Family: Sesiidae
- Subfamily: Tinthiinae
- Tribe: Tinthiini
- Genus: Ceratocorema; Hampson, [1893]

Species
- See text

Genus of moths

Ceratocorema is a genus of moths in the family Sesiidae.

== Species ==
- Ceratocorema antiphanopa (Meyrick, 1927)
- Ceratocorema cymbalistis (Meyrick, 1926)
- Ceratocorema hyalinum Kallies & Arita, 2001
- Ceratocorema mesatma (Meyrick, 1926)
- Ceratocorema postcristatum Hampson, [1893]
- Ceratocorema semihyalinum (Hampson, 1919)
- Ceratocorema yoshiyasui Kallies & Arita, 2001
