= Oligophlebia eusphyra =

Scientific classification
- Kingdom: Animalia
- Phylum: Arthropoda
- Class: Insecta
- Order: Lepidoptera
- Family: Sesiidae
- Genus: Oligophlebia
- Species: O. eusphyra

Binomial name
- Oligophlebia eusphyra (Turner, 1917)

Synonyms
- Lophocnema eusphyra Turner, 1917; Pennisetia eusphyra

Species of moth

Oligophlebia eusphyra is a moth of the family Sesiidae. It is only known from Kuranda in Queensland near Cairns.

The length of the forewings is about 6 mm for males and 8–9 for females.
