= Stenosphecia =

Scientific classification
- Kingdom: Animalia
- Phylum: Arthropoda
- Clade: Pancrustacea
- Class: Insecta
- Order: Lepidoptera
- Family: Sesiidae
- Tribe: Synanthedonini
- Genus: Stenosphecia; Le Cerf, 1917

Species
- See text

Genus of moths

Stenosphecia is a monotypic genus of moths in the family Sesiidae. Its sole species is Stenosphecia columbica. Both genus and species were described in 1917 by Ferdinand Le Cerf. It is found in the Neotropical realm.

== Original publication ==
Le Cerf, Ferdinand (1917). "Contributions à l'étude des Aegeriidae. Description et Iconographie d'Espèces et de Formes nouvelles ou peu connues". In Oberthür, Charles (ed.). Etudes de lépidoptérologie comparée 14. pp. 285–287.
