= Melanosphecia =

Scientific classification
- Domain: Eukaryota
- Kingdom: Animalia
- Phylum: Arthropoda
- Class: Insecta
- Order: Lepidoptera
- Family: Sesiidae
- Tribe: Osminiini
- Genus: Melanosphecia; Le Cerf, 1916

Species
- See text

Genus of moths

Melanosphecia is a genus of moths in the family Sesiidae.

== Species ==
- Melanosphecia atra Le Cerf, 1916
- Melanosphecia auricollis (Rothschild, 1912)
- Melanosphecia dohertyi Hampson, 1919
- Melanosphecia funebris (Rothschild, 1911)
