= Callithia =

Scientific classification
- Domain: Eukaryota
- Kingdom: Animalia
- Phylum: Arthropoda
- Class: Insecta
- Order: Lepidoptera
- Family: Sesiidae
- Tribe: Osminiini
- Genus: Callithia; Le Cerf, 1916

Species
- See text

Genus of moths

Callithia is a genus of moths in the family Sesiidae.

== Species ==
- Callithia oberthueri Le Cerf, 1916
