= Rodolphia =

Scientific classification
- Kingdom: Animalia
- Phylum: Arthropoda
- Class: Insecta
- Order: Lepidoptera
- Family: Sesiidae
- Genus: Rodolphia; Le Cerf, 1911
- Species: R. hombergi

Binomial name
- Rodolphia hombergi Le Cerf, 1911

Genus of moths

Rodolphia is a genus of moths in the family Sesiidae containing only one species, Rodolphia hombergi, which is known from Madagascar.

The species Rodolphia hombergi is highly distinctive and sexually dimorphic. The four Bekily specimens under examination are part of a sizable homogenous series that was captured at the same location and time. There is no question about the conspecificity of the females in this series because they closely resemble the female holotype in terms of size and coloring. This series was also the basis for Viette's description of the male. Malgassesia pauliani Viette, 1955 syn. nov. male holotype is a very damaged, greasy specimen. It can be challenging to tell, but the labial palps, wings, and abdomen are identical in structure and color to the males from Bekily. Additionally, all of the specimens under examination were collected in southern Madagascar, fewer than 180 kilometers away from one another.
