= Malgassesia milloti =

Scientific classification
- Kingdom: Animalia
- Phylum: Arthropoda
- Clade: Pancrustacea
- Class: Insecta
- Order: Lepidoptera
- Family: Sesiidae
- Genus: Malgassesia
- Species: M. milloti

Binomial name
- Malgassesia milloti Viette, 1982

Synonyms
- Malgasesia milloti

Species of moth

Malgassesia milloti is a moth of the family Sesiidae. It is known from Africa.
