= Hovaesia =

Scientific classification
- Kingdom: Animalia
- Phylum: Arthropoda
- Class: Insecta
- Order: Lepidoptera
- Family: Sesiidae
- Tribe: Sesiini
- Genus: Hovaesia; Le Cerf, 1957
- Species: H. donckieri

Binomial name
- Hovaesia donckieri (Le Cerf, 1912)

Synonyms
- Sesia donckieri Le Cerf, 1912

Genus of moths

Hovaesia is a genus of moths in the family Sesiidae containing only one species, Hovaesia donckieri, which is known from Madagascar.
