= Microsynanthedon tanala =

Scientific classification
- Kingdom: Animalia
- Phylum: Arthropoda
- Clade: Pancrustacea
- Class: Insecta
- Order: Lepidoptera
- Family: Sesiidae
- Genus: Microsynanthedon
- Species: M. tanala

Binomial name
- Microsynanthedon tanala Minet, 1976

Species of moth

Microsynanthedon tanala is a moth of the family Sesiidae. It is found in Africa.
