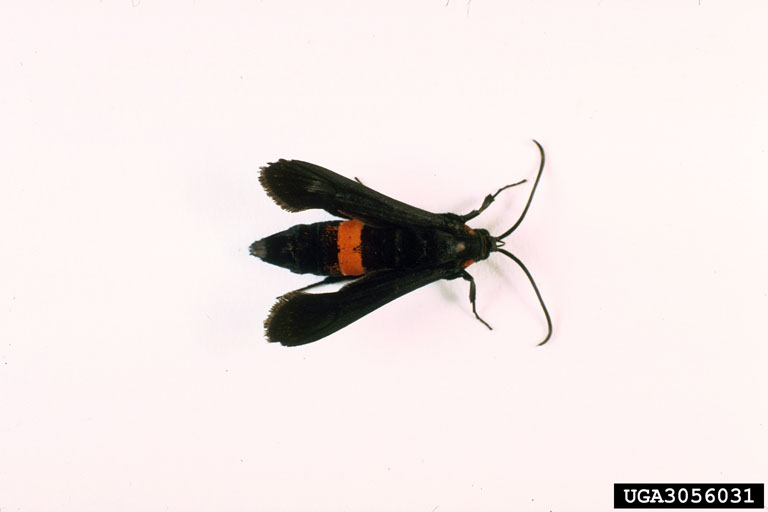

Scientific classification
- Kingdom: Animalia
- Phylum: Arthropoda
- Class: Insecta
- Order: Lepidoptera
- Family: Sesiidae
- Genus: Sannina
- Species: S. uroceriformis

Binomial name
- Sannina uroceriformis Walker, 1856

Synonyms
- Aegeria quinquecaudata Ridings, 1862; Saunina uroceripennis Boisduval, [1875] (unnecessary replacement name for Sannina uroceriformis)

= Sannina uroceriformis =

Species of moth

Sannina uroceriformis, the persimmon borer, is a moth of the family Sesiidae. It is found along the Atlantic coast of the United States, from New Jersey to Florida and westward to Texas, Oklahoma, Missouri, Kansas, Ohio and Indiana.

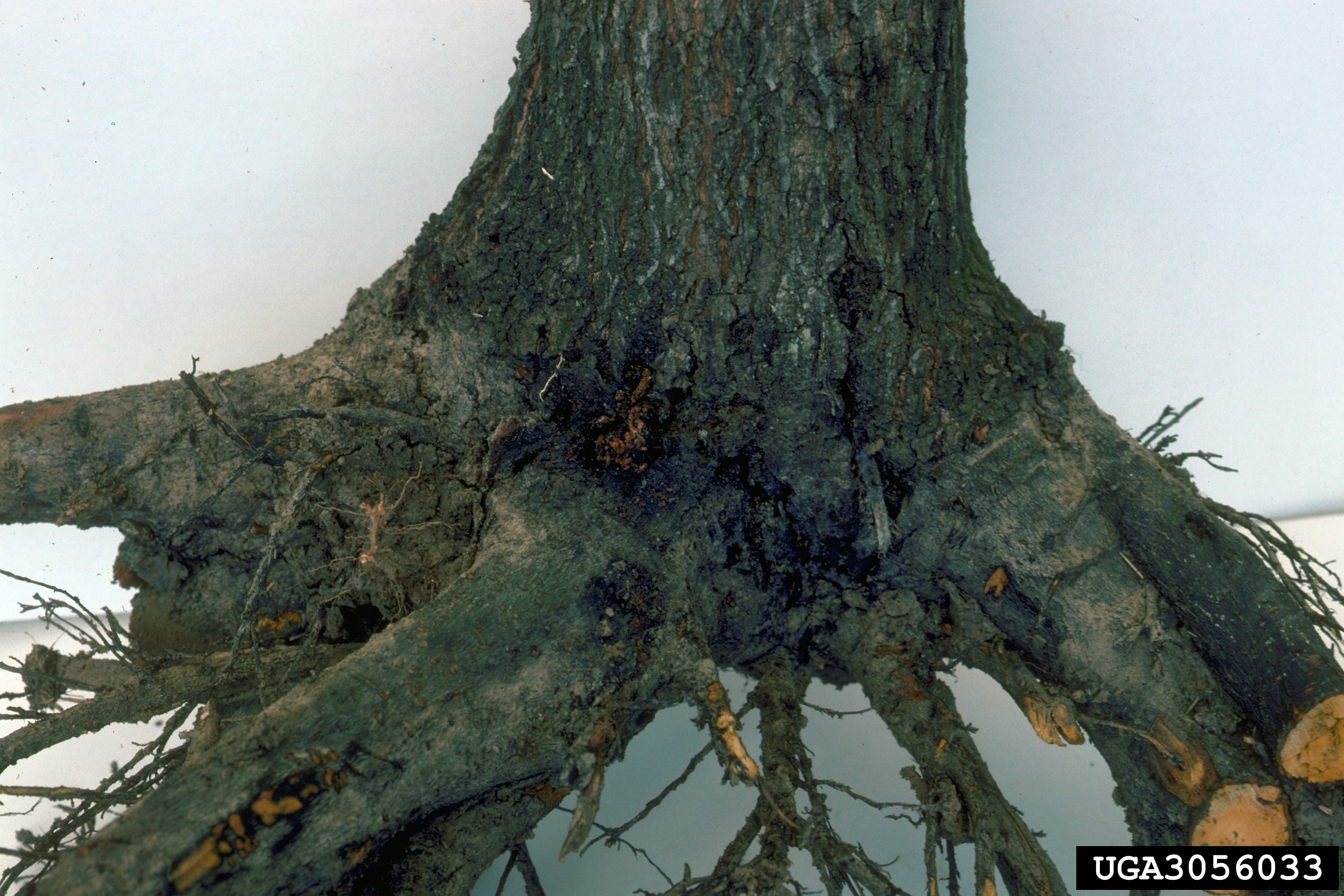
Damage

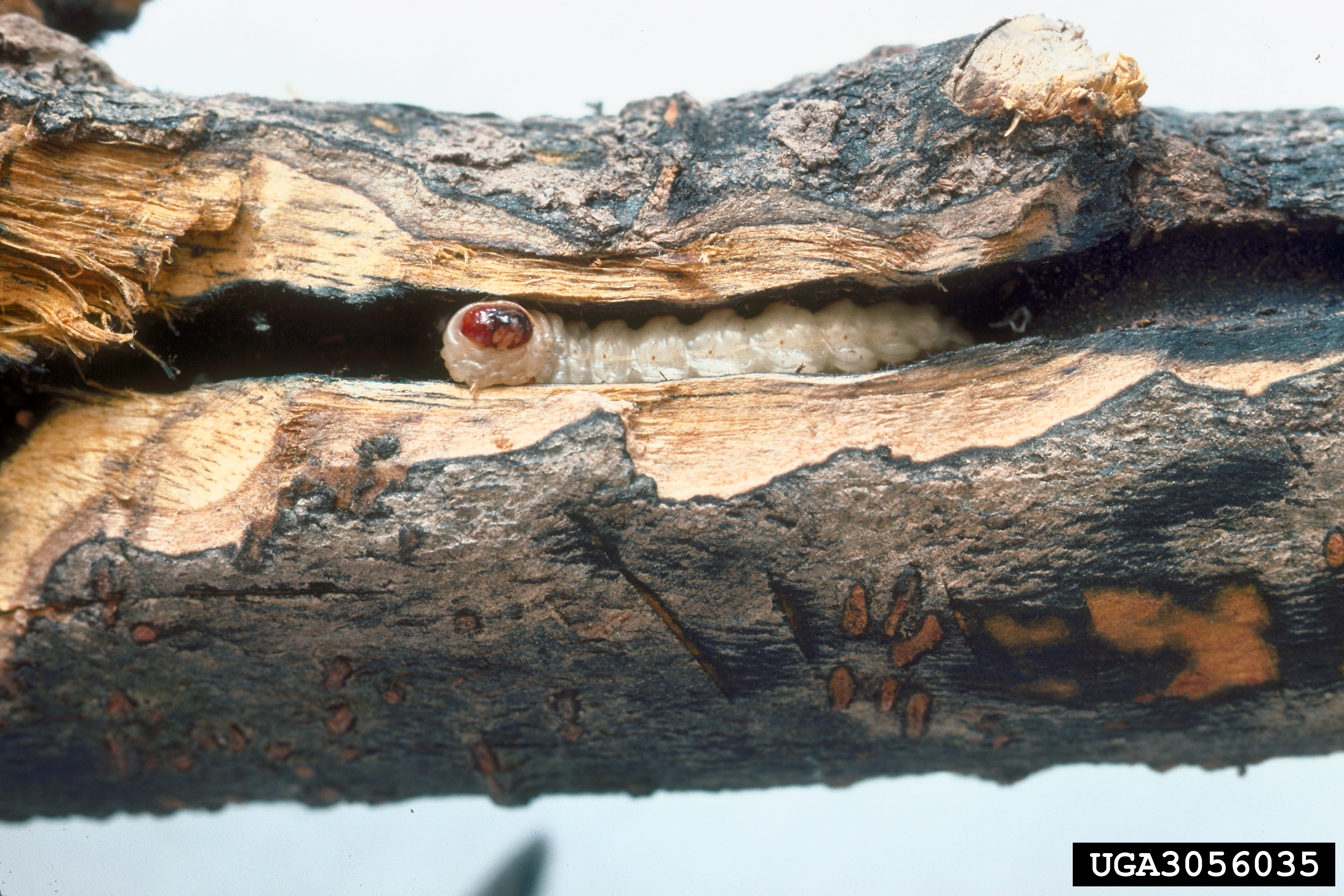
Larva

The wingspan is 28–32 mm, with the female being slightly larger than male.
