= Conopyga =

Scientific classification
- Kingdom: Animalia
- Phylum: Arthropoda
- Class: Insecta
- Order: Lepidoptera
- Family: Sesiidae
- Subfamily: Sesiinae
- Genus: Conopyga; Felder, 1861

Species
- See text

Genus of moths

Conopyga is a genus of moths in the family Sesiidae.

== Species ==
- Conopyga metallescens Felder, 1861
