= Zhuosesia =

Scientific classification
- Kingdom: Animalia
- Phylum: Arthropoda
- Class: Insecta
- Order: Lepidoptera
- Family: Sesiidae
- Subfamily: Sesiinae
- Genus: Zhuosesia; Yang, 1977

Species
- See text

Genus of moths

Zhuosesia is a genus of moths in the family Sesiidae.

== Species ==
- Zhuosesia zhuoxiana Yang, 1977
