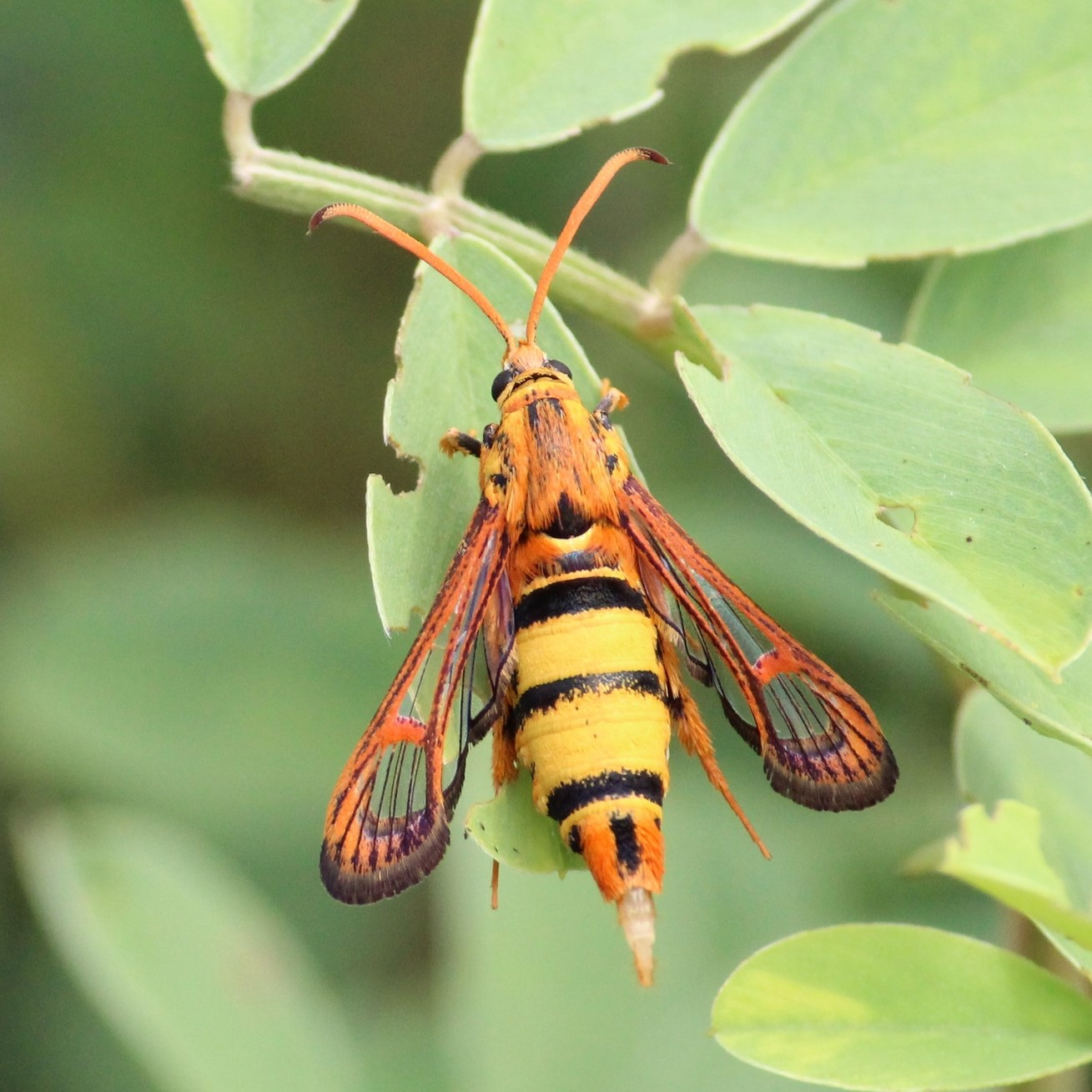
- Lepidopoda heterogyna

Scientific classification
- Kingdom: Animalia
- Phylum: Arthropoda
- Class: Insecta
- Order: Lepidoptera
- Family: Sesiidae
- Subfamily: Sesiinae
- Genus: Lepidopoda; Hampson, 1900

Species
- See text

= Lepidopoda =

Genus of moths

Lepidopoda is a genus of moths in the family Sesiidae.

== Species ==
- Lepidopoda sylphina Hampson, 1919
- Lepidopoda andrepiclera Hampson, 1910
- Lepidopoda heterogyna Hampson, 1900
- Lepidopoda lutescens Diakonoff, [1968]
