= Austrosetia =

Scientific classification
- Kingdom: Animalia
- Phylum: Arthropoda
- Clade: Pancrustacea
- Class: Insecta
- Order: Lepidoptera
- Family: Sesiidae
- Genus: Austrosetia; Felder, 1874
- Species: A. semirufa

Binomial name
- Austrosetia semirufa Felder, 1874

Synonyms
- Synanthedon semirufa (Felder, 1874)

Genus of moths

Austrosetia is a genus of moths in the family Sesiidae containing only one species, Austrosetia semirufa, which is known from South Africa.
