= Kemneriella =

Scientific classification
- Kingdom: Animalia
- Phylum: Arthropoda
- Class: Insecta
- Order: Lepidoptera
- Family: Sesiidae
- Tribe: Synanthedonini
- Genus: Kemneriella; Bryk, 1947

Species
- See text

Genus of moths

Kemneriella is a genus of moths in the family Sesiidae.

== Species ==
- Kemneriella malaiseorum Bryk, 1947
