= Calasesia =

Scientific classification
- Kingdom: Animalia
- Phylum: Arthropoda
- Class: Insecta
- Order: Lepidoptera
- Family: Sesiidae
- Tribe: Osminiini
- Genus: Calasesia; Beutenmüller, 1899

Species
- See text

Genus of moths

Calasesia is a genus of moths in the family Sesiidae.

== Species ==
- Calasesia coccinea (Beutenmüller, 1898)
