= Cyanophlebia =

Scientific classification
- Kingdom: Animalia
- Phylum: Arthropoda
- Clade: Pancrustacea
- Class: Insecta
- Order: Lepidoptera
- Family: Sesiidae
- Subfamily: Tinthiinae
- Genus: Cyanophlebia; Arita & Gorbunov, 2001

Species
- See text

Genus of moths

Cyanophlebia is a genus of moths in the family Sesiidae.

== Species ==
- Cyanophlebia mandarina Arita & Gorbunov, 2001
