= Paranthrenella =

Scientific classification
- Kingdom: Animalia
- Phylum: Arthropoda
- Clade: Pancrustacea
- Class: Insecta
- Order: Lepidoptera
- Family: Sesiidae
- Tribe: Synanthedonini
- Genus: Paranthrenella; Strand, 1916

Species
- See text

Genus of moths

Paranthrenella is a genus of moths in the family Sesiidae.

== Species ==
- Paranthrenella koshiensis Gorbunov & Arita, 1999
- Paranthrenella albipuncta Gorbunov & Arita, 2000
- Paranthrenella cinnamoma Yu, Gao, Kallies, Arita & Wang, 2021
- Paranthrenella dortmundi Liang & Hsu, 2015
- Paranthrenella duporti (Le Cerf, 1927)
- Paranthrenella formosicola (Strand, 1916)
- Paranthrenella helvola Liang & Hsu, 2019
- Paranthrenella mushana (Matsumura, 1931)
- Paranthrenella pensilis (Swinhoe, 1892)
- Paranthrenella phasiaeformis (Felder, 1861)
- Paranthrenella similis Gorbunov & Arita, 2000
- Paranthrenella subauratus (Le Cerf, 1916)
- Paranthrenella weiyui Liang & Hsu, 2015
- Paranthrenella auriplena (Walker, 1865)
- Paranthrenella brandti Kallies, 2020
- Paranthrenella chrysophanes (Meyrick, 1887)
- Paranthrenella lelatensis Kallies, 2020
- Paranthrenella melanocera (Hampson, 1919)
- Paranthrenella terminalia Kallies, 2020
- Paranthrenella xanthogyna (Hampson, 1919)
