= Isothamnis =

Scientific classification
- Kingdom: Animalia
- Phylum: Arthropoda
- Class: Insecta
- Order: Lepidoptera
- Family: Sesiidae
- Subfamily: Tinthiinae
- Genus: Isothamnis; Meyrick, 1935

Species
- See text

Genus of moths

Isothamnis is a genus of moths in the family Sesiidae.

== Species ==
- Isothamnis prisciformis (Meyrick, 1935)
