= Ichneumonella =

Scientific classification
- Kingdom: Animalia
- Phylum: Arthropoda
- Clade: Pancrustacea
- Class: Insecta
- Order: Lepidoptera
- Family: Sesiidae
- Tribe: Synanthedonini
- Genus: Ichneumonella; Gorbunov & Arita, 2005

Species
- See text

Genus of moths

Ichneumonella is a genus of moths in the family Sesiidae.

== Species ==
- Ichneumonella hyaloptera Gorbunov & Arita, 2005
- Ichneumonella viridiflava Gorbunov & Arita, 2005
