= Chimaerosphecia =

Scientific classification
- Domain: Eukaryota
- Kingdom: Animalia
- Phylum: Arthropoda
- Class: Insecta
- Order: Lepidoptera
- Family: Sesiidae
- Tribe: Cisuvorini
- Genus: Chimaerosphecia; Strand, [1916]

Species
- See text

Genus of moths

Chimaerosphecia is a genus of moths in the family Sesiidae.

== Species ==
- Chimaerosphecia aegerides Strand, [1916]
- Chimaerosphecia colochelyna Bryk, 1947
- Chimaerosphecia sinensis (Walker, [1865])
