= Cephalomelittia =

Scientific classification
- Kingdom: Animalia
- Phylum: Arthropoda
- Clade: Pancrustacea
- Class: Insecta
- Order: Lepidoptera
- Family: Sesiidae
- Tribe: Melittiini
- Genus: Cephalomelittia; Gorbunov & Arita, 1995

Species
- See text

Genus of moths

Cephalomelittia is a genus of moths in the family Sesiidae.

== Species ==
- Cephalomelittia tabaniformis Gorbunov & Arita, 1995
