= Kantipuria =

Scientific classification
- Kingdom: Animalia
- Phylum: Arthropoda
- Clade: Pancrustacea
- Class: Insecta
- Order: Lepidoptera
- Family: Sesiidae
- Tribe: Synanthedonini
- Genus: Kantipuria; Gorbunov & Arita, 1999

Species
- See text

Genus of moths

Kantipuria is a genus of moths in the family Sesiidae.

== Species ==
- Kantipuria lyu Gorbunov & Arita, 1999
