= Madasphecia =

Scientific classification
- Kingdom: Animalia
- Phylum: Arthropoda
- Class: Insecta
- Order: Lepidoptera
- Family: Sesiidae
- Tribe: Sesiini
- Genus: Madasphecia; Viette, 1982

Species
- See text

Genus of moths

Madasphecia is a genus of moths in the family Sesiidae.

== Species ==
- Madasphecia griveaudi (Viette, 1982)
- Madasphecia puera (Viette, 1957)
