= Taikona =

Scientific classification
- Kingdom: Animalia
- Phylum: Arthropoda
- Clade: Pancrustacea
- Class: Insecta
- Order: Lepidoptera
- Family: Sesiidae
- Tribe: Paranthrenini
- Genus: Taikona; Arita & Gorbunov, 2001
- Species: T. matsumurai

Binomial name
- Taikona matsumurai Arita & Gorbunov 2001

Genus of moths

Taikona is a genus of moths in the family Sesiidae. It contains the single species Taikona matsumurai.
