= Phlogothauma =

Scientific classification
- Kingdom: Animalia
- Phylum: Arthropoda
- Class: Insecta
- Order: Lepidoptera
- Family: Sesiidae
- Tribe: Paranthrenini
- Genus: Phlogothauma; Butler, 1882

Species
- See text

Genus of moths

Phlogothauma is a genus of moths in the family Sesiidae.

== Species ==
The genus includes the following species:

- Phlogothauma scintillans Butler, 1882
