= Anthedonella =

Scientific classification
- Kingdom: Animalia
- Phylum: Arthropoda
- Clade: Pancrustacea
- Class: Insecta
- Order: Lepidoptera
- Family: Sesiidae
- Tribe: Synanthedonini
- Genus: Anthedonella; Gorbunov & Arita, 1999

Species
- See text

Genus of moths

Anthedonella is a genus of moths in the family Sesiidae.

== Species ==
- Anthedonella flavida Gorbunov & Arita, 2000
- Anthedonella ignicauda (Hampson, 1919)
- Anthedonella jinghongensis (Yang & Wang, 1989)
- Anthedonella opalizans (Hampson, 1919)
- Anthedonella polyphaga Gorbunov & Arita, 1999
- Anthedonella subtillima (Bryk, 1947)
- Anthedonella theobroma (Bradley, 1957)
