= Clavigera =

Scientific classification
- Kingdom: Animalia
- Phylum: Arthropoda
- Clade: Pancrustacea
- Class: Insecta
- Order: Lepidoptera
- Family: Sesiidae
- Tribe: Sesiini
- Genus: Clavigera; Kallies & Arita, 2004

Species
- See text

Genus of moths

Clavigera is a genus of moths in the family Sesiidae.

== Species ==
- Clavigera chrysoptera (Hampson, 1919)
- Clavigera pugnax (Meyrick, 1926)
