= Gasterostena =

Scientific classification
- Kingdom: Animalia
- Phylum: Arthropoda
- Clade: Pancrustacea
- Class: Insecta
- Order: Lepidoptera
- Family: Sesiidae
- Subfamily: Tinthiinae
- Genus: Gasterostena; Arita & Gorbunov, 2003

Species
- See text

Genus of moths

Gasterostena is a genus of moths in the family Sesiidae.

== Species ==
- Gasterostena funebris Kallies & Arita, 2006
- Gasterostena ikedai Arita & Gorbunov, 2003
- Gasterostena rubricincta Kallies & Arita, 2006
- Gasterostena vietnamica Arita & Gorbunov, 2003
