= Penstemonia =

Scientific classification
- Domain: Eukaryota
- Kingdom: Animalia
- Phylum: Arthropoda
- Class: Insecta
- Order: Lepidoptera
- Family: Sesiidae
- Tribe: Synanthedonini
- Genus: Penstemonia; Engelhardt, 1946

Species
- See text

Genus of moths

Penstemonia is a genus of moths in the family Sesiidae.

== Species ==
- Penstemonia clarkei Engelhardt, 1946
- Penstemonia dammersi Engelhardt, 1946
- Penstemonia edwardsii (Beutenmüller, 1894)
- Penstemonia hennei Engelhardt, 1946
- Penstemonia pappi Eichlin, 1987
