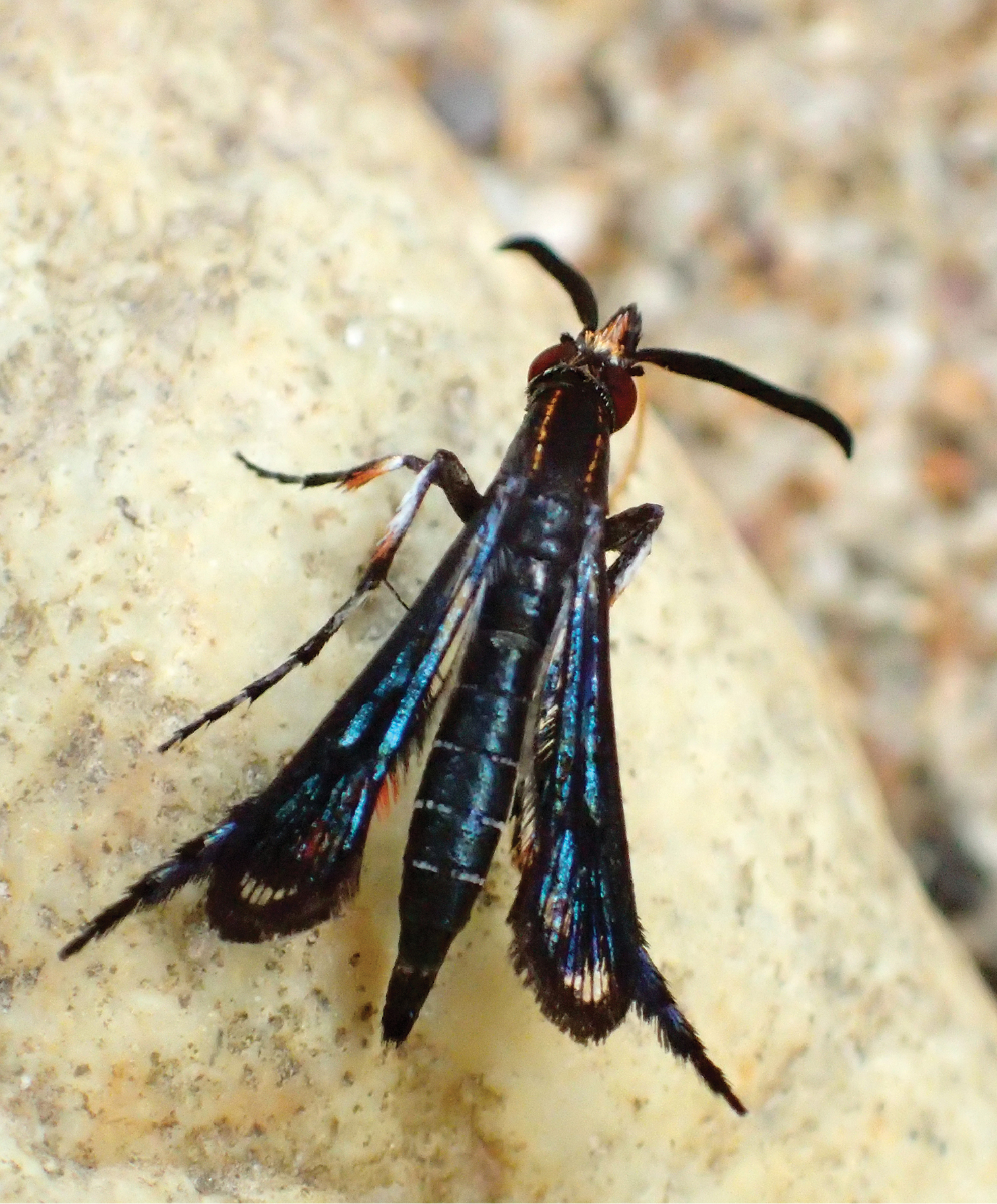

Scientific classification
- Kingdom: Animalia
- Phylum: Arthropoda
- Clade: Pancrustacea
- Class: Insecta
- Order: Lepidoptera
- Family: Sesiidae
- Tribe: Osminiini
- Genus: Pyrophleps; Arita & Gorbunov, 2000

Species
- See text

= Pyrophleps =

Genus of moths

Pyrophleps is a genus of moths in the family Sesiidae.

== Species ==
- Pyrophleps ellawi Skowron Volponi, 2017
- Pyrophleps nigripennis Arita & Gorbunov, 2000
- Pyrophleps vitripennis Arita & Gorbunov, 2000
- Pyrophleps zamesovi Gorbunov, 2021
