= Cabomina =

Scientific classification
- Domain: Eukaryota
- Kingdom: Animalia
- Phylum: Arthropoda
- Class: Insecta
- Order: Lepidoptera
- Family: Sesiidae
- Tribe: Osminiini
- Genus: Cabomina de Freina, 2008

Species
- See text

Genus of moths

Cabomina is a genus of moths in the family Sesiidae.

== Species ==
- Cabomina dracomontana de Freina, 2008
- Cabomina heliostoma (Meyrick, 1926)
- Cabomina monicae de Freina, 2008
- Cabomina tsomoana de Freina, 2011
