= Desmopoda =

Scientific classification
- Kingdom: Animalia
- Phylum: Arthropoda
- Class: Insecta
- Order: Lepidoptera
- Family: Sesiidae
- Tribe: Melittiini
- Genus: Desmopoda; Felder, 1874

Species
- See text

Genus of moths

Desmopoda is a genus of moths in the family Sesiidae.

== Species ==
- Desmopoda bombiformis Felder, 1874
