= Scasiba =

Scientific classification
- Domain: Eukaryota
- Kingdom: Animalia
- Phylum: Arthropoda
- Class: Insecta
- Order: Lepidoptera
- Family: Sesiidae
- Tribe: Sesiini
- Genus: Scasiba; Matsumura, 1931

Species
- See text

Genus of moths

Scasiba is a genus of moths in the family Sesiidae.

== Species ==
- Scasiba okinawana (Matsumura, 1931)
- Scasiba rhynchioides (Butler, 1881)
- Scasiba scribai (Bartel, 1912)
- Scasiba sheni (Arita & Xu, 1994)
- Scasiba difficilis Kallies & Arita, 2004
- Scasiba taikanensis (Matsumura, 1931)
- Scasiba tenuimarginata (Hampson, [1893])
