= Dasysphecia =

Scientific classification
- Kingdom: Animalia
- Phylum: Arthropoda
- Class: Insecta
- Order: Lepidoptera
- Family: Sesiidae
- Tribe: Cisuvorini
- Genus: Dasysphecia; Hampson, 1919

Species
- See text

Genus of moths

Dasysphecia is a genus of moths in the family Sesiidae.

== Species ==
- Dasysphecia bombyliformis (Rothschild, 1911)
- Dasysphecia bombylina Arita & Kallies, 2005
- Dasysphecia ursina Kallies & Arita, 2005
