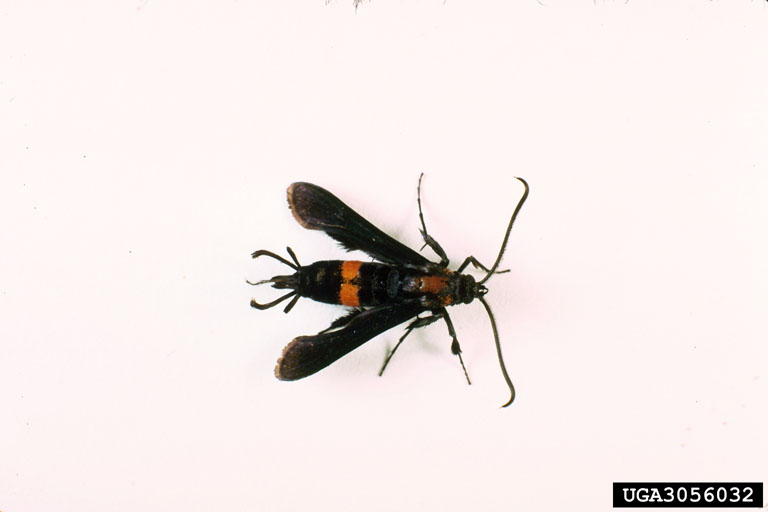
- Sannina uroceriformis

Scientific classification
- Kingdom: Animalia
- Phylum: Arthropoda
- Class: Insecta
- Order: Lepidoptera
- Family: Sesiidae
- Tribe: Synanthedonini
- Genus: Sannina; Walker, 1856

Species
- See text

= Sannina =

Genus of moths

Sannina is a genus of moths in the family Sesiidae.

== Species ==
- Sannina uroceriformis Walker, 1856
