= Microsynanthedon =

Scientific classification
- Kingdom: Animalia
- Phylum: Arthropoda
- Class: Insecta
- Order: Lepidoptera
- Family: Sesiidae
- Tribe: Osminiini
- Genus: Microsynanthedon; Viette, [1955]

Species
- See text

Genus of moths

Microsynanthedon is a genus of moths in the family Sesiidae.

== Species ==
- Microsynanthedon ambrensis Viette, [1955]
- Microsynanthedon setodiformis (Mabille, 1891)
- Microsynanthedon tanala Minet, 1976
