= Sincara =

Scientific classification
- Kingdom: Animalia
- Phylum: Arthropoda
- Class: Insecta
- Order: Lepidoptera
- Family: Sesiidae
- Tribe: Paranthrenini
- Genus: Sincara; Walker, 1856

Species
- See text

Genus of moths

Sincara is a genus of moths in the family Sesiidae.

== Species ==
- Sincara eumeniformis Walker, 1856
