= Hymenoclea (moth) =

Scientific classification
- Kingdom: Animalia
- Phylum: Arthropoda
- Class: Insecta
- Order: Lepidoptera
- Family: Sesiidae
- Tribe: Synanthedonini
- Genus: Hymenoclea; Engelhardt, 1946

Species
- See text

Genus of moths

Hymenoclea is a genus of moths in the family Sesiidae.

== Species ==
- Hymenoclea palmii (Beutenmüller, 1902)
