= Cyanosesia =

Scientific classification
- Kingdom: Animalia
- Phylum: Arthropoda
- Clade: Pancrustacea
- Class: Insecta
- Order: Lepidoptera
- Family: Sesiidae
- Tribe: Sesiini
- Genus: Cyanosesia; Gorbunov & Arita, 1995

Species
- See text

Genus of moths

Cyanosesia is a genus of moths in the family Sesiidae.

== Species ==
- Cyanosesia borneensis Kallies, 2003
- Cyanosesia cyanolampra (Diakonoff, [1968])
- Cyanosesia cyanosa Kallies & Arita, 2004
- Cyanosesia formosana Arita & Gorbunov, 2002
- Cyanosesia hypochalcia (Hampson, 1919)
- Cyanosesia javana Gorbunov & Kallies, 1998
- Cyanosesia litseavora Kallies & Arita, 2004
- Cyanosesia meyi Kallies & Arita, 1998
- Cyanosesia pelocroca (Diakonoff, [1968])
- Cyanosesia philippina Gorbunov & Kallies, 1998
- Cyanosesia tonkinensis Gorbunov & Arita, 1995
- Cyanosesia treadawayi Kallies & Arita, 1998
- Cyanosesia vietnamica Gorbunov & Arita, 1995
