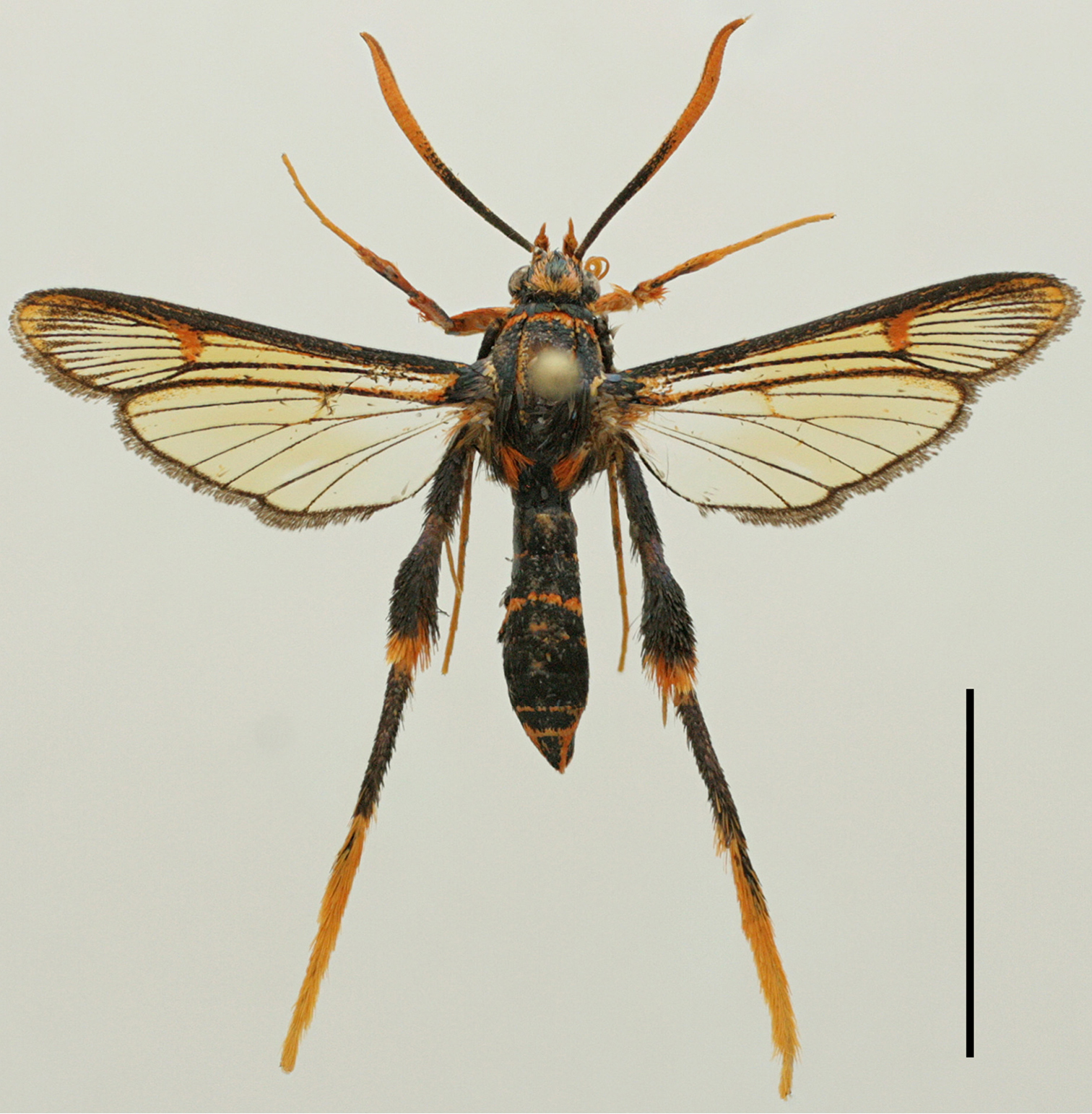
- Teinotarsina aurantiaca

Scientific classification
- Domain: Eukaryota
- Kingdom: Animalia
- Phylum: Arthropoda
- Class: Insecta
- Order: Lepidoptera
- Family: Sesiidae
- Tribe: Sesiini
- Genus: Teinotarsina; Felder, 1874

Species
- See text

= Teinotarsina =

Genus of moths

Teinotarsina is a genus of moths in the family Sesiidae.

== Species ==
- Teinotarsina aurantiaca Yagi, Hirowatari & Arita, 2016
- Teinotarsina flavicincta (Arita & Gorbunov, 2002)
- Teinotarsina litchivora (Yang & Wang, 1989)
- Teinotarsina longipes (Felder, 1861)
- Teinotarsina longitarsa Arita & Gorbunov, 2002
- Teinotarsina lushanensis (Xu & Liu, 1999)
- Teinotarsina luteopoda Kallies & Arita, 2004
- Teinotarsina melanostoma (Diakonoff, [1968])
- Teinotarsina micans (Diakonoff, [1968])
- Teinotarsina nonggangensis (Yang & Wang, 1989)
- Teinotarsina rubripes (Pagenstecher, 1900)
