= Afrokona =

Scientific classification
- Domain: Eukaryota
- Kingdom: Animalia
- Phylum: Arthropoda
- Class: Insecta
- Order: Lepidoptera
- Family: Sesiidae
- Tribe: Sesiini
- Genus: Afrokona; Fischer, 2006
- Species: A. aerea

Binomial name
- Afrokona aerea Fischer, 2006

Genus of moths

Afrokona is a monotypic genus of moths in the family Sesiidae. The only species is Afrokona aerea.
