= Akaisphecia =

Scientific classification
- Kingdom: Animalia
- Phylum: Arthropoda
- Clade: Pancrustacea
- Class: Insecta
- Order: Lepidoptera
- Family: Sesiidae
- Tribe: Osminiini
- Genus: Akaisphecia; Gorbunov & Arita, 1995
- Species: A. melanopuncta

Binomial name
- Akaisphecia melanopuncta Gorbunov & Arita, 1995

Genus of moths

Akaisphecia is a genus of moths in the family Sesiidae.

== Species ==
- Akaisphecia melanopuncta Gorbunov & Arita, 1995 – Vietnam
