= Scoliokona =

Scientific classification
- Kingdom: Animalia
- Phylum: Arthropoda
- Clade: Pancrustacea
- Class: Insecta
- Order: Lepidoptera
- Family: Sesiidae
- Tribe: Paranthrenini
- Genus: Scoliokona; Kallies & Arita, 1998

Species
- See text

Genus of moths

Scoliokona is a genus of moths in the family Sesiidae.

== Species ==
- Scoliokona baliensis Gorbunov, 2021
- Scoliokona cyanea (Hampson, 1919)
- Scoliokona cyanogama Meyrick, 1930
- Scoliokona heptapora Kallies & Arita, 1998
- Scoliokona hyalina Arita & Gorbunov, 2003
- Scoliokona kalliesi Arita & Riefenstahl, 2004
- Scoliokona nanlingensis Kallies & Arita, 2014
- Scoliokona phoenicia (Hampson, 1919)
- Scoliokona shimentai Kallies & Wu, 2014
- Scoliokona spissa Kallies & Arita, 2014
- Scoliokona stroehlei (Fischer, 2002)
- Scoliokona tetrapora (Diakonoff, 1968)
- Scoliokona uncariae (Schneider, 1940)
- Scoliokona zygophora (Hampson, 1919)
