= Ravitria =

Scientific classification
- Kingdom: Animalia
- Phylum: Arthropoda
- Clade: Pancrustacea
- Class: Insecta
- Order: Lepidoptera
- Family: Sesiidae
- Tribe: Synanthedonini
- Genus: Ravitria; Gorbunov & Arita, 2000

Species
- See text

Genus of moths

Ravitria is a genus of moths in the family Sesiidae.

== Species ==
- Ravitria aurifasciata (Gorbunov & Arita, 1995)
- Ravitria confusa (Gorbunov & Arita, 2000c)
- Ravitria pyrosema (Hampson, 1919)
- Ravitria sotchivkoi (Gorbunov & Arita, 1999)
- Ravitria yunnanensis Gorbunov & Arita, 2001
