= Schimia =

Scientific classification
- Kingdom: Animalia
- Phylum: Arthropoda
- Clade: Pancrustacea
- Class: Insecta
- Order: Lepidoptera
- Family: Sesiidae
- Tribe: Synanthedonini
- Genus: Schimia; Gorbunov & Arita, 1999

Species
- See text

Genus of moths

Schimia is a genus of moths in the family Sesiidae.

== Species ==
- Schimia flavipennis Gorbunov & Arita, 1999
- Schimia flava (Moore, 1879)
- Schimia tanakai Gorbunov & Arita, 2000
