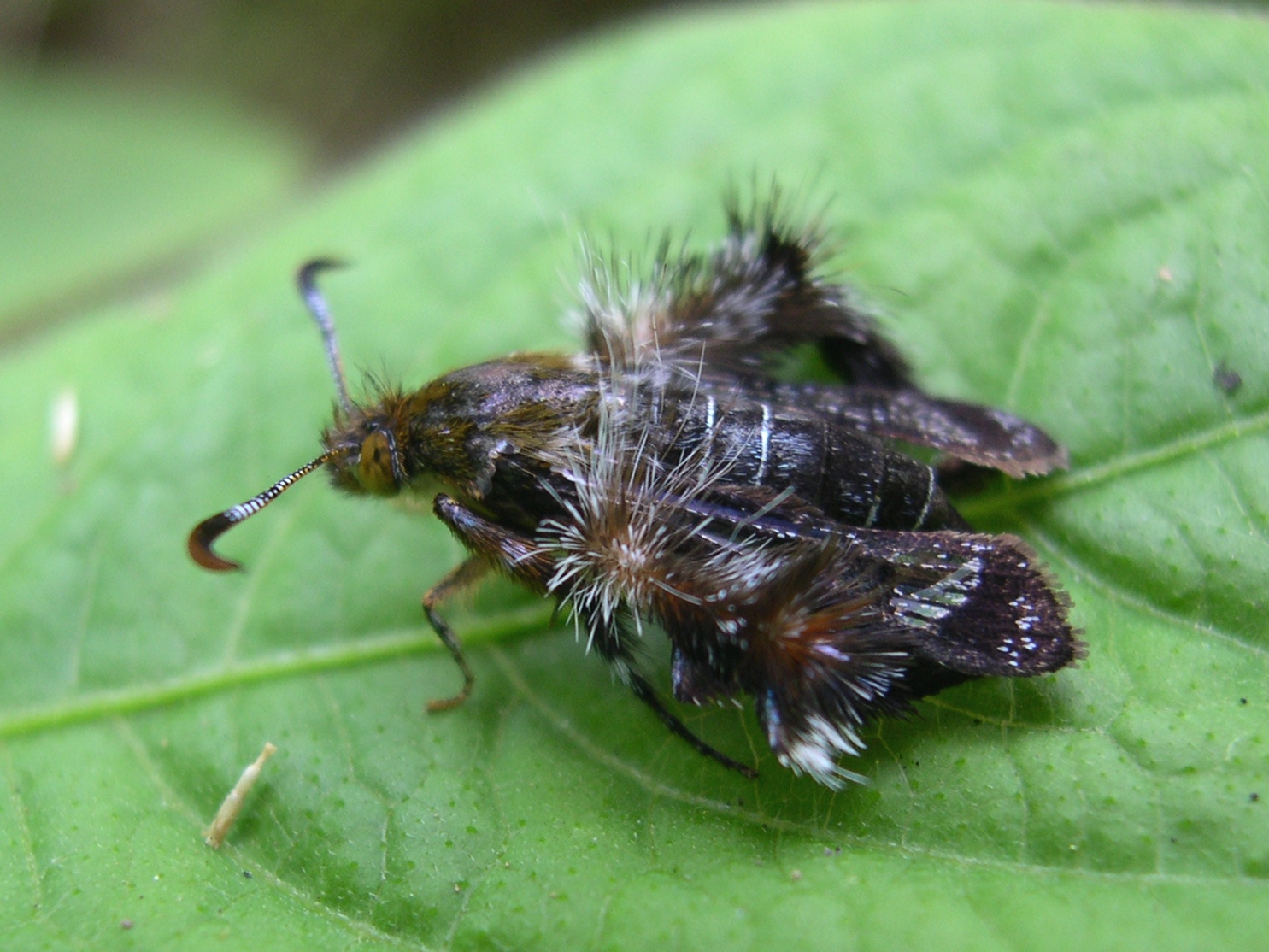
- Macroscelesia japona

Scientific classification
- Kingdom: Animalia
- Phylum: Arthropoda
- Class: Insecta
- Order: Lepidoptera
- Family: Sesiidae
- Tribe: Melittiini
- Genus: Macroscelesia; Hampson, 1919

Species
- See text

= Macroscelesia =

Genus of moths

Macroscelesia is a genus of moths in the family Sesiidae.

== Species ==
- Macroscelesia japona (Hampson, 1919)
- Macroscelesia longipes (Moore, 1877)
  - Macroscelesia longipes longipes (Moore, 1877)
  - Macroscelesia longipes yamatoensis Arita, 1992
- Macroscelesia aritai Kallies & Garrevoet, 2001
- Macroscelesia diaphana Gorbunov & Arita, 1995
- Macroscelesia elaea (Hampson, 1919)
- Macroscelesia formosana Arita & Gorbunov, 2002
- Macroscelesia owadai Arita & Gorbunov, 2000
- Macroscelesia sapaensis Kallies & Arita, 2004
- Macroscelesia vietnamica Arita & Gorbunov, 2000
