= Sphecosesia =

Scientific classification
- Kingdom: Animalia
- Phylum: Arthropoda
- Class: Insecta
- Order: Lepidoptera
- Family: Sesiidae
- Tribe: Sesiini
- Genus: Sphecosesia; Hampson, 1910

Species
- See text

Genus of moths

Sphecosesia is a genus of moths in the family Sesiidae.

== Species ==
- Sphecosesia ashinaga Kallies & Arita, 2004
- Sphecosesia aterea Hampson, 1919
- Sphecosesia bruneiensis Kallies, 2003
- Sphecosesia pedunculata Hampson, 1910
- Sphecosesia rhodites Kallies & Arita, 2004
