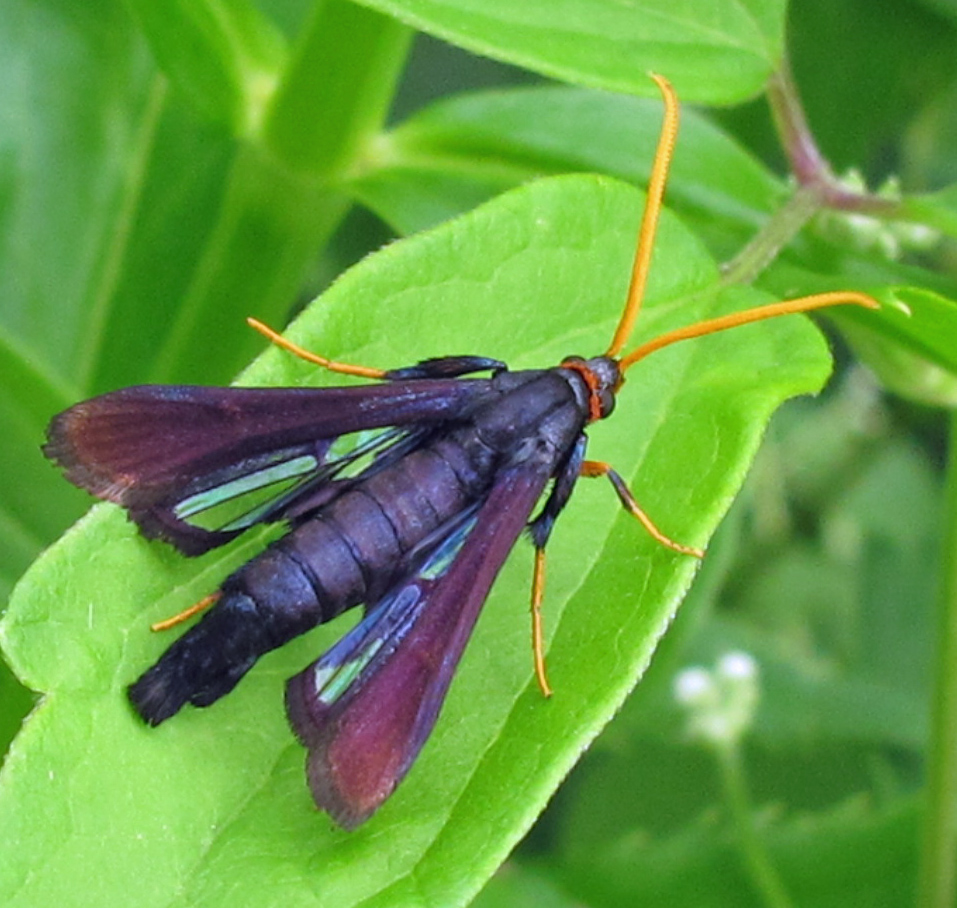
- Alcathoe caudata

Scientific classification
- Kingdom: Animalia
- Phylum: Arthropoda
- Clade: Pancrustacea
- Class: Insecta
- Order: Lepidoptera
- Family: Sesiidae
- Tribe: Synanthedonini
- Genus: Alcathoe; Edwards, 1882

= Alcathoe (moth) =

Genus of moths

Alcathoe is a genus of moths in the family Sesiidae.

== Species ==
- Alcathoe autumnalis Engelhardt, 1946
- Alcathoe carolinensis Engelhardt, 1925
- Alcathoe caudata (Harris, 1839)
- Alcathoe pepsioides Engelhardt, 1925
- Alcathoe verrugo (Druce, 1884)
- Alcathoe altera Zukowsky, 1936
- Alcathoe cuauhtemoci Krogmann & Riefenstahl, 2004
- Alcathoe helena (Druce, 1889)
- Alcathoe korites (Druce, 1884)
- Alcathoe leucopyga Bryk, 1953
- Alcathoe melini Bryk, 1953
