= Euryphrissa =

Scientific classification
- Domain: Eukaryota
- Kingdom: Animalia
- Phylum: Arthropoda
- Class: Insecta
- Order: Lepidoptera
- Family: Sesiidae
- Tribe: Synanthedonini
- Genus: Euryphrissa; Butler, 1874

Species
- See text

Genus of moths

Euryphrissa is a genus of moths in the family Sesiidae.

== Species ==
- Euryphrissa cambyses (Druce, 1884)
- Euryphrissa chea (Druce, 1899)
- Euryphrissa cladiiformis (Walker, 1856)
- Euryphrissa croesiformis (Walker, 1856)
- Euryphrissa fasciculipes (Walker, [1865])
- Euryphrissa homotropha (Meyrick, 1921)
- Euryphrissa infera (Meyrick, 1921)
- Euryphrissa plumipes (Walker, [1865])
- Euryphrissa pomponia (Le Cerf, 1911)
- Euryphrissa senta (Druce, 1883)
- Euryphrissa syngenica Zukowsky, 1936
- Euryphrissa remipes (Butler, 1874)
