= Grypopalpia =

Scientific classification
- Kingdom: Animalia
- Phylum: Arthropoda
- Class: Insecta
- Order: Lepidoptera
- Family: Sesiidae
- Tribe: Synanthedonini
- Genus: Grypopalpia; Hampson, 1919

Species
- See text

Genus of moths

Grypopalpia is a genus of moths in the family Sesiidae.

== Species ==
- Grypopalpia iridescens Hampson, 1919
- Grypopalpia uranopla (Meyrick, 1934)
