= Corematosetia =

Scientific classification
- Kingdom: Animalia
- Phylum: Arthropoda
- Clade: Pancrustacea
- Class: Insecta
- Order: Lepidoptera
- Family: Sesiidae
- Subfamily: Tinthiinae
- Genus: Corematosetia; Kallies & Arita, 2001

Species
- See text

Genus of moths

Corematosetia is a genus of moths in the family Sesiidae.

== Species ==
- Corematosetia minuta Kallies & Arita, 2006
- Corematosetia naumanni Kallies & Arita, 2001
