= Paranthrenopsis =

Scientific classification
- Kingdom: Animalia
- Phylum: Arthropoda
- Class: Insecta
- Order: Lepidoptera
- Family: Sesiidae
- Tribe: Tinthiini
- Genus: Paranthrenopsis; Le Cerf, 1911

Species
- See text

Genus of moths

Paranthrenopsis is a genus of moths in the family Sesiidae.

== Species ==
- Paranthrenopsis editha (Butler, 1878)
- Paranthrenopsis flavitaenia Wang & Yang, 2002
- Paranthrenopsis flaviventris Kallies & Arita, 2001
- Paranthrenopsis polishana (Strand, [1916])
- Paranthrenopsis siniaevi Gorbunov & Arita, 2000
- Paranthrenopsis taiwanella (Matsumura, 1931)
