= Lamellisphecia =

Scientific classification
- Kingdom: Animalia
- Phylum: Arthropoda
- Clade: Pancrustacea
- Class: Insecta
- Order: Lepidoptera
- Family: Sesiidae
- Tribe: Sesiini
- Genus: Lamellisphecia; Kallies & Arita, 2004

Species
- See text

Genus of moths

Lamellisphecia is a genus of moths in the family Sesiidae.

== Species ==
- Lamellisphecia champaensis Kallies & Arita, 2004
- Lamellisphecia haematinea Kallies & Arita, 2004
- Lamellisphecia sumatrana Fischer, 2005
- Lamellisphecia wiangensis Kallies & Arita, 2004
