= Glossosphecia =

Scientific classification
- Kingdom: Animalia
- Phylum: Arthropoda
- Class: Insecta
- Order: Lepidoptera
- Family: Sesiidae
- Tribe: Cisuvorini
- Genus: Glossosphecia; Hampson, 1919

Species
- See text

Genus of moths

Glossosphecia is a genus of moths in the family Sesiidae.

== Species ==
- Glossosphecia contaminata (Butler, 1878)
- Glossosphecia romanovi (Leech, 1889a)
- Glossosphecia huoshanensis (Xu, 1993)
- Glossosphecia melli (Zukowsky, 1929)
- Glossosphecia sherpa (Bartsch, 2003)
