= Melittosesia =

Scientific classification
- Domain: Eukaryota
- Kingdom: Animalia
- Phylum: Arthropoda
- Class: Insecta
- Order: Lepidoptera
- Family: Sesiidae
- Tribe: Sesiini
- Genus: Melittosesia; Bartsch, 2009
- Species: M. flavitarsa

Binomial name
- Melittosesia flavitarsa Daniel Bartsch, 2009

Genus of moths

Melittosesia is a genus of moths in the family Sesiidae from Madagascar.

This is a monotypic genus that only contains the species Melittosesia flavitarsa Bartsch, 2009 that was found in eastern Madagascar near Moramanga and Andasibe in mountainous primary forests. This species has a wingspan of 24–29 mm and a body length of 13–16 mm.
