= Cissuvora =

Scientific classification
- Domain: Eukaryota
- Kingdom: Animalia
- Phylum: Arthropoda
- Class: Insecta
- Order: Lepidoptera
- Family: Sesiidae
- Tribe: Cisuvorini
- Genus: Cissuvora; Engelhardt, 1946

Species
- See text

Genus of moths

Cissuvora is a genus of moths in the family Sesiidae.

== Species ==
- Cissuvora ampelopsis (Engelhardt, 1946)
- Cissuvora sinensis Wang & Yang, 2002
