= Trichocerota =

Scientific classification
- Domain: Eukaryota
- Kingdom: Animalia
- Phylum: Arthropoda
- Class: Insecta
- Order: Lepidoptera
- Family: Sesiidae
- Tribe: Tinthiini
- Genus: Trichocerota; Hampson, [1893]

Species
- 14 species (see text)

Genus of moths

Trichocerota is a genus of moths in the family Sesiidae. They occur in South and East Asia.

== Species ==
There are 14 recognized species:

- Trichocerota alectra (Arita & Gorbunov, 1995)
- Trichocerota antigama Meyrick, 1926
- Trichocerota diplotima Meyrick, 1926
- Trichocerota formosana Arita & Gorbunov, 2002
- Trichocerota fulvistriga Hampson, 1919
- Trichocerota intervenata Hampson, 1919
- Trichocerota melli Kallies & Arita, 2001
- Trichocerota proxima Le Cerf, 1916
- Trichocerota radians Hampson, 1919
- Trichocerota rubripectus (Xu & Liu, 1993)
- Trichocerota ruficincta Hampson, [1893]
- Trichocerota spilogastra (Le Cerf, 1916)
- Trichocerota tianpingensis (Xu & Liu, 1993)
- Trichocerota univitta Hampson, 1900
