= Rectala =

Scientific classification
- Kingdom: Animalia
- Phylum: Arthropoda
- Class: Insecta
- Order: Lepidoptera
- Family: Sesiidae
- Tribe: Tinthiini
- Genus: Rectala; Bryk, 1947

Species
- See text

Genus of moths

Rectala is a genus of moths in the family Sesiidae.

== Species ==
- Rectala asyliformis Bryk, 1947
- Rectala magnifica Kallies & Arita, 2001
