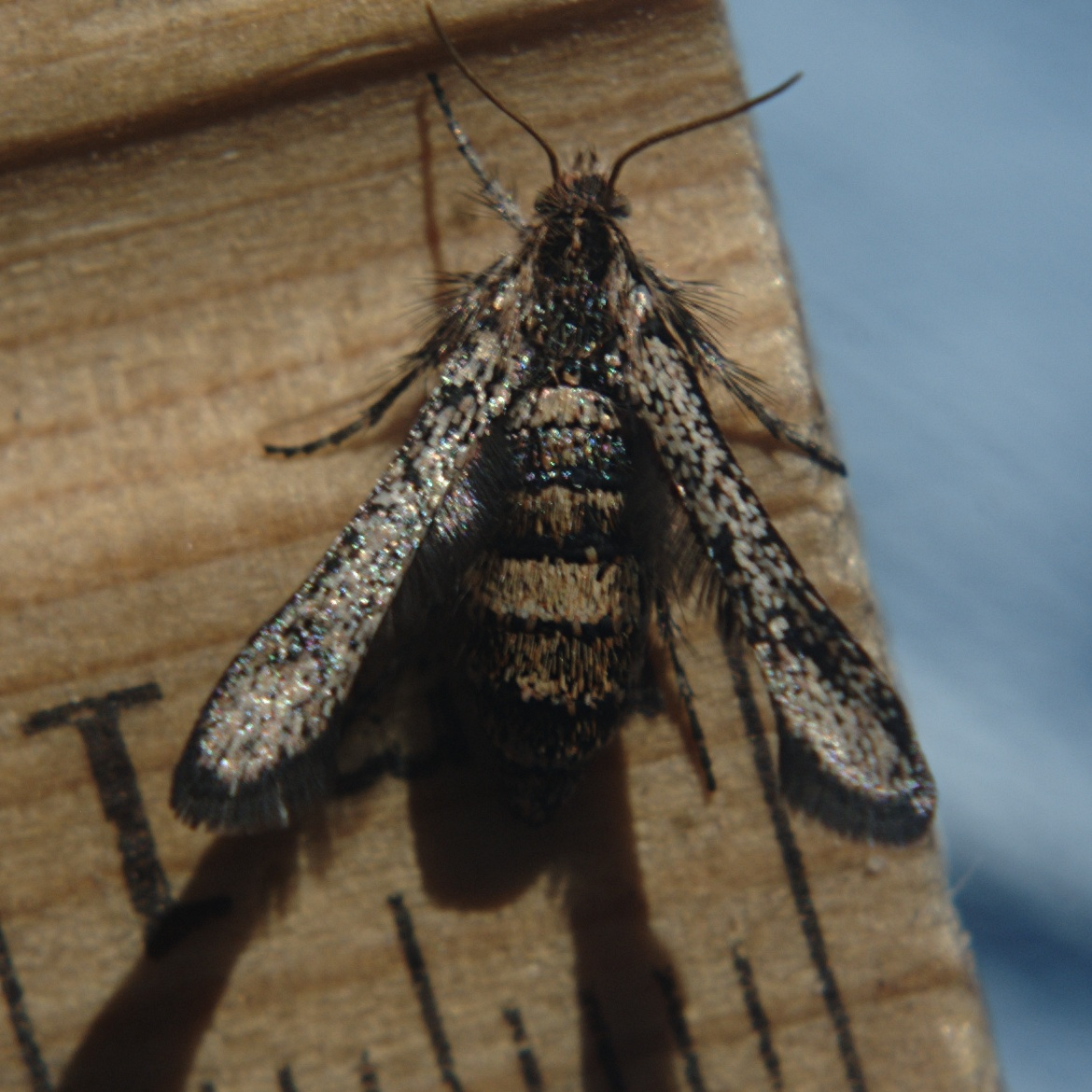
- Female Z. canescens

Scientific classification
- Domain: Eukaryota
- Kingdom: Animalia
- Phylum: Arthropoda
- Class: Insecta
- Order: Lepidoptera
- Family: Sesiidae
- Tribe: Tinthiini
- Genus: Zenodoxus; Grote & Robinson, 1868

Species
- See text

= Zenodoxus =

Genus of moths

Zenodoxus is a genus of moths in the family Sesiidae.

== Species ==
- Zenodoxus canescens Edwards, 1881
- Zenodoxus heucherae Edwards, 1881
- Zenodoxus maculipes Grote & Robinson, 1868
- Zenodoxus mexicanus Beutenmüller, 1897
- Zenodoxus palmii (Neumoegen, 1891)
- Zenodoxus rubens Engelhardt, 1946
- Zenodoxus sidalceae Engelhardt, 1946
