= Caudicornia =

Scientific classification
- Kingdom: Animalia
- Phylum: Arthropoda
- Class: Insecta
- Order: Lepidoptera
- Family: Sesiidae
- Tribe: Tinthiini
- Genus: Caudicornia; Bryk, 1947

Species
- See text

Genus of moths

Caudicornia is a genus of moths in the family Sesiidae.

== Species ==
- Caudicornia aurantia (Hampson, 1919)
- Caudicornia flavicincta (Hampson, 1919)
- Caudicornia flava (Xu & Liu, 1992)
- Caudicornia tonkinensis Kallies & Arita, 2001
- Caudicornia xanthopimpla Bryk, 1947
