= Tarsotinthia =

Scientific classification
- Kingdom: Animalia
- Phylum: Arthropoda
- Clade: Pancrustacea
- Class: Insecta
- Order: Lepidoptera
- Family: Sesiidae
- Tribe: Tinthiini
- Genus: Tarsotinthia; Arita & Gorbunov, 2003

Species
- See text

Genus of moths

Tarsotinthia is a genus of moths in the family Sesiidae.

== Species ==
- Tarsotinthia albogastra Arita & Gorbunov 2003
