= Entrichella =

Scientific classification
- Kingdom: Animalia
- Phylum: Arthropoda
- Class: Insecta
- Order: Lepidoptera
- Family: Sesiidae
- Tribe: Tinthiini
- Genus: Entrichella; Bryk, 1947

Species
- See text

Genus of moths

Entrichella is a genus of moths in the family Sesiidae.

== Species ==
- Entrichella constricta (Butler, 1878)
- Entrichella esakii (Yano, 1960)
- Entrichella pogonias Bryk, 1947
- Entrichella yakushimaensis (Arita, 1993)
- Entrichella erythranches (Meyrick, 1926)
- Entrichella fusca (Xu & Liu, 1992)
- Entrichella gorapani (Arita & Gorbunov, 1995)
- Entrichella hreblayi Petersen, 2001
- Entrichella issikii (Yano, 1960)
- Entrichella leiaeformis (Walker, 1856)
- Entrichella linozona (Meyrick, 1926)
- Entrichella meilinensis (Xu & Liu, 1993)
- Entrichella simifusca (Xu & Liu, 1993)
- Entrichella tricolor Kallies & Arita, 2001
- Entrichella trifasciata (Yano, 1960)
