= Paradoxecia =

Scientific classification
- Kingdom: Animalia
- Phylum: Arthropoda
- Class: Insecta
- Order: Lepidoptera
- Family: Sesiidae
- Tribe: Tinthiini
- Genus: Paradoxecia; Hampson, 1919

Species
- See text

Genus of moths

Paradoxecia is a genus of moths in the family Sesiidae.

== Species ==
- Paradoxecia gravis (Walker, 1865)
- Paradoxecia beibengensis Yu & Kallies, 2019
- Paradoxecia chura Arita, Kimura & Owada, 2009
- Paradoxecia dizona (Hampson, 1919)
- Paradoxecia fukiensis Gorbunov & Arita, 1997
- Paradoxecia karubei Kallies & Arita, 2001
- Paradoxecia kishidai Yu & Arita, 2019
- Paradoxecia luteocincta Kallies & Arita, 2001
- Paradoxecia myrmekomorpha (Bryk, 1947)
- Paradoxecia polyzona Yu & Kallies, 2019
- Paradoxecia radiata Kallies, 2002
- Paradoxecia similis Arita & Gorbunov, 2001
- Paradoxecia taiwana Arita & Gorbunov, 2001
- Paradoxecia tristis Kallies & Arita, 2001
- Paradoxecia tuzovi Gorbunov, 2021
- Paradoxecia vietnamica Gorbunov & Arita, 1997
