= Tyrictaca =

Scientific classification
- Kingdom: Animalia
- Phylum: Arthropoda
- Class: Insecta
- Order: Lepidoptera
- Family: Sesiidae
- Tribe: Tinthiini
- Genus: Tyrictaca; Walker, 1862

Species
- See text

Genus of moths

Tyrictaca is a genus of moths in the family Sesiidae.

== Species ==
- Tyrictaca apicalis Walker, 1862
