= Sophon (name) =

Sophon (Thai: โสภณ, pronounced [sǒː.pʰōn]) is a Thai masculine given name from Pali: sobhaṇa. People with the name include:

- Sophon Hayachanta, footballer
- Sophon Ratanakorn, judge
- Sophon Suphapong, business executive and senator
