= Sophona =

Scientific classification
- Kingdom: Animalia
- Phylum: Arthropoda
- Class: Insecta
- Order: Lepidoptera
- Family: Sesiidae
- Tribe: Tinthiini
- Genus: Sophona; Walker, 1856

Species
- See text

Genus of moths

Sophona is a genus of moths in the family Sesiidae.

== Species ==
- Sophona greenfieldi Eichlin, 1986
- Sophona albibasilaris Eichlin, 1986
- Sophona canzona Eichlin, 1986
- Sophona ceropaliformis (Walker, 1856)
- Sophona cyanomyia (Meyrick, 1930a)
- Sophona ezodda Eichlin, 1986
- Sophona flavizonata Zukowsky, 1937
- Sophona fusca Eichlin, 1986
- Sophona galba Eichlin, 1986
- Sophona gilvifasciata Eichlin, 1986
- Sophona halictipennis Walker, 1856
- Sophona hoffmanni Eichlin, 1986
- Sophona hondurasensis Eichlin, 1986
- Sophona lemoulti (Le Cerf, 1917)
- Sophona leucoteles (Clarke, 1962)
- Sophona ludtkei Eichlin, 1986
- Sophona manoba (Druce, 1889)
- Sophona panzona Eichlin, 1986
- Sophona pedipennula Kallies & Riefenstahl, 1999
- Sophona piperi Kallies & Riefenstahl, 1999
- Sophona snellingi Eichlin, 1986
- Sophona tabogana (Druce, 1883)
- Sophona xanthocera Eichlin, 1986
- Sophona xanthotarsis Eichlin, 1986
- Sophona yucatanensis Eichlin, 1986
- Sophona zukowskyi Eichlin, 1986
