= Oligophlebia =

Scientific classification
- Kingdom: Animalia
- Phylum: Arthropoda
- Class: Insecta
- Order: Lepidoptera
- Family: Sesiidae
- Subfamily: Tinthiinae
- Genus: Oligophlebia; Hampson, [1893]

Species
- See text

Genus of moths

Oligophlebia is a genus of moths in the family Sesiidae, the clearwing moths. They are native to the Palearctic realm.

As of 2014 there are eight species in the genus.

Species include:

- Oligophlebia amalleuta Meyrick, 1910
- Oligophlebia cristata Le Cerf, 1916b
- Oligophlebia episcopopa (Meyrick, 1926)
- Oligophlebia micra (Gorbunov, 1988)
- Oligophlebia minor Xu & Arita, 2014
- Oligophlebia nigralba Hampson, 1893
- Oligophlebia subapicalis Hampson, 1919
- Oligophlebia ulmi (Yang & Wang, 1989b)
