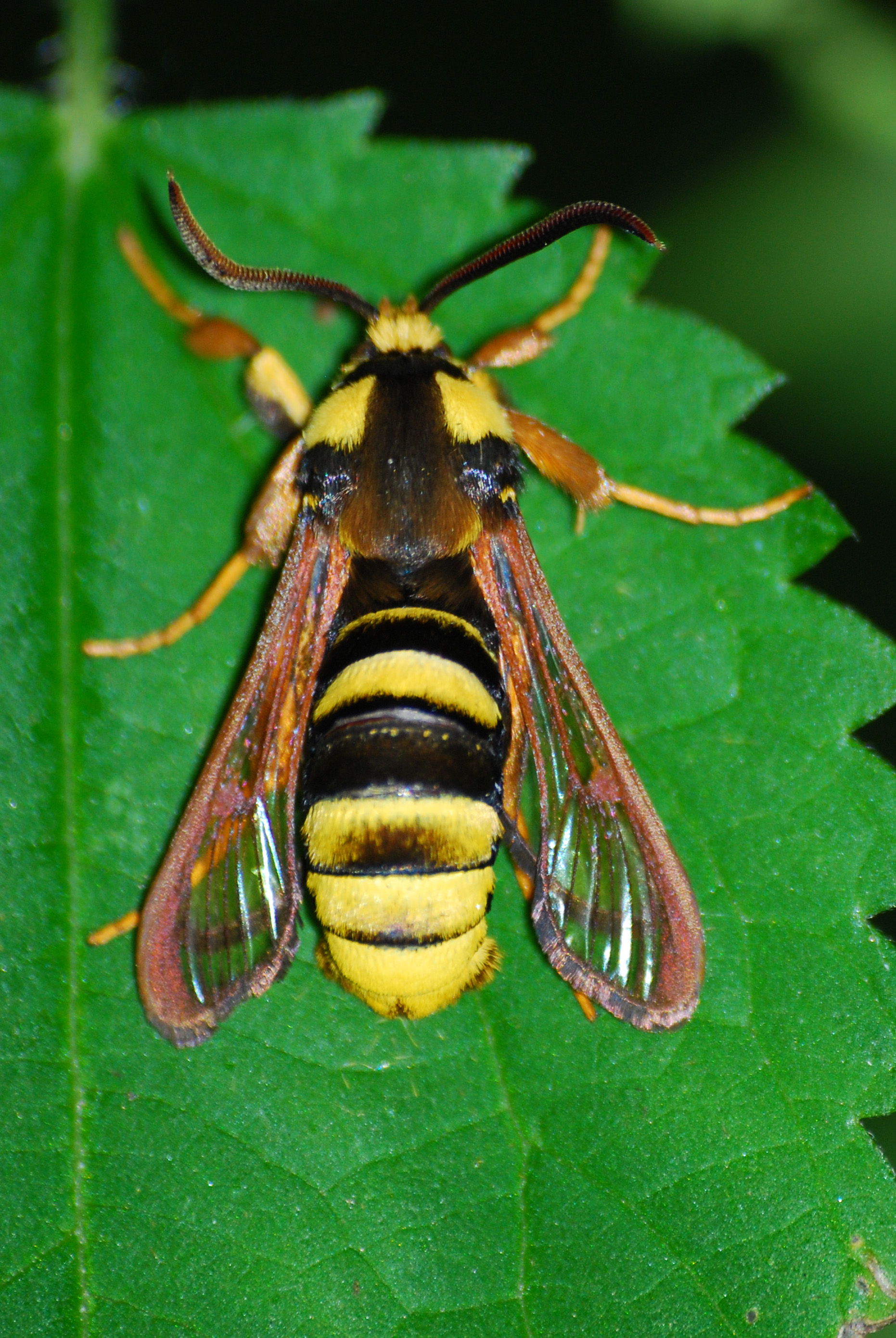
- Hornet clearwing

Scientific classification
- Domain: Eukaryota
- Kingdom: Animalia
- Phylum: Arthropoda
- Class: Insecta
- Order: Lepidoptera
- Family: Sesiidae
- Subfamily: Sesiinae; Boisduval, 1828

Type species
- Sphinx apiformis Clerck, 1759

= Sesiinae =

Subfamily of moths

The Sesiinae are a subfamily of clearwing moths, identified by Jean Baptiste Boisduval in 1828.
