= Ferdinand Le Cerf =

French entomologist (1881–1945)

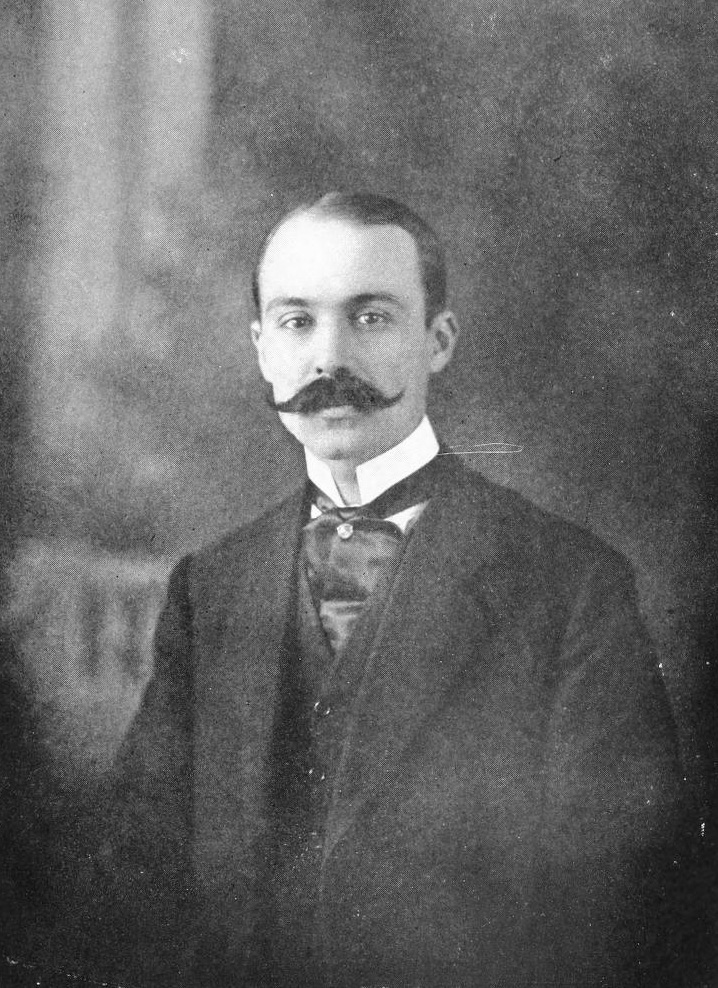
Ferdinand Le Cerf

Ferdinand Le Cerf (3 October 1881, Paris – 1945, Paris) was a French entomologist who specialised in Lepidoptera.

He was a préparateur or technician in the entomological laboratories of Muséum national d'histoire naturelle in Paris (where his collections are preserved). He wrote three volumes on Lepidoptera in the Encyclopedie Entomologique (Lechevalier Paris 1926, 1927 and 1929) and many scientific papers in the Bulletin of the Société entomologique de France of which he was a member. A room within the Paris Museum was until recently dedicated to him, but was disassembled in the 2010s.
