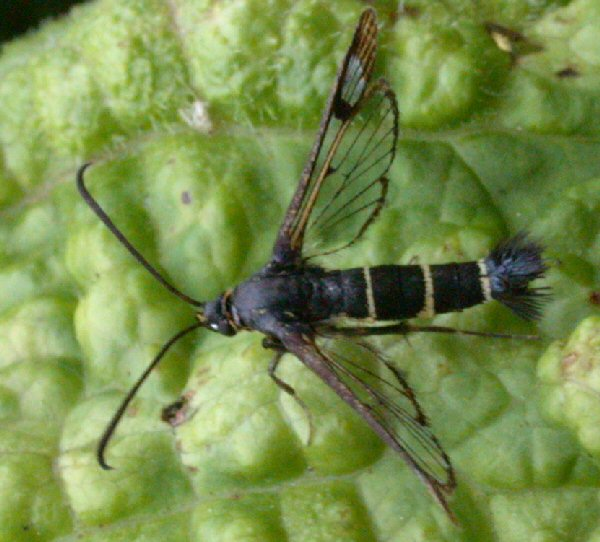
- Synanthedon tipuliformis

Scientific classification
- Kingdom: Animalia
- Phylum: Arthropoda
- Clade: Pancrustacea
- Class: Insecta
- Order: Lepidoptera
- Superfamily: Cossoidea
- Family: Sesiidae; Boisduval, 1828

Type species
- Sphinx apiformis Clerck, 1759

Subfamilies
- Sesiinae; Tinthiinae

Diversity
- 165 genera 1,525 species

Synonyms
- Aegeriidae Stephens, 1828; Trochiliidae Westwood, 1843

= Sesiidae =

Family of moths

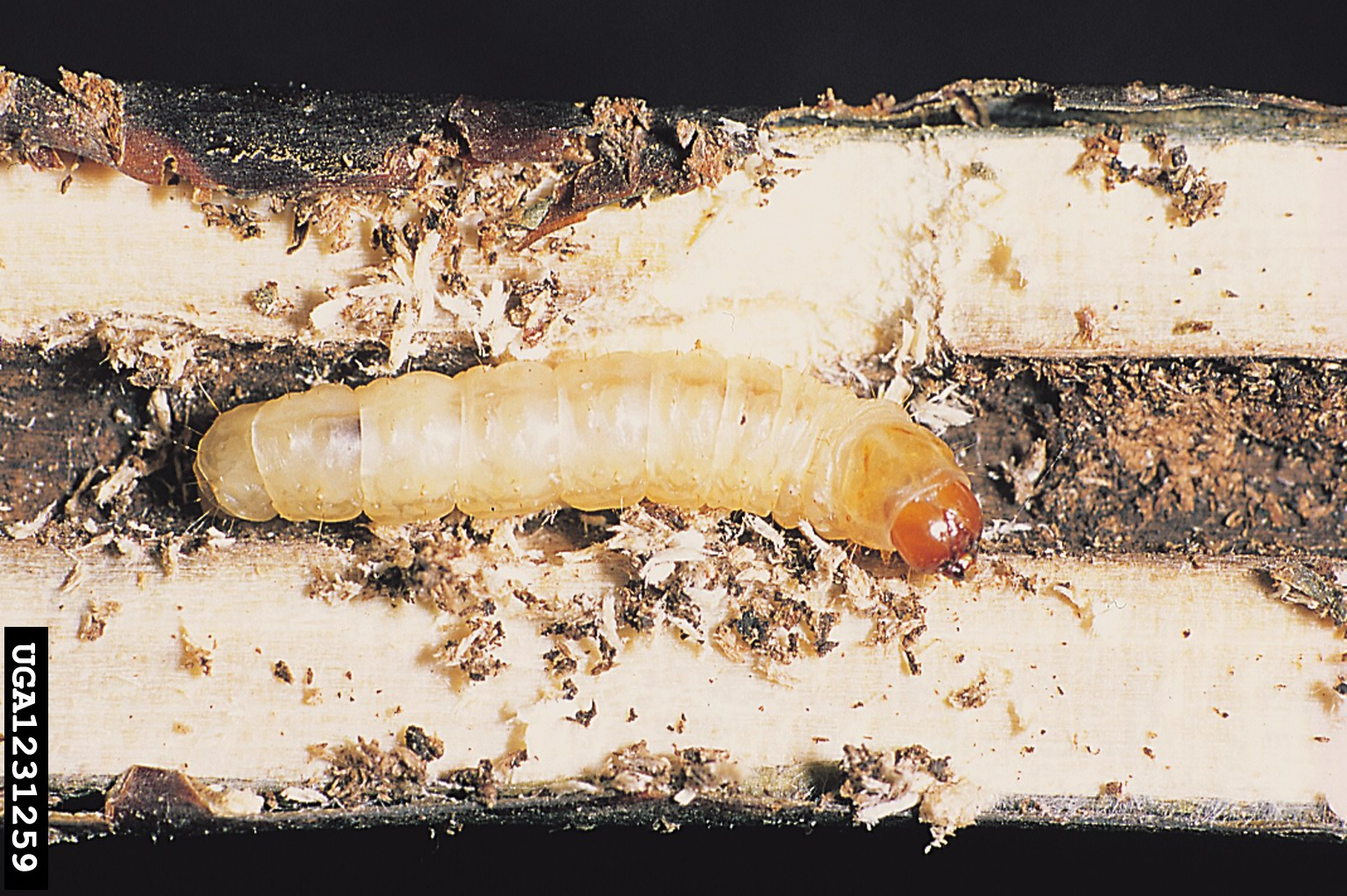
Synanthedon tipuliformis, larva

The Sesiidae or clearwing moths are a diurnal moth family in the order Lepidoptera known for their Batesian mimicry in both appearance and behaviour of various Hymenoptera.

The family consists of 165 genera spread over two subfamilies, containing in total 1525 species and 49 subspecies, most of which occur in the tropics, though there are many species in the Holarctic region as well, including over a hundred species known to occur in Europe.

== Morphology ==
Sesiidae are characterized by their hymenopteriform (Note: Hymenoptera + form: having the appearance of Hymenoptera species, such as wasps and hornets) Batesian mimicry, frequently of identifiable species. Most species of Sesiidae have wings with areas where scales are nearly completely absent, resulting in partial, marked transparency. Forewings are commonly elongated and narrow in the basal half. In many species, the abdomen is elongated, with an anal tuft, and striped or ringed yellow, red or white, sometimes very brightly so. Legs are long, thin and frequently coloured, and in some species the hind-legs are elongated. In European species, the wing span ranges from 8 to 48 mm.

Larvae lack pigment. Segments of the thorax are somewhat enlarged.

== Behaviour ==
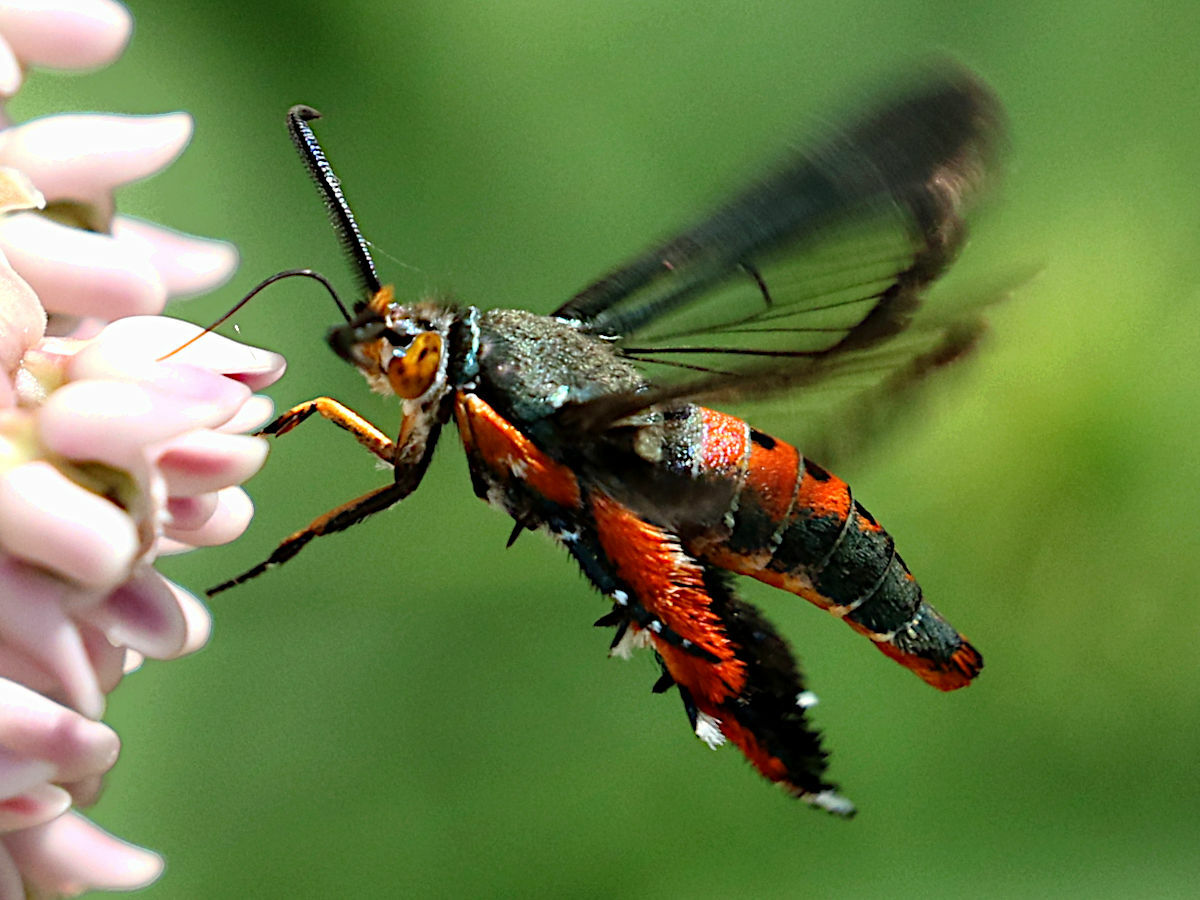
Melittia cucurbitae hovering for nectar

The larvae of the Sesiidae typically bore in wood or burrow in plant roots. Many species are serious pests of fruit-tree or timber cultivation, or crop plants (e.g. Melittia spp. on squash) (Edwards et al., 1999). Larval development lasts 1–4 years, pupal stage 10–20 days.

Adults are diurnally active. Specimens are commonly collected using pheromone lures.

Movements, including hovering flight, mimic those of Hymenoptera spp.

== Taxonomy ==
- Subfamily Tinthiinae Le Cerf, 1917
  - Tribe Tinthiini Le Cerf, 1917
    - Microsphecia Bartel, 1912
    - Tinthia Walker, [1865]
    - Sophona Walker, 1856
    - Zenodoxus Grote & Robinson, 1868
    - Conopsia Strand, [1913]
    - Paranthrenopsis Le Cerf, 1911
    - Entrichella Bryk, 1947
    - Negotinthia Gorbunov, 2001
    - Trichocerota Hampson, [1893]
    - Paradoxecia Hampson, 1919
    - Rectala Bryk, 1947
    - Ceratocorema Hampson, [1893]
    - Caudicornia Bryk, 1947
    - Bidentotinthia Arita & Gorbunov, 2003
    - Tarsotinthia Arita & Gorbunov, 2003
    - Tyrictaca Walker, 1862
  - Tribe Pennisetiini Naumann, 1971
    - Pennisetia Dehne, 1850
    - Corematosetia Kallies & Arita, 2001
  - Tribe Paraglosseciini Gorbunov & Eitschberger 1990
    - Oligophlebia Hampson, [1893]
    - Isothamnis Meyrick, 1935
    - Cyanophlebia Arita & Gorbunov, 2001
    - Lophocnema Turner, 1917
    - Diapyra Turner, 1917
    - Micrecia Hampson, 1919
  - Tribe Similipepsini Špatenka, Laštuvka, Gorbunov, Toševski & Arita, 1993
    - Similipepsis Le Cerf, 1911
    - Gasterostena Arita & Gorbunov, 2003
- Subfamily Sesiinae Boisduval, 1828
  - Tribe Sesiini Boisduval, 1828
    - Sesia Fabricius, 1775
    - Trilochana Moore, 1879
    - Cyanosesia Gorbunov & Arita, 1995
    - Sphecosesia Hampson, 1910
    - Teinotarsina Felder, 1874
    - Lenyra Walker, 1856
    - Aegerosphecia Le Cerf, 1916
    - Lamellisphecia Kallies & Arita, 2004
    - Clavigera Kallies & Arita, 2004
    - Eusphecia Le Cerf, 1937
    - Scasiba Matsumura, 1931
    - Callisphecia Le Cerf, 1916
    - Madasphecia Viette, 1982
    - Melittosesia Bartsch, 2009
    - Barbasphecia Pühringer & Sáfián 2011
    - Afrokona Fischer, 2006
    - Hovaesia Le Cerf, 1957
    - Lenyrhova Le Cerf, 1957
  - Tribe Cissuvorini Duckworth & Eichlin 1977
    - Toleria Walker, [1865]
    - Chimaerosphecia Strand, [1916]
    - Glossosphecia Hampson, 1919
    - Cissuvora Engelhardt, 1946
    - Dasysphecia Hampson, 1919
  - Tribe Osminiini Duckworth & Eichlin 1977
    - Osminia Le Cerf, 1917
    - Chamanthedon Le Cerf, 1916
    - Microsynanthedon Viette, [1955]
    - Calasesia Beutenmüller, 1899
    - Aenigmina Le Cerf, 1912
    - Cabomina de Freina, 2008
    - Pyranthrene Hampson, 1919
    - Homogyna Le Cerf, 1911
    - Aschistophleps Hampson [1893]
    - Pyrophleps Arita & Gorbunov, 2000
    - Heterosphecia Le Cerf, 1916
    - Melanosphecia Le Cerf, 1916
    - Akaisphecia Gorbunov & Arita, 1995
    - Callithia Le Cerf, 1916
  - Tribe Melittiini Le Cerf, 1917
    - Melittia Hübner, [1819]
    - Desmopoda Felder, 1874
    - Agriomelissa Meyrick, 1931
    - Afromelittia Gorbunov & Arita, 1997
    - Cephalomelittia Gorbunov & Arita, 1995
    - Macroscelesia Hampson, 1919
  - Tribe Paranthrenini Niculescu, 1964
    - Nokona Matsumura 1931
    - Taikona Arita & Gorbunov, 2001
    - Scoliokona Kallies & Arita, 1998
    - Rubukona Fischer, 2007
    - Adixoa Hampson, [1893]
    - Pramila Moore, 1879
    - Vitacea Engelhardt, 1946
    - Phlogothauma Butler, 1882
    - Paranthrene Hübner, [1819]
    - Pseudosesia Felder, 1861
    - Albuna Edwards, 1881
    - Euhagena Edwards, 1881
    - Sincara Walker, 1856
    - Tirista Walker, [1865]
    - Thyranthrene Hampson, 1919
    - Sura Walker, 1856
  - Tribe Synanthedonini Niculescu, 1964
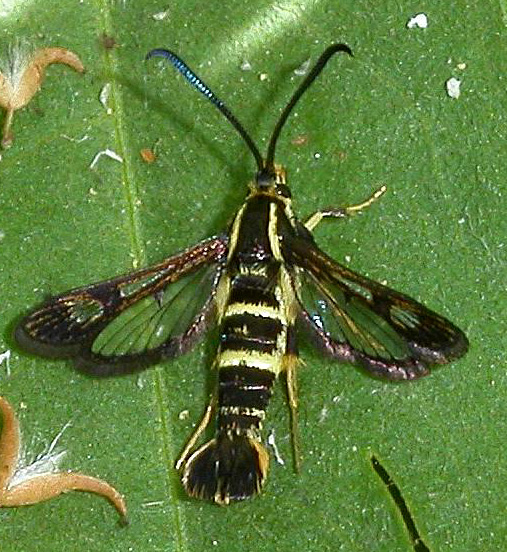
    Synanthedon sp.
    - Synanthedon Hübner, [1819]
    - Ravitria Gorbunov & Arita, 2000
    - Kantipuria Gorbunov & Arita, 1999
    - Kemneriella Bryk, 1947
    - Ichneumenoptera Hampson, [1893]
    - Paranthrenella Strand, [1916]
    - Anthedonella Gorbunov & Arita, 1999
    - Schimia Gorbunov & Arita, 1999
    - Uncothedon Gorbunov & Arita, 1999
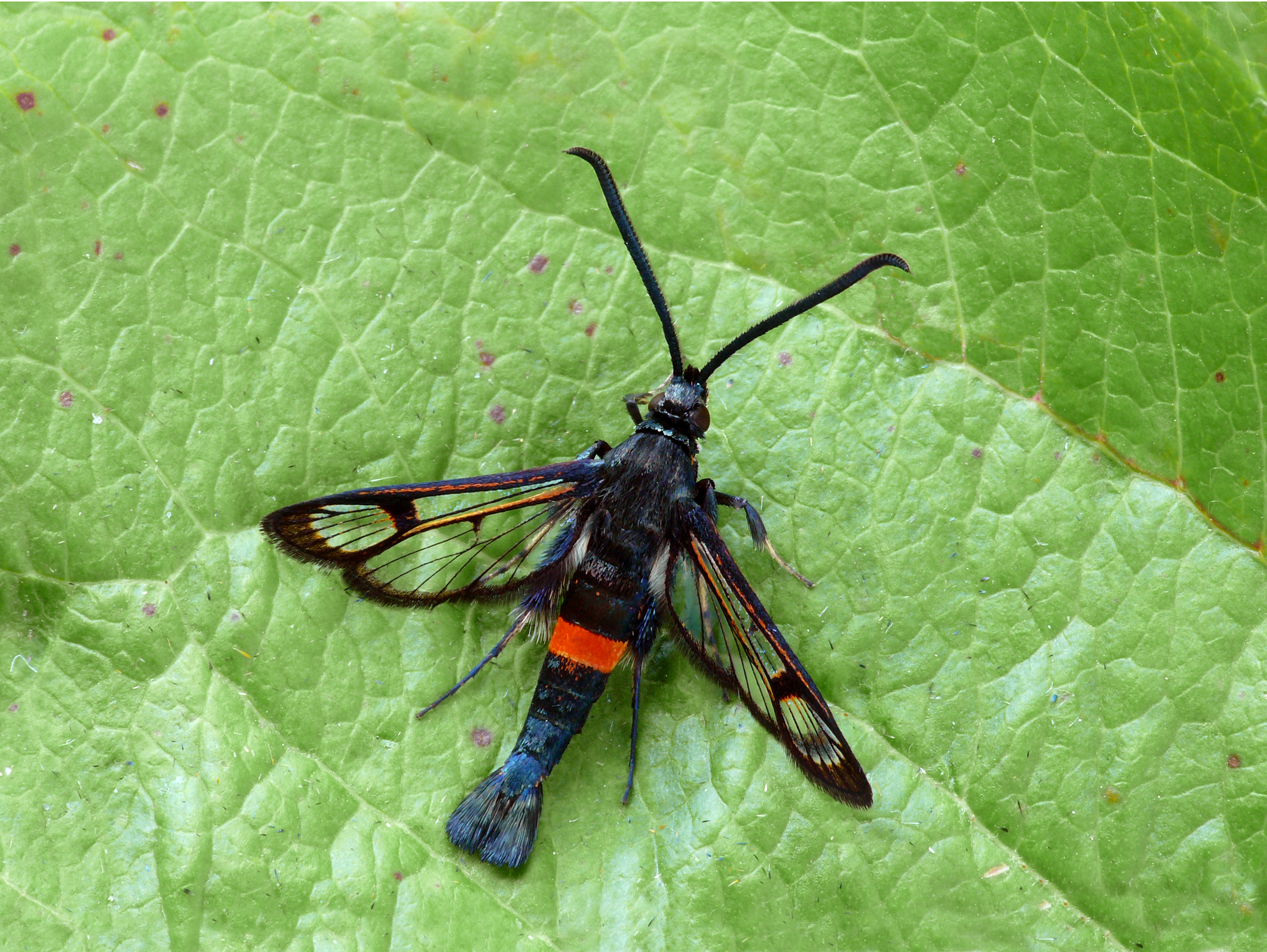
    - Synanthedon myopaeformis
      Palmia Beutenmüller, 1896
    - Podosesia Möschler, 1879
    - Sannina Walker, 1856
    - Nyctaegeria Le Cerf, 1914
    - Carmenta Edwards, 1881
    - Penstemonia Engelhardt, 1946
    - Camaegeria Strand, 1914
    - Malgassesia Le Cerf, 1922
    - Lophoceps Hampson, 1919
    - Tipulamima Holland, 1893
    - Rodolphia Le Cerf, 1911
    - Alcathoe Edwards, 1882
    - Pseudalcathoe Le Cerf, 1916
    - Macrotarsipus Hampson, [1893]
    - Grypopalpia Hampson, 1919
    - Hymenoclea Engelhardt, 1946
    - Euryphrissa Butler, 1874
    - Leptaegeria Le Cerf, 1916
    - Aegerina Le Cerf, 1917
    - Stenosphecia Le Cerf, 1917
    - Bembecia Hübner, [1819]
    - Pyropteron Newman, 1832
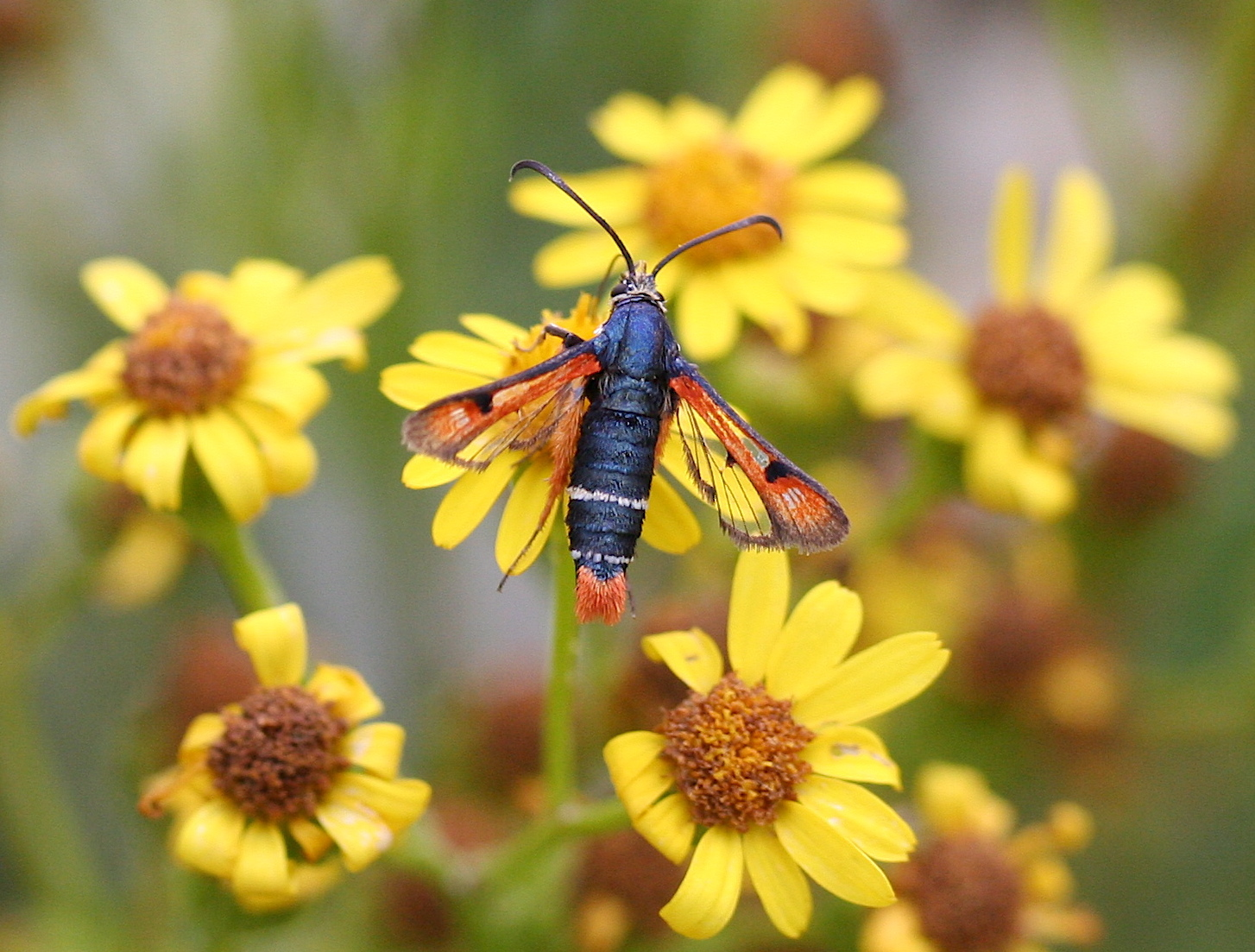
      The fiery clearwing moth, Pyropteron chrysidiformis
    - Dipchasphecia Capuse, 1973
    - Chamaesphecia Spuler, 1910
    - Weismanniola Naumann, 1971
    - Ichneumonella Gorbunov & Arita, 2005
    - Crinipus Hampson, 1896
  - Genera unassigned to tribe
    - Alonina Walker, 1856
    - Anaudia Wallengren, 1863
    - Augangela Meyrick, 1932
    - Austrosetia Felder, 1874
    - Ceritrypetes Bradley, 1956
    - Conopyga Felder, 1861
    - Echidgnathia Hampson, 1919
    - Episannina Aurivillius, 1905
    - Erismatica Meyrick, 1933
    - Gymnosophistis Meyrick, 1934
    - Hymenosphecia Le Cerf, 1917
    - Isocylindra Meyrick, 1930
    - Lepidopoda Hampson, 1900
    - Leuthneria Dalla Torre, 1925
    - Megalosphecia Le Cerf, 1916
    - Melisophista Meyrick, 1927
    - Metasphecia Le Cerf, 1917
    - Mimocrypta Naumann, 1971
    - Monopetalotaxis Wallengren, 1859
    - Pedalonina Gaede, 1929
    - Proaegeria Le Cerf, 1916
    - Pseudomelittia Le Cerf, 1917
    - Tradescanticola Hampson, 1919
    - Uranothyris Meyrick, 1933
    - Vespanthedon Le Cerf, 1917
    - Xenoses Durrant, 1924
    - Zhuosesia Yang, 1977
