= List of moths of Mozambique =

Location of Mozambique

The moths of Mozambique represent approximately 520 known species. Moths (mostly nocturnal) and butterflies (mostly diurnal) together make up the taxonomic order Lepidoptera.

This is a list of moth species which have been recorded in Mozambique.

== Adelidae ==
- Ceromitia aphroneura Meyrick, 1930
- Ceromitia crinigerella (Zeller, 1850)
- Ceromitia systelitis Meyrick, 1921
- Nemophora humilis (Walsingham, 1891)

== Alucitidae ==
- Alucita flaviserta (Meyrick, 1921)
- Alucita granata (Meyrick, 1921)
- Alucita myriodesma (Meyrick, 1929)

== Arctiidae ==
- Acanthofrontia dicycla Hampson, 1918
- Alpenus investigatorum (Karsch, 1898)
- Amata alicia (Butler, 1876)
- Amata bifasciata (Hopffer, 1857)
- Amata caerulescens (Druce, 1898)
- Amata francisca (Butler, 1876)
- Amerila affinis (Rothschild, 1910)
- Amerila lupia (Druce, 1887)
- Amerila magnifica (Rothschild, 1910)
- Amphicallia bellatrix (Dalman, 1823)
- Apisa grisescens (Dufrane, 1945)
- Argina amanda (Boisduval, 1847)
- Asura sagenaria (Wallengren, 1860)
- Caripodia consimilis Hampson, 1918
- Diota rostrata (Wallengren, 1860)
- Eilema bifasciata Hampson, 1900
- Eilema phaeopera Hampson, 1900
- Epitoxis nigra Hampson, 1903
- Estigmene linea (Walker, 1855)
- Euchromia amoena (Möschler, 1872)
- Euchromia folletii (Guérin-Méneville, 1832)
- Eyralpenus diplosticta (Hampson, 1900)
- Eyralpenus scioana (Oberthür, 1880)
- Lepista aposema Kühne, 2010
- Lepista pandula (Boisduval, 1847)
- Metarctia flavivena Hampson, 1901
- Metarctia rufescens Walker, 1855
- Micralarctia punctulatum (Wallengren, 1860)
- Nudaria quilimanensis Strand, 1922
- Nudaria quilimanicola Strand, 1922
- Nyctemera apicalis (Walker, 1854)
- Nyctemera leuconoe Hopffer, 1857
- Ochrota unicolor (Hopffer, 1857)
- Paralacydes arborifera (Butler, 1875)
- Paralacydes ramosa (Hampson, 1907)
- Paurophleps reducta (Janse, 1964)
- Phryganopsis cinerella (Wallengren, 1860)
- Pseudonaclia puella (Boisduval, 1847)
- Rhodogastria amasis (Cramer, 1779)
- Pusiola holoxantha (Hampson, 1918)
- Secusio mania Druce, 1887
- Secusio monteironis Rothschild, 1933
- Siccia quilimania Strand, 1922
- Spilosoma lineata Walker, 1855
- Thyretes caffra Wallengren, 1863
- Utetheisa pulchella (Linnaeus, 1758)

== Autostichidae ==
- Holcopogon scaeocentra Meyrick, 1921

== Batrachedridae ==
- Idioglossa triumphalis Meyrick, 1918

== Brachodidae ==
- Nigilgia mochlophanes (Meyrick, 1921)

== Choreutidae ==
- Brenthia pleiadopa Meyrick, 1921
- Choreutis dryodora (Meyrick, 1921)
- Choreutis irridens (Meyrick, 1921)
- Choreutis stereocrossa (Meyrick, 1921)

== Cosmopterigidae ==
- Alloclita zelotypa Meyrick, 1918
- Labdia macrobela Meyrick, 1918
- Limnaecia conjuncta Meyrick, 1921
- Macrobathra peraeota Meyrick, 1921
- Stilbosis cyclocosma (Meyrick, 1921)

== Cossidae ==
- Eulophonotus stephania (Druce, 1887)
- Phragmataecia innominata Dalla Torre, 1923
- Phragmataecia irrorata Hampson, 1910

== Crambidae ==
- Adelpherupa flavescens Hampson, 1919
- Agathodes musivalis Guenée, 1854
- Ancylolomia capensis Zeller, 1852
- Ancylolomia obscurella de Joannis, 1927
- Ancylolomia parentii Bassi, 2014
- Angustalius casandra Bassi,2014
- Angustalius malacellus (Duponchel, 1836)
- Bocchoris nuclealis de Joannis, 1927
- Calamoschoena stictalis Hampson, 1919
- Calamotropha dagamae Bassi, 2014
- Calamotropha mesostrigalis (Hampson, 1919)
- Calamotropha paludella (Hübner, 1824)
- Calamotropha toxophorus (de Joannis, 1927)
- Calamotropha virginiae Bassi, 2014
- Chilo diffusilinea (de Joannis, 1927)
- Chilo orichalcociliella (Strand, 1911)
- Chilo partellus (Swinhoe, 1885)
- Chilo sacchariphagus (Bojer, 1856)
- Chilo williami (de Joannis, 1927)
- Chrysocatharylla agraphellus (Hampson, 1919)
- Chrysocatharylla oenescentellus (Hampson, 1886)
- Classeya bicuspidalis (Hampson, 1919)
- Cotachena smaragdina (Butler, 1875)
- Crambus bellinii Bassi, 2014
- Culladia achroellum (Mabille, 1900)
- Dejoannisia pallidella (de Joannis, 1927)
- Epichilo obscurefasciellus (de Joannis, 1927)
- Euchromius klimeschi Błeszyński, 1961
- Euchromius mythus Błeszyński, 1970
- Euclasta varii Popescu-Gorj & Constantinescu, 1973
- Ischnurges lancinalis (Guenée, 1854)
- Nomophila noctuella ([Denis & Schiffermüller], 1775)
- Orphanostigma excisa (Martin, 1956)
- Parapoynx stagnalis (Zeller, 1852)
- Parotis invernalis (de Joannis, 1927)
- Pediasia ematheudellus (de Joannis, 1927)
- Pediasia nephelostictus (de Joannis, 1927)
- Prochoristis calamochroa (Hampson, 1919)
- Prochoristis lophopedalis (de Joannis, 1927)
- Scirpophaga marginepunctellus (de Joannis, 1927)
- Spoladea recurvalis (Fabricius, 1775)
- Surattha africalis Hampson, 1919

== Elachistidae ==
- Cryphioxena haplomorpha Meyrick, 1921
- Ethmia sabiella (Felder & Rogenhofer, 1875)
- Orophia hadromacha (Meyrick, 1937)
- Orophia languidula (Meyrick, 1921)
- Trachydora scandalotis Meyrick, 1921

== Eriocottidae ==
- Compsoctena rudis (Meyrick, 1921)

== Eupterotidae ==
- Hemijana variegata Rothschild, 1917
- Jana eurymas Herrich-Schäffer, 1854
- Jana roseata Rothschild, 1917
- Janomima mariana (White, 1843)
- Stenoglene hilaris Felder, 1874
- Stenoglene obtusus (Walker, 1864)
- Stenoglene roseus (Druce, 1886)
- Striphnopteryx edulis (Boisduval, 1847)

== Gelechiidae ==
- Anarsia agricola Walsingham, 1891
- Anarsia citromitra Meyrick, 1921
- Anarsia eriozona (Meyrick, 1921)
- Anarsia semnopa Meyrick, 1921
- Apotactis drimylota Meyrick, 1918
- Araeophylla spiladias (Meyrick, 1921)
- Asapharcha crateropa Meyrick, 1930
- Brachmia craticula Meyrick, 1921
- Brachyacma palpigera (Walsingham, 1891)
- Dicranucha legalis (Meyrick, 1921)
- Excommatica compsotoma (Meyrick, 1921)
- Gelechia lactiflora Meyrick, 1921
- Hedma microcasis (Meyrick, 1929)
- Iochares straminis (Walsingham, 1881)
- Neotelphusa melicentra (Meyrick, 1921)
- Parallactis plaesiodes (Meyrick, 1920)
- Pectinophora gossypiella (Saunders, 1844)
- Scrobipalpa sibila (Meyrick, 1921)
- Stomopteryx biangulata Meyrick, 1921
- Tricerophora commaculata (Meyrick, 1921)
- Trichotaphe monococca Meyrick, 1921

== Geometridae ==
- Acanthovalva bilineata (Warren, 1895)
- Acanthovalva inconspicuaria (Hübner, 1819)
- Biston exsilia Karisch, 2005
- Cartaletis libyssa (Hopffer, 1857)
- Chiasmia alternata (Warren, 1899)
- Chiasmia amarata (Guenée, 1858)
- Chiasmia ammodes (Prout, 1922)
- Chiasmia assimilis (Warren, 1899)
- Chiasmia boarmioides Krüger, 2001
- Chiasmia brongusaria (Walker, 1860)
- Chiasmia confuscata (Warren, 1899)
- Chiasmia curvifascia (Warren, 1897)
- Chiasmia deceptrix Krüger, 2001
- Chiasmia extrusilinea (Prout 1925)
- Chiasmia feraliata (Guenée, 1858)
- Chiasmia fuscataria (Möschler, 1887)
- Chiasmia grisescens (Prout, 1916)
- Chiasmia inconspicua (Warren, 1897)
- Chiasmia inquinata Krüger, 2001
- Chiasmia kilimanjarensis (Holland, 1892)
- Chiasmia majestica (Warren, 1901)
- Chiasmia marmorata Warren, 1897
- Chiasmia maronga Krüger, 2001
- Chiasmia nana (Warren, 1898)
- Chiasmia orientalis Krüger, 2001
- Chiasmia paucimacula Krüger, 2001
- Chiasmia rectistriaria (Herrich-Schäffer, 1854)
- Chiasmia rhabdophora (Holland, 1892)
- Chiasmia separata (Druce, 1882)
- Chiasmia simplicilinea (Warren, 1905)
- Chiasmia sororcula (Warren, 1897)
- Chiasmia streniata (Guenée, 1858)
- Chiasmia subcurvaria (Mabille, 1897)
- Chiasmia tecnium (Prout 1916)
- Chiasmia threnopsis (D. S. Fletcher, 1963)
- Chiasmia umbrata (Warren, 1897)
- Chiasmia umbratilis (Butler, 1875)
- Comibaena leucospilata (Walker, 1863)
- Diptychis meraca Prout, 1928
- Heterorachis devocata (Walker, 1861)
- Isturgia arizeloides Krüger, 2001
- Isturgia catalaunaria (Guenée, 1857)
- Isturgia deerraria (Walker, 1861)
- Isturgia exospilata (Walker, 1861)
- Isturgia spissata (Walker, 1862)
- Isturgia supergressa (Prout 1913)
- Metallochlora dyscheres Prout, 1922
- Mixocera albistrigata (Pagenstecher, 1893)
- Nassinia aurantiaca Prout, 1928
- Neromia rhodomadia Prout, 1922
- Nychiodes tyttha Prout, 1915
- Omizodes ocellata Warren, 1894
- Omizodes rubrifasciata (Butler, 1896)
- Paragathia albimarginata Warren, 1902
- Plateoplia acrobelia Wallengren 1875
- Platypepla spurcata Warren 1897
- Racotis apodosima Prout, 1931
- Racotis squalida (Butler, 1878)
- Rhodesia viridalbata Warren, 1905
- Rhodometra audeoudi Prout, 1928
- Rhodometra sacraria (Linnaeus, 1767)
- Traminda neptunaria (Guenée, 1858)
- Xanthisthisa tergorinota Prout, 1928
- Xenimpia erosa Warren, 1895
- Zamarada adiposata (Felder & Rogenhofer, 1875)
- Zamarada bathyscaphes Prout, 1912
- Zamarada crystallophana Mabille, 1900
- Zamarada deceptrix Warren, 1914
- Zamarada delosis D. S. Fletcher, 1974
- Zamarada dentigera Warren, 1909
- Zamarada differens Bastelberger, 1907
- Zamarada erugata D. S. Fletcher, 1974
- Zamarada euerces Prout, 1928
- Zamarada flavicaput Warren, 1901
- Zamarada glareosa Bastelberger, 1909
- Zamarada ignicosta Prout, 1912
- Zamarada ilma Prout, 1922
- Zamarada inermis D. S. Fletcher, 1974
- Zamarada metrioscaphes Prout, 1912
- Zamarada phaeozona Hampson, 1909
- Zamarada plana Bastelberger, 1909
- Zamarada psammites D. S. Fletcher, 1958
- Zamarada psectra D. S. Fletcher, 1974
- Zamarada pulverosa Warren, 1895
- Zamarada purimargo Prout, 1912
- Zamarada rufilinearia Swinhoe, 1904
- Zamarada scintillans Bastelberger, 1909
- Zamarada seydeli D. S. Fletcher, 1974
- Zamarada transvisaria (Guenée, 1858)
- Zamarada varii D. S. Fletcher, 1974
- Zamarada vulpina Warren, 1897

== Gracillariidae ==
- Aristaea bathracma (Meyrick, 1912)
- Epicephala haplodoxa Vári, 1961
- Pareclectis mimetis Vári, 1961
- Phyllocnistis citrella Stainton, 1856
- Stomphastis conflua (Meyrick, 1914)
- Stomphastis thraustica (Meyrick, 1908)

== Hepialidae ==
- Gorgopis libania (Stoll, 1781)

== Lacturidae ==
- Gymnogramma flavivitella (Walsingham, 1881)

== Lasiocampidae ==
- Anadiasa affinis Aurivillius, 1911
- Anadiasa schoenheiti (Wichgraf, 1922)
- Anadiasa swierstrai Aurivillius, 1922
- Braura truncatum (Walker, 1855)
- Cleopatrina phocea (Druce, 1887)
- Dinometa maputuana (Wichgraf, 1906)
- Eucraera gemmata (Distant, 1897)
- Eucraera koellikerii (Dewitz, 1881)
- Eucraera salammbo (Vuillot, 1892)
- Eutricha morosa (Walker, 1865)
- Gonometa postica Walker, 1855
- Gonometa robusta (Aurivillius, 1909)
- Grammodora nigrolineata (Aurivillius, 1895)
- Laeliopsis punctuligera Aurivillius, 1911
- Pallastica pallens (Bethune-Baker, 1908)
- Philotherma rosa (Druce, 1887)
- Sophyrita argibasis (Mabille, 1893)
- Stenophatna cymographa (Hampson, 1910)
- Stenophatna hollandi (Tams, 1929)
- Streblote polydora (Druce, 1887)
- Trichopisthia monteiroi (Druce, 1887)

== Lecithoceridae ==
- Odites cuculans Meyrick, 1918
- Odites incolumis Meyrick, 1918
- Odites sucinea Meyrick, 1915

== Limacodidae ==
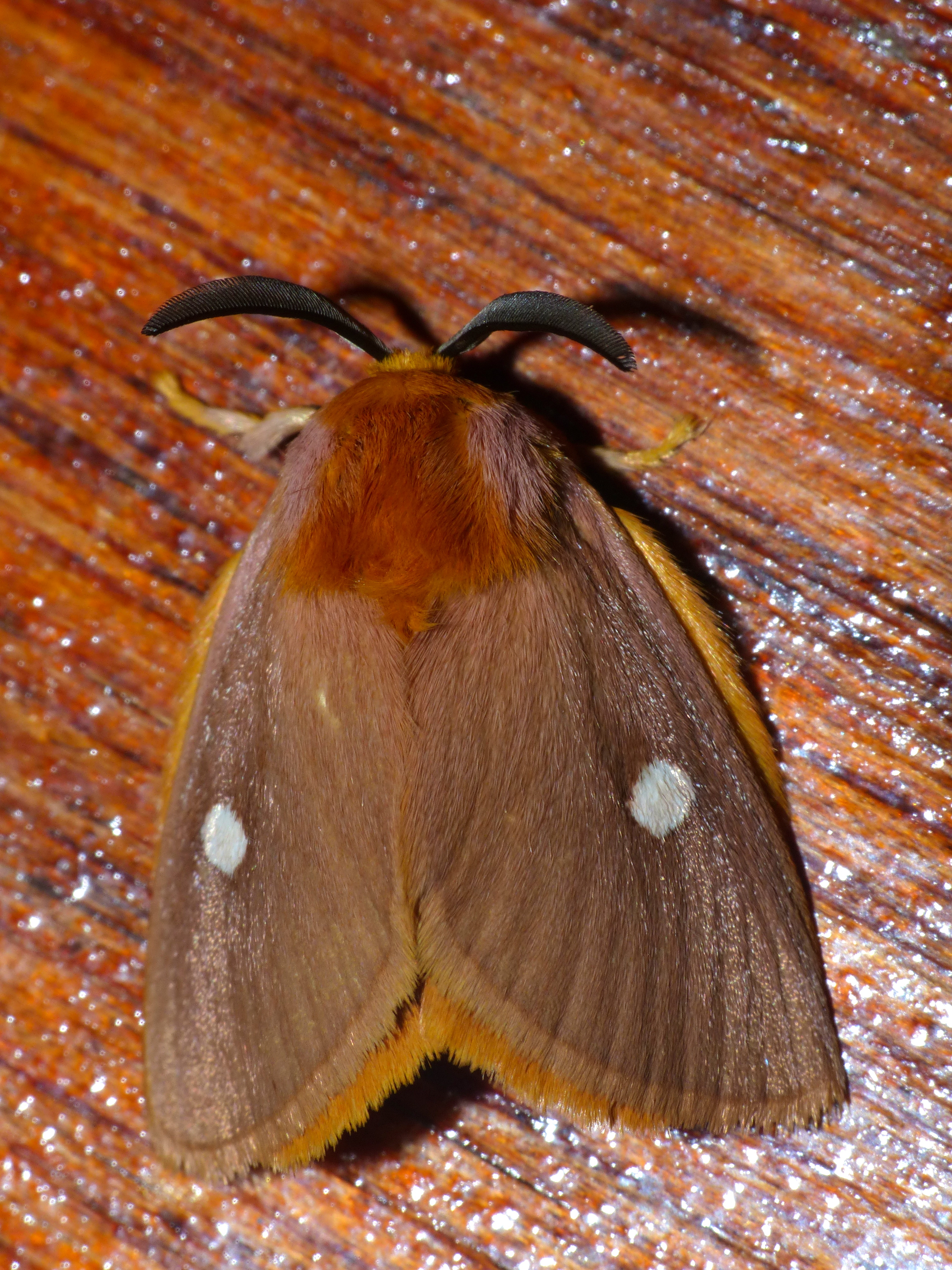
Chrysopoloma isabellina

- Chrysopoloma isabellina Aurivillius, 1895
- Chrysopoloma rosea Druce, 1886
- Crothaema sericea Butler, 1880
- Halseyia rectifascia (Hering, 1937)
- Latoia vivida (Walker, 1865)
- Latoia viridifascia Holland, 1893
- Micraphe lateritia Karsch, 1896
- Miresa habenichti Wichgraf, 1913
- Omocenoides isophanes Janse, 1964
- Scotinochroa inconsequens Butler, 1897
- Scotinochroa rufescens Janse, 1964
- Taeda gemmans (Felder, 1874)
- Thosea rufimacula Joicey & Talbot, 1921
- Trogocrada deleter Tams, 1953
- Zinara discophora Hampson, 1910
- Zinara nervosa Walker, 1869

== Lymantriidae ==
- Aclonophlebia rhodea Hampson, 1905
- Aroa discalis Walker, 1855
- Cimola opalina Walker, 1855
- Crorema fulvinotata (Butler, 1893)
- Dasychira cangia Druce, 1887
- Euproctis dewitzi (Grünberg, 1907)
- Euproctis pallida (Kirby, 1896)
- Euproctis punctifera (Walker, 1855)
- Griveaudyria cangia (Druce, 1887)
- Homochira poecilosticta Collenette, 1938
- Lacipa gracilis Hopffer, 1857
- Naroma varipes (Walker, 1865)
- Palasea albimacula Wallengren, 1863
- Pteredoa subapicalis Hering, 1926

== Lyonetiidae ==
- Cycloponympha hermione Meyrick, 1921

== Noctuidae ==
- Achaea echo (Walker, 1858)
- Achaea finita (Guenée, 1852)
- Achaea lienardi (Boisduval, 1833)
- Achaea mercatoria (Fabricius, 1775)
- Achaea praestans (Guenée, 1852)
- Acontia caffraria (Cramer, 1777)
- Acontia discoidea Hopffer, 1857
- Acontia guttifera Felder & Rogenhofer, 1874
- Acontia hampsoni Hacker, Legrain & Fibiger, 2008
- Acontia imitatrix Wallengren, 1856
- Acontia insocia (Walker, 1857)
- Acontia natalis (Guenée, 1852)
- Acontia niphogona (Hampson, 1909)
- Acontia psaliphora (Hampson, 1910)
- Acontia trimaculata Aurivillius, 1879
- Aegocera rectilinea Boisduval, 1836
- Amazonides tabida (Guenée, 1852)
- Anomis polymorpha Hampson, 1926
- Antiophlebia bracteata Felder, 1874
- Asota speciosa (Drury, 1773)
- Athetis satellitia (Hampson, 1902)
- Attatha ethiopica Hampson, 1910
- Brephos decora (Linnaeus, 1764)
- Brevipecten cornuta Hampson, 1902
- Brevipecten wolframmeyi Hacker & Fibiger, 2007
- Busseola fusca (Fuller, 1901)
- Calliodes pretiosissima Holland, 1892
- Cerocala vermiculosa Herrich-Schäffer, [1858]
- Chrysodeixis chalcites (Esper, 1789)
- Cometaster pyrula (Hopffer, 1857)
- Compsotata elegantissima (Guenée, 1852)
- Cuneisigna obstans (Walker, 1858)
- Cyligramma latona (Cramer, 1775)
- Cyligramma limacina (Guérin-Méneville, 1832)
- Deinopa flavida Hampson, 1926
- Diaphone eumela (Stoll, 1781)
- Diaphone mossambicensis Hopffer, 1862
- Diparopsis castanea Hampson, 1902
- Dysgonia algira Linnaeus, 1767
- Dysgonia albilinea (Hampson, 1918)
- Dysgonia torrida (Guenée, 1852)
- Egybolis vaillantina (Stoll, 1790)
- Entomogramma pardus Guenée, 1852
- Episparis leucotessellis Hampson, 1902
- Erebus macrops (Linnaeus, 1767)
- Erebus walkeri (Butler, 1875)
- Ethiopica cupricolor (Hampson, 1902)
- Eublemma anachoresis (Wallengren, 1863)
- Eulocastra poliogramma Hampson, 1918
- Eutelia callichroma (Distant, 1901)
- Eutelia vulgaris Mabille, 1900
- Feliniopsis africana (Schaus & Clements, 1893)
- Gesonia stictigramma Hampson, 1926
- Grammodes exclusiva Pagenstecher, 1907
- Grammodes stolida (Fabricius, 1775)
- Helicoverpa armigera (Hübner, 1808)
- Heliophisma xanthoptera (Hampson, 1910)
- Heraclia mozambica (Mabille, 1890)
- Heraclia pentelia (Druce, 1887)
- Heraclia perdix (Druce, 1887)
- Heraclia superba (Butler, 1875)
- Hespagarista echione (Boisduval, 1847)
- Hydrillodes uliginosalis Guenée, 1854
- Hypopyra capensis Herrich-Schäffer, 1854
- Leucovis alba (Rothschild, 1897)
- Marcipa mediana Hampson, 1926
- Marcipa phaeodonta Hampson, 1926
- Maxera brachypecten Hampson, 1926
- Mecodina rufipalpis Hampson, 1926
- Mentaxya ignicollis (Walker, 1857)
- Mesogenea costimacula Hampson, 1926
- Miniodes discolor Guenée, 1852
- Mocis mayeri (Boisduval, 1833)
- Mocis mutuaria (Walker, 1858)
- Mocis undata (Fabricius, 1775)
- Mythimna umbrigera (Saalmüller, 1891)
- Oedebasis ovipennis Hampson, 1902
- Ophiusa hypoxantha (Hampson, 1918)
- Ophiusa legendrei Viette, 1967
- Ophiusa tettensis (Hopffer, 1857)
- Ozarba cryptochrysea (Hampson, 1902)
- Ozarba fasciata (Wallengren, 1860)
- Pangrapta melacleptra Hampson, 1926
- Paralephana argyresthia Hampson, 1926
- Plecopterodes moderata (Wallengren, 1860)
- Proschaliphora albida Hampson, 1909
- Pseudogyrtona nigrivitta Hampson, 1926
- Sergiusia pentelia (Druce, 1887)
- Sesamia calamistis Hampson, 1910
- Sphingomorpha chlorea (Cramer, 1777)
- Sommeria culta Hübner, 1831
- Syngatha semipurpurea Hampson, 1918
- Tavia latebra Hampson, 1926
- Tephrialia vausema Hampson, 1926
- Trigonodes hyppasia (Cramer, 1779)
- Tycomarptes inferior (Guenée, 1852)
- Zekelita angularis (Mabille, 1880)

== Nolidae ==
- Acaenica diaperas Hampson, 1918
- Blenina quadripuncta Hampson, 1902
- Bryothripa miophaea Hampson, 1912
- Chlorozada metaleuca (Hampson, 1905)
- Earias biplaga Walker, 1866
- Earias insulana (Boisduval, 1833)
- Megathripa rufimedia (Hampson, 1905)
- Nola quilimanensis Strand, 1920
- Nola socotrensis (Hampson, 1901)
- Nola taeniata Snellen, 1874
- Odontestis fuscicona (Hampson, 1910)
- Paranola bipartita van Son, 1933
- Paranola nigristriga van Son, 1933

== Notodontidae ==
- Amyops ingens Karsch, 1895
- Antheua simplex Walker, 1855
- Atrasana nigrosignata Kiriakoff, 1975
- Bisolita rubrifascia (Hampson, 1910)
- Deinarchia agramma (Hampson, 1910)
- Desmeocraera moza Kiriakoff, 1962
- Eurystauridia iphis Kiriakoff, 1968
- Fentonina exacta Kiriakoff, 1962
- Odontoperas heterogyna (Hampson, 1910)
- Phalera atrata (Grünberg, 1907)
- Pinheyia lymantrioides Kiriakoff, 1971
- Psalisodes dimorpha Kiriakoff, 1968
- Scrancia pinheyi Kiriakoff, 1965
- Ulinodes costalis Kiriakoff, 1968

== Oecophoridae ==
- Isocrita phlyctidopa Meyrick, 1921
- Lasiomactra acharista Meyrick, 1921
- Oedematopoda princeps (Zeller, 1852)
- Orygocera recordata Meyrick, 1921
- Porthmologa deltophanes Meyrick, 1918
- Stathmopoda aegotricha Meyrick, 1921
- Stathmopoda teleozona Meyrick, 1921

== Psychidae ==
- Acanthopsyche emiliae (Heylaerts, 1890)
- Albidopsis major (Heylaerts, 1890)
- Barbaroscardia fasciata Walsingham, 1891
- Diaphanopsyche rogenhoferi (Heylaerts, 1890)
- Eumeta cervina Druce, 1887
- Eumeta hardenbergeri Bourgogne, 1955
- Gymnelema rougemontii Heylaerts, 1891
- Melasina hippias Meyrick, 1921
- Psyche trimeni Heylaerts, 1891
- Typhonia linodyta (Meyrick, 1921)

== Pterophoridae ==
- Adaina propria Meyrick, 1921
- Pselnophorus pachyceros Meyrick, 1921
- Pterophorus albidus (Zeller, 1852)

== Pyralidae ==
- Aglossa suppunctalis de Joannis, 1927
- Ancylosis platynephes de Joannis, 1927
- Anobostra punctilimbalis (Ragonot, 1891)
- Audeoudia grisella de Joannis, 1927
- Bostra fumosa de Joannis, 1927
- Eldana saccharina Walker, 1865
- Emmalocera unitella de Joannis, 1927
- Epicrocis nigrilinea (de Joannis, 1927)
- Epicrocis striaticosta (de Joannis, 1927)
- Epicrocis vicinella (de Joannis, 1927)
- Epilepia melapastalis (Hampson, 1906)
- Episindris albimaculalis Ragonot, 1891
- Eucarphia hemityrella (de Joannis, 1927)
- Eulophota bipars de Joannis, 1927
- Eulophota floridella de Joannis, 1927
- Eulophota pretoriella de Joannis, 1927
- Eulophota simplex de Joannis, 1927
- Euzophera hemileuca de Joannis, 1927
- Euzophera specula de Joannis, 1927
- Faveria albilinea (de Joannis, 1927)
- Herculia cineralis de Joannis, 1927
- Hypargyria impecuniosa de Joannis, 1927
- Hypsotropa makulanella de Joannis, 1927
- Joannisia hypolepias (de Joannis, 1927)
- Laetilia hebraica de Joannis, 1927
- Laodamia polygraphella de Joannis, 1927
- Nephopterix cometella de Joannis, 1927
- Oncocera bibasella (de Joannis, 1927)
- Oncocera floridana (de Joannis, 1927)
- Oncocera leucosticta (de Joannis, 1927)
- Orthaga umbrimargo de Joannis, 1927
- Ortholepis cretaciella de Joannis, 1927
- Paralaodamia scalaris (de Joannis, 1927)
- Pempelia apicella (de Joannis, 1927)
- Pempelia morosalis (Saalmüller, 1880)
- Phycita venalbella (de Joannis, 1927)
- Pima difficilis de Joannis, 1927
- Pima flavidorsella de Joannis, 1927
- Pretoria audeoudi de Joannis, 1927
- Prophtasia rosa de Joannis, 1927
- Rhinaphe scripta de Joannis, 1927
- Saluria nimbelloides de Joannis, 1927
- Spatulipalpia monstrosa Balinsky, 1994
- Stemmatophora bicincta de Joannis, 1927
- Tegulifera audeoudi de Joannis, 1927
- Trachylepidia fructicassiella Ragonot, 1887

== Saturniidae ==
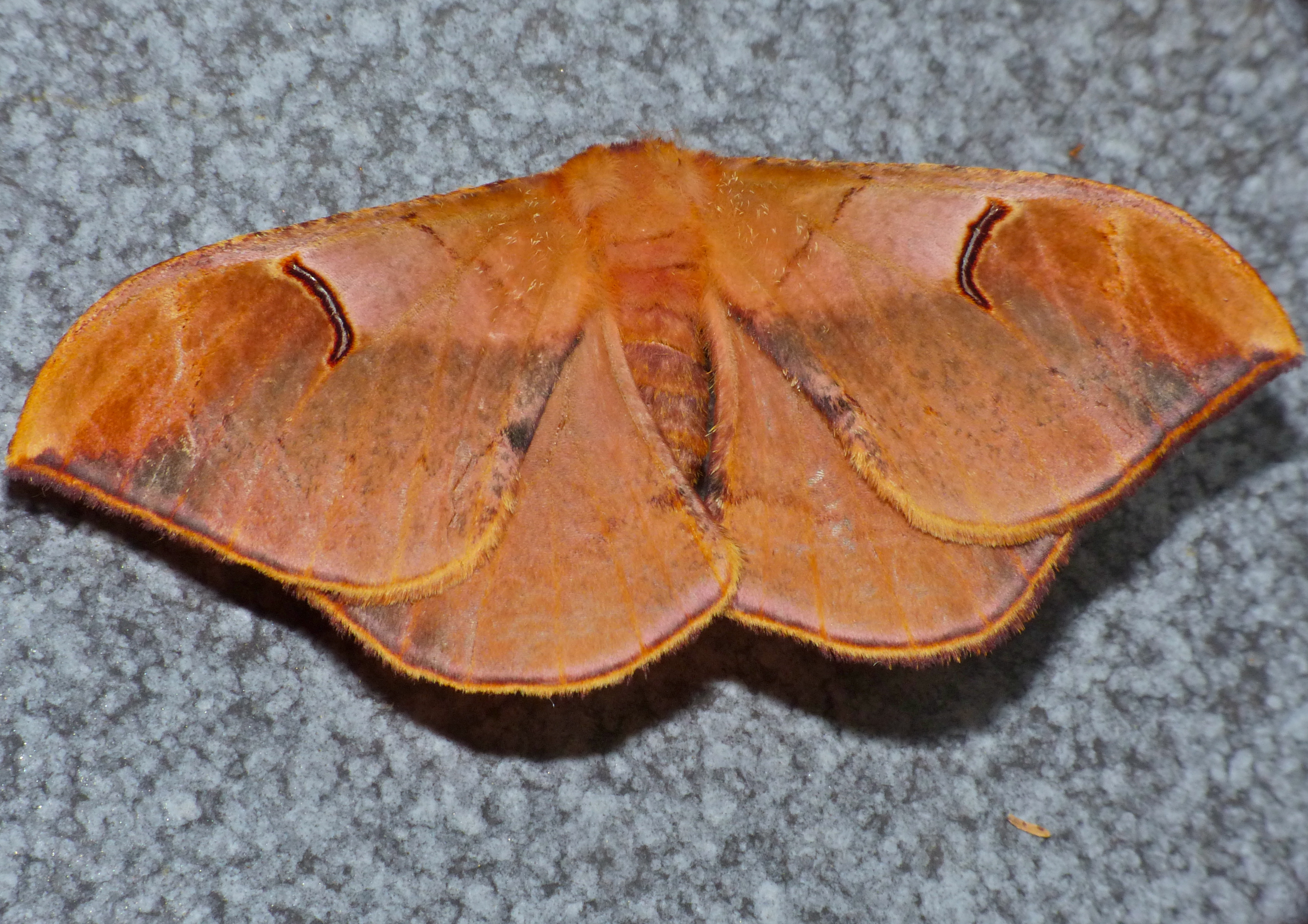
Campimoptilum kuntzei

- Adafroptilum austriorientale Darge, 2008
- Adafroptilum incana (Sonthonnax, 1899)
- Antistathmoptera daltonae Tams, 1935
- Antistathmoptera rectangulata Pinhey, 1968
- Argema mimosae (Boisduval, 1847)
- Aurivillius arata (Westwood, 1849)
- Bunaea alcinoe (Stoll, 1780)
- Bunaeopsis hersilia (Westwood, 1849)
- Bunaeopsis oubie (Guérin-Méneville, 1849)
- Campimoptilum kuntzei (Dewitz, 1881)
- Cinabra hyperbius (Westwood, 1881)
- Cirina forda (Westwood, 1849)
- Epiphora mythimnia (Westwood, 1849)
- Gonimbrasia affinis (Bouvier, 1926)
- Gonimbrasia belina (Westwood, 1849)
- Gonimbrasia wahlbergii (Boisduval, 1847)
- Gonimbrasia zambesina (Walker, 1865)
- Gynanisa maja (Klug, 1836)
- Holocerina angulata (Aurivillius, 1893)
- Holocerina smilax (Westwood, 1849)
- Imbrasia ertli Rebel, 1904
- Lobobunaea angasana (Westwood, 1849)
- Ludia delegorguei (Boisduval, 1847)
- Ludia goniata Rothschild, 1907
- Melanocera menippe (Westwood, 1849)
- Micragone cana (Aurivillius, 1893)
- Micragone nubifera Bouvier, 1936
- Pselaphelia flavivitta (Walker, 1862)
- Pseudaphelia apollinaris (Boisduval, 1847)
- Pseudimbrasia deyrollei (J. Thomson, 1858)
- Pseudobunaea irius (Fabricius, 1793)
- Pseudobunaea tyrrhena (Westwood, 1849)
- Usta terpsichore (Maassen & Weymer, 1885)

== Sesiidae ==
- Chamanthedon amorpha Hampson, 1919
- Chamanthedon critheis (Druce, 1899)
- Chamanthedon elymais (Druce, 1899)
- Chamanthedon tiresa (Druce, 1899)
- Episannina melanochalcia Le Cerf, 1917
- Melittia boulleti Le Cerf, 1917
- Melittia endoxantha Hampson, 1919
- Melittia natalensis Butler, 1874
- Paranthrene cuprescens Hampson, 1919
- Sura pyrocera Hampson, 1919
- Synanthedon vassei (Le Cerf, 1917)
- Tipulamima sophax (Druce, 1899)
- Vespanthedon cerceris Le Cerf, 1917

== Sphingidae ==
- Acherontia atropos (Linnaeus, 1758)
- Agrius convolvuli (Linnaeus, 1758)
- Afroclanis calcareus (Rothschild & Jordan, 1907)
- Basiothia medea (Fabricius, 1781)
- Centroctena imitans (Butler, 1882)
- Coelonia fulvinotata (Butler, 1875)
- Euchloron megaera (Linnaeus, 1758)
- Falcatula falcata (Rothschild & Jordan, 1903)
- Hippotion balsaminae (Walker, 1856)
- Hippotion celerio (Linnaeus, 1758)
- Hippotion osiris (Dalman, 1823)
- Hippotion rosae (Butler, 1882)
- Hippotion roseipennis (Butler, 1882)
- Likoma crenata Rothschild & Jordan, 1907
- Macroglossum trochilus (Hübner, 1823)
- Nephele accentifera (Palisot de Beauvois, 1821)
- Nephele argentifera (Walker, 1856)
- Nephele bipartita Butler, 1878
- Nephele comma Hopffer, 1857
- Nephele peneus (Cramer, 1776)
- Nephele rosae Butler, 1875
- Odontosida magnificum (Rothschild, 1894)
- Oligographa juniperi (Boisduval, 1847)
- Phylloxiphia metria (Jordan, 1920)
- Platysphinx piabilis (Distant, 1897)
- Polyptychus baxteri Rothschild & Jordan, 1908
- Sphingonaepiopsis nana (Walker, 1856)
- Temnora marginata (Walker, 1856)
- Temnora zantus (Herrich-Schäffer, 1854)
- Theretra capensis (Linnaeus, 1764)
- Theretra monteironis (Butler, 1882)

== Thyrididae ==
- Arniocera auriguttata Hopffer, 1857
- Arniocera erythropyga (Wallengren, 1860)
- Banisia joccatia (Whalley, 1971)
- Banisia myrsusalis (Walker, 1859)
- Cecidothyris pexa (Hampson, 1906)
- Chrysotypus splendida (Warren, 1899)
- Dysodia constellata Warren, 1908
- Dysodia intermedia (Walker, 1865)
- Dysodia vitrina (Boisduval, 1829)
- Epaena candida Whalley, 1971
- Gnathodes helvella Whalley, 1971
- Hapana minima Whalley, 1971
- Hapana verticalis (Warren, 1899)
- Kalenga ansorgei (Warren, 1899)
- Kalenga culanota Whalley, 1971
- Kuja squamigera (Pagenstecher, 1892)
- Marmax smaragdina (Butler, 1888)
- Netrocera jordani Joicey & Talbot, 1921
- Rhodoneura flavicilia Hampson, 1906
- Rhodoneura roseola Whalley, 1971
- Rhodoneura sordidula (Plötz, 1880)

== Tineidae ==
- Acridotarsa melipecta (Meyrick, 1915)
- Ateliotum crymodes (Meyrick, 1908)
- Ceratophaga vastellus (Zeller, 1852)
- Crypsithyris insolita Meyrick, 1918
- Drosica abjectella Walker, 1963
- Ellochotis ectocharis Gozmány, 1976
- Ellochotis lyncodes (Meyrick, 1921)
- Enargocrasis galactopis (Meyrick, 1921)
- Lysitona euryacta Meyrick, 1918
- Machaeropteris eribapta Meyrick, 1915
- Monopis megalodelta Meyrick, 1908
- Opogona amphichorda Meyrick, 1921
- Oxymachaeris euryzancla Meyrick, 1918
- Perissomastix montis Gozmány, 1968
- Perissomastix pyroxantha (Meyrick, 1914)
- Pitharcha atrisecta (Meyrick, 1918)
- Scalmatica myelodes (Meyrick, 1921)
- Scalmatica phaulocentra (Meyrick, 1921)
- Sphallestasis mahunkai Gozmány, 1976

== Tortricidae ==
- Afroploce karsholti Aarvik, 2004
- Ancylis impatiens (Meyrick, 1921)
- Bactra triceps Diakonoff, 1963
- Choristoneura heliaspis (Meyrick, 1909)
- Coniostola calculosa (Meyrick, 1913)
- Coniostola lobostola (Meyrick, 1918)
- Crocidosema leptozona (Meyrick, 1921)
- Cydia trigonoptila (Meyrick, 1921)
- Eccopsis affluens (Meyrick, 1921)
- Eccopsis wahlbergiana Zeller, 1852
- Eucosma haematospila Meyrick, 1921
- Fulcrifera aphrospila (Meyrick, 1921)
- Geita micrograpta (Meyrick, 1921)
- Lobesia deltophora (Meyrick, 1921)
- Metendothenia balanacma (Meyrick, 1914)
- Olethreutes lutipennis (Meyrick, 1921)
- Olethreutes niphadastra (Meyrick, 1921)
- Paraeccopsis insellata (Meyrick, 1920)
- Paraeccopsis phoeniodes (Meyrick, 1921)

== Uraniidae ==
- Epiplema anomala Janse, 1932

== Xyloryctidae ==
- Scythris clemens Meyrick, 1921
- Scythris concurrens Meyrick, 1921

== Yponomeutidae ==
- Amalthina lacteata Meyrick, 1914
- Teinoptila puncticornis (Walsingham, 1891)
- Yponomeuta strigillatus Zeller, 1852

== Zygaenidae ==
- Astyloneura meridionalis (Hampson, 1920)
- Epiorna ochreipennis (Butler, 1874)
- Tasema fulvithorax Hampson, 1920
