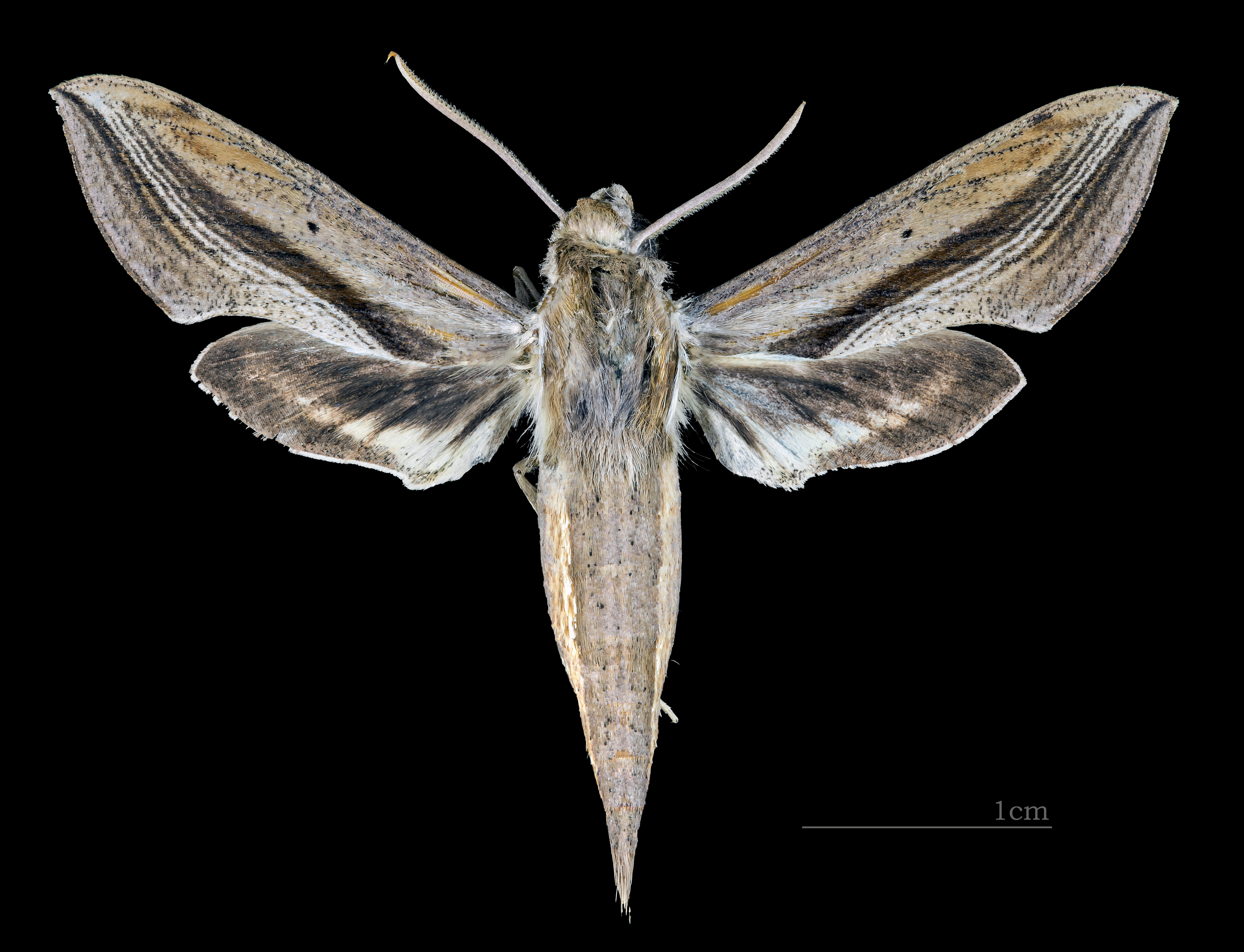
- Male, dorsal view
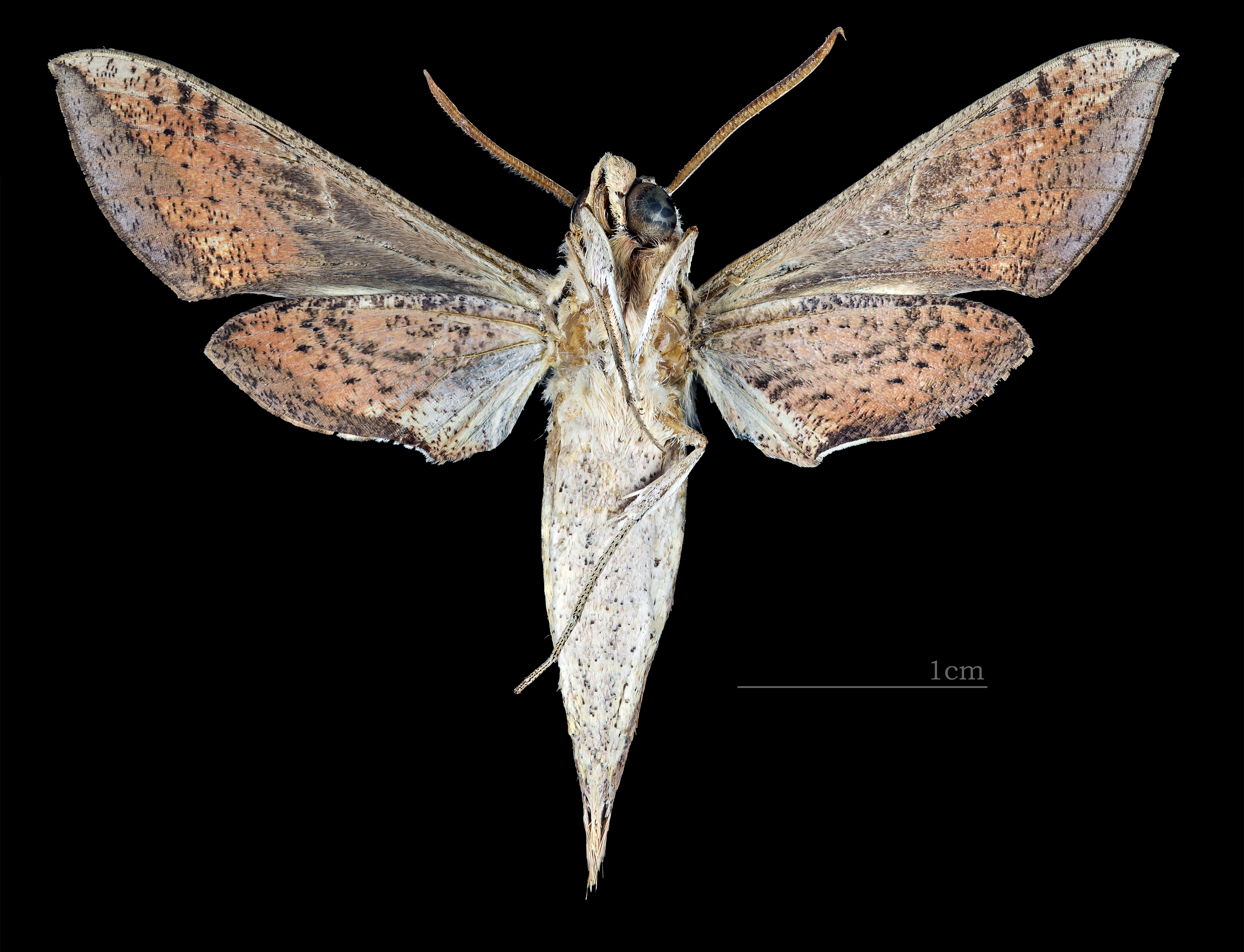
- Male, ventral view

Scientific classification
- Kingdom: Animalia
- Phylum: Arthropoda
- Class: Insecta
- Order: Lepidoptera
- Family: Sphingidae
- Genus: Xylophanes
- Species: X. robinsonii

Binomial name
- Xylophanes robinsonii (Grote, 1865)

Synonyms
- Chaerocampa robinsonii Grote, 1865; Chaerocampa curvatus Schaufuss, 1870

= Xylophanes robinsonii =

Species of moth

Xylophanes robinsonii is a moth of the family Sphingidae first described by Augustus Radcliffe Grote in 1865. It is known from Cuba.

The length of the forewings is about 22 mm. It is similar to Theretra monteironis and Xylophanes fosteri but smaller and the postmedian lines on the forewing upperside are better developed. The tegula has a golden-yellow midline. The forewing upperside is similar to Xylophanes fosteri but the discal spot has no darker dashes or a darker cloud immediately distal to it. The second postmedian line is distally double.

Adults are probably on wing year round.

The larvae possibly feed on Psychotria panamensis, Psychotria nervosa and Pavonia guanacastensis.
