= Paurophleps minuta =

Scientific classification
- Kingdom: Animalia
- Phylum: Arthropoda
- Class: Insecta
- Order: Lepidoptera
- Superfamily: Noctuoidea
- Family: Erebidae
- Subfamily: Arctiinae
- Genus: Paurophleps
- Species: P. minuta

Binomial name
- Paurophleps minuta Hampson, 1900

Species of moth

Paurophleps minuta is a moth in the subfamily Arctiinae. It is found in South Africa.
