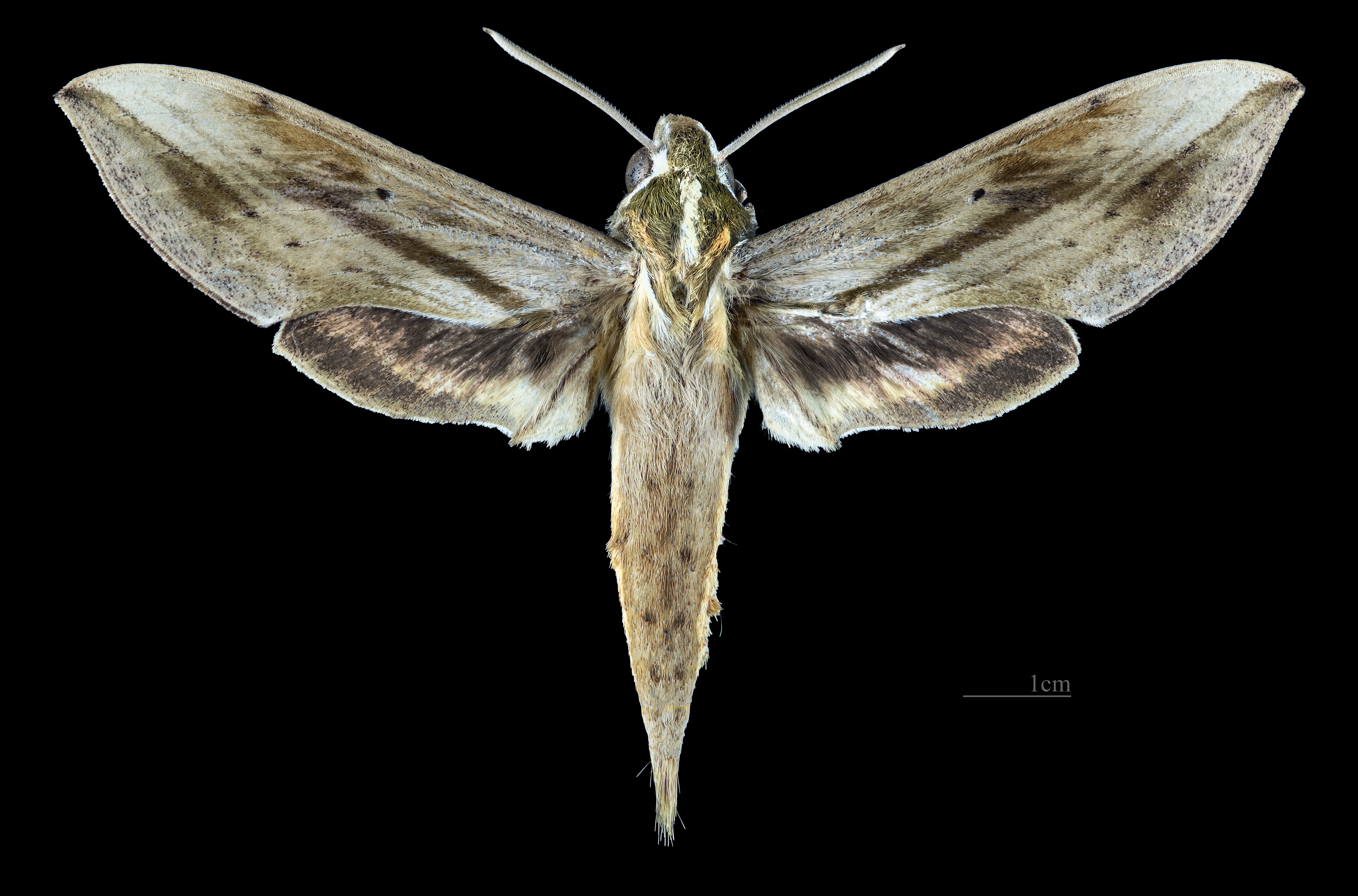
- Male dorsal
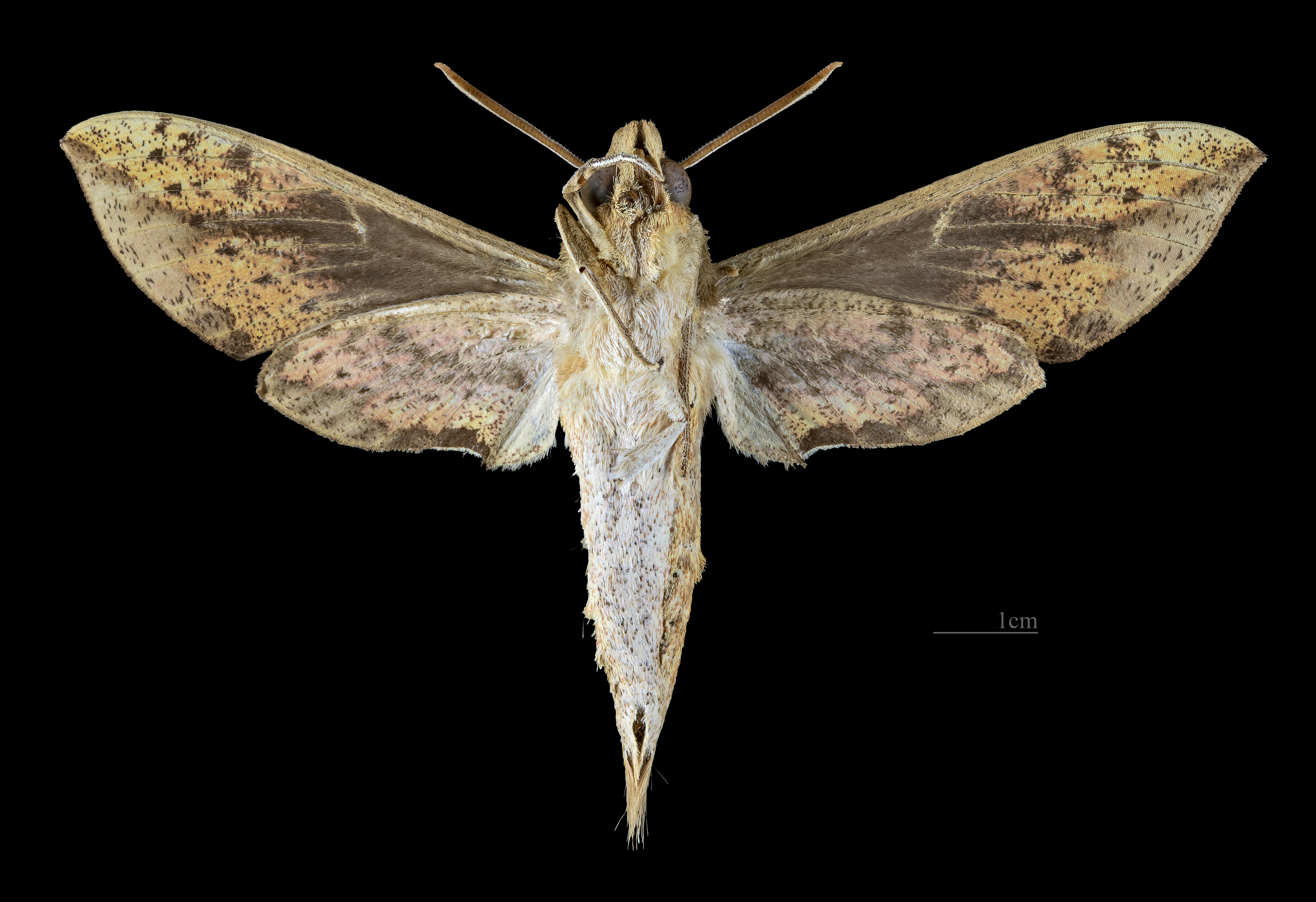
- Male ventral

Scientific classification
- Domain: Eukaryota
- Kingdom: Animalia
- Phylum: Arthropoda
- Class: Insecta
- Order: Lepidoptera
- Family: Sphingidae
- Genus: Xylophanes
- Species: X. fosteri

Binomial name
- Xylophanes fosteri Rothschild & Jordan, 1906

Synonyms
- Xylophanes isaon nanus (Raymundo da Silva, 1934)

= Xylophanes fosteri =

Species of moth

Xylophanes fosteri is a moth of the family Sphingidae. It is known from Paraguay, but is probably also found in Argentina.

The length of the forewings is about 30 mm for males and 33 mm for females. It is similar to Xylophanes turbata. Differences in the forewing upperside are two short dashes distal to the discal spot which are blurred into a diffuse patch. The first and second postmedian lines are merged into a broad band at the inner margin of the wing, gradually diverging towards the apex but disappearing later. The fourth and fifth postmedian lines are parallel at first, but divergent later and then disappearing. The fourth line is represented only by vein dots.

Adults are probably on wing year-round.

The larvae possibly feed on Psychotria panamensis, Psychotria nervosa and Pavonia guanacastensis.
