= Apotactis =

Scientific classification
- Domain: Eukaryota
- Kingdom: Animalia
- Phylum: Arthropoda
- Class: Insecta
- Order: Lepidoptera
- Family: Gelechiidae
- Subfamily: Gelechiinae
- Genus: Apotactis; Meyrick, 1918

Genus of moths

Apotactis is a genus of moth in the family Gelechiidae.

== Species ==
- Apotactis drimylota Meyrick, 1918
- Apotactis citrophila Meyrick, 1933
