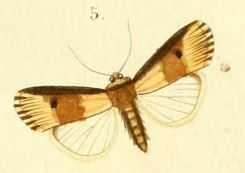

Scientific classification
- Domain: Eukaryota
- Kingdom: Animalia
- Phylum: Arthropoda
- Class: Insecta
- Order: Lepidoptera
- Superfamily: Noctuoidea
- Family: Noctuidae
- Subfamily: Noctuinae
- Genus: Amazonides; D. S. Fletcher, 1961

= Amazonides =

Genus of moths

Amazonides is a genus of moths of the family Noctuidae. The genus was described by David Stephen Fletcher in 1961.

== Species ==
- Amazonides ascia D. S. Fletcher, 1961
- Amazonides asciodes Berio, 1972
- Amazonides atrisigna (Hampson, 1911)
- Amazonides atrisignoides Laporte, 1974
- Amazonides aulombardi Hacker & Legrain, 2002
- Amazonides axyliaesimilis (Berio, 1939)
- Amazonides berliozi Laporte, 1974
- Amazonides bioculata Berio, 1974
- Amazonides confluxa (Saalmuller, 1891)
- Amazonides dividens (Walker, 1857)
- Amazonides dubiomeodes Laporte, 1977
- Amazonides ecstrigata (Hampson, 1903)
- Amazonides elaeopis (Hampson, 1907)
- Amazonides epipyria (Hampson, 1903)
- Amazonides fumicolor (Hampson, 1902)
- Amazonides fuscirufa (Hampson, 1903)
- Amazonides griseofusca (Hampson, 1913)
- Amazonides intermedia Berio, 1972
- Amazonides invertita Berio, 1962
- Amazonides koffoleense Laporte, 1977
- Amazonides laheuderiae Laporte, 1984
- Amazonides menieri Laporte, 1974
- Amazonides pseudoberliozi Rougeot & Laporte, 1983
- Amazonides putrefacta (Guenée, 1852)
- Amazonides rufescens (Hampson, 1913)
- Amazonides ruficeps (Hampson, 1903)
- Amazonides rufomixta (Hampson, 1903)
- Amazonides tabida (Guenée, 1852)
- Amazonides ustula (Hampson, 1913)
- Amazonides zarajokobi Laporte, 1984
