= Crinipus pictipes =

Scientific classification
- Kingdom: Animalia
- Phylum: Arthropoda
- Class: Insecta
- Order: Lepidoptera
- Family: Sesiidae
- Genus: Crinipus
- Species: C. pictipes

Binomial name
- Crinipus pictipes (Hampson, 1919)

Synonyms
- Lepidopoda pictipes Hampson, 1919

Species of moth

Crinipus pictipes is a moth of the family Sesiidae. It is known from Zambia.
