= Chrysocatharylla =

Scientific classification
- Domain: Eukaryota
- Kingdom: Animalia
- Phylum: Arthropoda
- Class: Insecta
- Order: Lepidoptera
- Family: Crambidae
- Subfamily: Crambinae
- Tribe: Calamotrophini
- Genus: Chrysocatharylla; Bassi, 1999

Genus of moths

Chrysocatharylla is a genus of moths of the family Crambidae.

== Species ==
- Chrysocatharylla agraphellus (Hampson, 1919)
- Chrysocatharylla ceylonella (Bleszynski, 1964)
- Chrysocatharylla gozmanyi Bassi, 1999
- Chrysocatharylla lucasi (Schouten, 1994)
- Chrysocatharylla oenescentellus (Hampson, 1896)

== Former species ==
- Chrysocatharylla fusca Bassi, 1999
