= Epichilo vartianae =

Scientific classification
- Kingdom: Animalia
- Phylum: Arthropoda
- Clade: Pancrustacea
- Class: Insecta
- Order: Lepidoptera
- Family: Crambidae
- Subfamily: Crambinae
- Tribe: Crambini
- Genus: Epichilo
- Species: E. vartianae

Binomial name
- Epichilo vartianae Błeszyński, 1965

Species of moth

Epichilo vartianae is a moth in the family Crambidae. It was first described by Stanisław Błeszyński in 1965. It is found in Pakistan.
