= Paurophleps =

Scientific classification
- Kingdom: Animalia
- Phylum: Arthropoda
- Class: Insecta
- Order: Lepidoptera
- Superfamily: Noctuoidea
- Family: Erebidae
- Subfamily: Arctiinae
- Tribe: Lithosiini
- Genus: Paurophleps; Hampson, 1900

Synonyms
- Cycloptera Janse, 1964; Cyclopterana D. S. Fletcher, 1982

Genus of moths

Paurophleps is a genus of moths in the subfamily Arctiinae. It was described by George Hampson in 1900.

== Species ==
- Paurophleps minuta Hampson, 1900
- Paurophleps reducta (Janse, 1964)
