= Cycloponympha hermione =

Scientific classification
- Kingdom: Animalia
- Phylum: Arthropoda
- Class: Insecta
- Order: Lepidoptera
- Family: Lyonetiidae
- Genus: Cycloponympha
- Species: C. hermione

Binomial name
- Cycloponympha hermione Meyrick, 1921

Species of moth

Cycloponympha hermione is a moth in the Lyonetiidae family. It is known from Xinavane, Mozambique.

This species has a wingspan of 9 mm. Head and antennae are white, the forewings are white with the costal edge dark fuscous towards base and some pale ochreous suffusions and grey marks.

== Related pages ==
- List of moths of Mozambique
