= Crinipus =

Scientific classification
- Kingdom: Animalia
- Phylum: Arthropoda
- Class: Insecta
- Order: Lepidoptera
- Family: Sesiidae
- Tribe: Synanthedonini
- Genus: Crinipus; Hampson, 1896

Species
- See text

Synonyms
- Hypanthedon Hampson, 1919

Genus of moths

Crinipus is a genus of moths in the family Sesiidae.

== Species ==
- Crinipus leucozonipus (Hampson, 1896)
- Crinipus marisa (Druce, 1899)
- Crinipus pictipes (Hampson, 1919)
- Crinipus vassei (Le Cerf, 1917)
