= Cuneisigna =

- Cuneisigna cumamita

Scientific classification
- Domain: Eukaryota
- Kingdom: Animalia
- Phylum: Arthropoda
- Class: Insecta
- Order: Lepidoptera
- Superfamily: Noctuoidea
- Family: Noctuidae (?)
- Subfamily: Catocalinae
- Genus: Cuneisigna

Genus of moths

Cuneisigna is a genus of moths of the family Noctuidae.

== Species ==
- Cuneisigna cumamita (Bethune-Baker, 1911)
- Cuneisigna obstans (Walker, 1858)
- Cuneisigna rivulata (Hampson, 1902)
