= Chrysocatharylla gozmanyi =

Scientific classification
- Kingdom: Animalia
- Phylum: Arthropoda
- Class: Insecta
- Order: Lepidoptera
- Family: Crambidae
- Subfamily: Crambinae
- Tribe: Calamotrophini
- Genus: Chrysocatharylla
- Species: C. gozmanyi

Binomial name
- Chrysocatharylla gozmanyi Bassi, 1999

Species of moth

Chrysocatharylla gozmanyi is a moth in the family Crambidae. It was described by Graziano Bassi in 1999. It is found in Ghana.
