= Cuneisigna rivulata =

Scientific classification
- Kingdom: Animalia
- Phylum: Arthropoda
- Class: Insecta
- Order: Lepidoptera
- Superfamily: Noctuoidea
- Family: Noctuidae (?)
- Genus: Cuneisigna
- Species: C. rivulata

Binomial name
- Cuneisigna rivulata (Hampson, 1902)

Synonyms
- Chalciope rivulata Hampson, 1902

Species of moth

Cuneisigna rivulata is a moth of the family Noctuidae first described by George Hampson in 1902. It is found in Kenya and South Africa.
