= Crinipus leucozonipus =

Scientific classification
- Kingdom: Animalia
- Phylum: Arthropoda
- Clade: Pancrustacea
- Class: Insecta
- Order: Lepidoptera
- Family: Sesiidae
- Genus: Crinipus
- Species: C. leucozonipus

Binomial name
- Crinipus leucozonipus Hampson, 1896

Species of moth

Crinipus leucozonipus is a moth of the family Sesiidae. It is known from Yemen.
