= Apotactis citrophila =

Scientific classification
- Domain: Eukaryota
- Kingdom: Animalia
- Phylum: Arthropoda
- Class: Insecta
- Order: Lepidoptera
- Family: Gelechiidae
- Genus: Apotactis
- Species: A. citrophila

Binomial name
- Apotactis citrophila Meyrick, 1933

Synonyms
- Apotactis citroptila

Species of moth

Apotactis citrophila is a species of moth in the family Gelechiidae. It was described by Edward Meyrick in 1933. It is found in Costa Rica.
