= Cycloponympha perspicua =

Scientific classification
- Kingdom: Animalia
- Phylum: Arthropoda
- Class: Insecta
- Order: Lepidoptera
- Family: Lyonetiidae
- Genus: Cycloponympha
- Species: C. perspicua

Binomial name
- Cycloponympha perspicua Meyrick, 1913

Species of moth

Cycloponympha perspicua is a moth in the family Lyonetiidae. It is known from South Africa.
