= Orygocera propycnota =

Scientific classification
- Kingdom: Animalia
- Phylum: Arthropoda
- Clade: Pancrustacea
- Class: Insecta
- Order: Lepidoptera
- Family: Oecophoridae
- Genus: Orygocera
- Species: O. propycnota

Binomial name
- Orygocera propycnota Meyrick, 1930

Species of moth

Orygocera propycnota is a species of moth of the family Oecophoridae. It is known from Toamasina, Madagascar.

The wingspan is about 20 mm.
