= Eulophota =

Scientific classification
- Kingdom: Animalia
- Phylum: Arthropoda
- Class: Insecta
- Order: Lepidoptera
- Family: Pyralidae
- Subfamily: Phycitinae
- Genus: Eulophota; Hampson, 1926

Genus of moths

Eulophota is a genus of snout moths. It was described by George Hampson in 1926.

== Species ==
- Eulophota bipars de Joannis, 1927
- Eulophota caustella (Hampson in Ragonot, 1901)
- Eulophota floridella de Joannis, 1927
- Eulophota pretoriella de Joannis, 1927
- Eulophota simplex de Joannis, 1927
- Eulophota zonata Hampson, 1926
