= Asapharcha strigifera =

Scientific classification
- Kingdom: Animalia
- Phylum: Arthropoda
- Class: Insecta
- Order: Lepidoptera
- Family: Gelechiidae
- Genus: Asapharcha
- Species: A. strigifera

Binomial name
- Asapharcha strigifera Meyrick, 1920

Species of moth

Asapharcha strigifera is a species of moth in the family Gelechiidae. It was described by Edward Meyrick in 1920. It is found in South Africa.

The wingspan is 17–18 mm. The forewings are ochreous whitish, the costal edge ochreous yellow and with irregularly strewn dark fuscous transverse strigulae arranged along the costa from the base to about three-fourths, and forming a sparse irregular group towards the median third of the dorsum, and a denser patch suffused in the centre between the cell and termen. The stigmata are dark fuscous, the plical somewhat elongate, beneath the first discal. The hindwings are rather dark grey.
