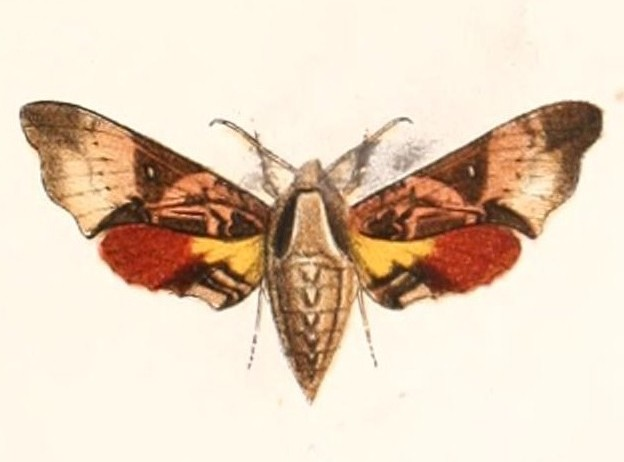
- Odontosida magnificum

Scientific classification
- Domain: Eukaryota
- Kingdom: Animalia
- Phylum: Arthropoda
- Class: Insecta
- Order: Lepidoptera
- Family: Sphingidae
- Subtribe: Macroglossina
- Genus: Odontosida; Rothschild & Jordan, 1903

= Odontosida =

Genus of moths

Odontosida is a genus of moths in the family Sphingidae. The genus was erected by Walter Rothschild and Karl Jordan in 1903.

== Species ==
- Odontosida magnificum - (Rothschild 1894)
- Odontosida pusillus - (R. Felder 1874)
