= Orygocera =

Scientific classification
- Kingdom: Animalia
- Phylum: Arthropoda
- Clade: Pancrustacea
- Class: Insecta
- Order: Lepidoptera
- Family: Oecophoridae
- Subfamily: Oecophorinae
- Genus: Orygocera; Walsingham, 1897

Type species
- Orygocera carnicolor Walsingham, 1897

Synonyms
- Rhozale Viette, 1954

Genus of moths

Orygocera is a genus of moths in the family Oecophoridae.

== Species ==
- Orygocera albanix Bippus, 2020 (from Réunion)
- Orygocera ambavaella Viette, 1988 (from Madagascar)
- Orygocera amphichelota Meyrick, 1930
- Orygocera amphitricha (Meyrick, 1910)
- Orygocera ampolomitella (Viette, 1958) (from Madagascar)
- Orygocera anderesi Viette, 1991 (from Réunion)
- Orygocera andilambella (Viette, 1985)
- Orygocera aurea (Viette, 1954) (from Madagascar)
- Orygocera befasyella Viette, 1988 (from Madagascar)
- Orygocera carnicolor Walsingham, 1897
- Orygocera dubiosella (Viette, 1987) (from Madagascar)
- Orygocera fosaella (Viette, 1958) (from Madagascar)
- Orygocera griveaudella (Viette, 1985)
- Orygocera indranoella (Viette, 1985)
- Orygocera lemuriella (Viette, 1958)
- Orygocera lenobapta Meyrick, 1924 (from Rodrigues Island)
- Orygocera magdalena Meyrick, 1930
- Orygocera marianka (Viette, 1987)
- Orygocera minetorum (Viette, 1987) (from Madagascar)
- Orygocera mokotraella (Viette, 1985) (from Madagascar)
- Orygocera occidentella (Viette, 1967) (from Madagascar)
- Orygocera pauliani (Viette, 1949) (from Madagascar)
- Orygocera perinetella Viette, 1988 (from Madagascar)
- Orygocera propycnota Meyrick, 1930
- Orygocera recordata Meyrick, 1921 (from Mozambique)
- Orygocera rungsella (Viette, 1956) (from Madagascar)
- Orygocera rusetella Viette, 1988 (from Madagascar)
- Orygocera sarcopa (Meyrick, 1909) (from South Africa)
- Orygocera silvestriella (Viette, 1956)
- Orygocera soaella (Viette, 1968) (from Madagascar)
- Orygocera subnivea (Viette, 1954)
- Orygocera tricolorella (Viette, 1958)
- Orygocera vadonella (Viette, 1985)
