= Araeophylla =

Scientific classification
- Domain: Eukaryota
- Kingdom: Animalia
- Phylum: Arthropoda
- Class: Insecta
- Order: Lepidoptera
- Family: Gelechiidae
- Subfamily: Gelechiinae
- Genus: Araeophylla; Janse, 1954

Genus of moths

Araeophylla is a genus of moth in the family Gelechiidae.

== Species ==
- Araeophylla flavigutella (Bruand, [1851])
- Araeophylla lachtensis (Erschoff, [1877])
- Araeophylla languidella (Amsel, 1936)
- Araeophylla natrixella (Weber, 1945)
- Araeophylla spiladias (Meyrick, 1921)
