= Stilbosis cyclocosma =

Scientific classification
- Kingdom: Animalia
- Phylum: Arthropoda
- Class: Insecta
- Order: Lepidoptera
- Family: Cosmopterigidae
- Genus: Stilbosis
- Species: S. cyclocosma

Binomial name
- Stilbosis cyclocosma (Meyrick, 1921)

Synonyms
- Mompha cyclocosma Meyrick, 1921

Species of moth

Stilbosis cyclocosma is a moth in the family Cosmopterigidae. It was described by Edward Meyrick in 1921. It is found in Mozambique.

This species has a wingspan of 15–17 mm. Its forewings are dark-purplish fuscous with a circular whitish subbasal area containing a large grey raised costal spot.

== See also ==
- List of moths of Mozambique
