= Chrysocatharylla ceylonella =

Scientific classification
- Domain: Eukaryota
- Kingdom: Animalia
- Phylum: Arthropoda
- Class: Insecta
- Order: Lepidoptera
- Family: Crambidae
- Subfamily: Crambinae
- Tribe: Calamotrophini
- Genus: Chrysocatharylla
- Species: C. ceylonella

Binomial name
- Chrysocatharylla ceylonella (Błeszyński, 1964)

Synonyms
- Pseudocatharylla oenescentella ceylonella Błeszyński, 1964

Species of moth

Chrysocatharylla ceylonella is a moth in the family Crambidae. It was described by Stanisław Błeszyński in 1964. It is found in Sri Lanka.
