= Eulophota caustella =

Scientific classification
- Kingdom: Animalia
- Phylum: Arthropoda
- Class: Insecta
- Order: Lepidoptera
- Family: Pyralidae
- Genus: Eulophota
- Species: E. caustella

Binomial name
- Eulophota caustella (Hampson in Ragonot, 1901)

Synonyms
- Pristarthria caustella Hampson in Ragonot, 1901

Species of moth

Eulophota caustella is a species of snout moth in the genus Eulophota. It was described by George Hampson in 1901, and is known from South Africa.
