= Chrysocatharylla lucasi =

Scientific classification
- Kingdom: Animalia
- Phylum: Arthropoda
- Class: Insecta
- Order: Lepidoptera
- Family: Crambidae
- Subfamily: Crambinae
- Tribe: Calamotrophini
- Genus: Chrysocatharylla
- Species: C. lucasi

Binomial name
- Chrysocatharylla lucasi (Schouten, 1994)

Synonyms
- Chrysocatharylla lucasi bathurstella Bassi, 1999

Species of moth

Chrysocatharylla lucasi is a moth in the family Crambidae. It was described by Schouten in 1994. It is found in Kenya, South Africa and Tanzania.
