= Araeophylla natrixella =

Scientific classification
- Domain: Eukaryota
- Kingdom: Animalia
- Phylum: Arthropoda
- Class: Insecta
- Order: Lepidoptera
- Family: Gelechiidae
- Genus: Araeophylla
- Species: A. natrixella

Binomial name
- Araeophylla natrixella (Weber, 1945)

Synonyms
- Schützeia natrixella Weber, 1945

Species of moth

Araeophylla natrixella is a species of moth in the family Gelechiidae. It was described by Weber in 1945. It is found in Switzerland.
