= Tricerophora =

Scientific classification
- Domain: Eukaryota
- Kingdom: Animalia
- Phylum: Arthropoda
- Class: Insecta
- Order: Lepidoptera
- Family: Gelechiidae
- Subfamily: Gelechiinae
- Genus: Tricerophora; Janse, 1958

Synonyms
- Leucophylla Janse, 1960

Genus of moths

Tricerophora is a genus of moths in the family Gelechiidae erected by Anthonie Johannes Theodorus Janse in 1958.

== Species ==
- Tricerophora commaculata (Meyrick, 1921) Mozambique, South Africa, Zimbabwe
- Tricerophora nigribasis (Janse, 1960) South Africa, Namibia
- Tricerophora pundamilia Bidzilya & Mey, 2018 South Africa
- Tricerophora rukinga Bidzilya & Mey, 2018 Kenya
- Tricerophora objecta (Meyrick, 1921) Zimbabwe, Congo
- Tricerophora brumale Bidzilya & Mey, 2018 Namibia
- Tricerophora nigrinervis Bidzilya & Mey, 2018 South Africa, Namibia
- Tricerophora acutivalva Bidzilya & Mey, 2018 southern Iran
- Tricerophora minimorum Bidzilya & Mey, 2018 Namibia
