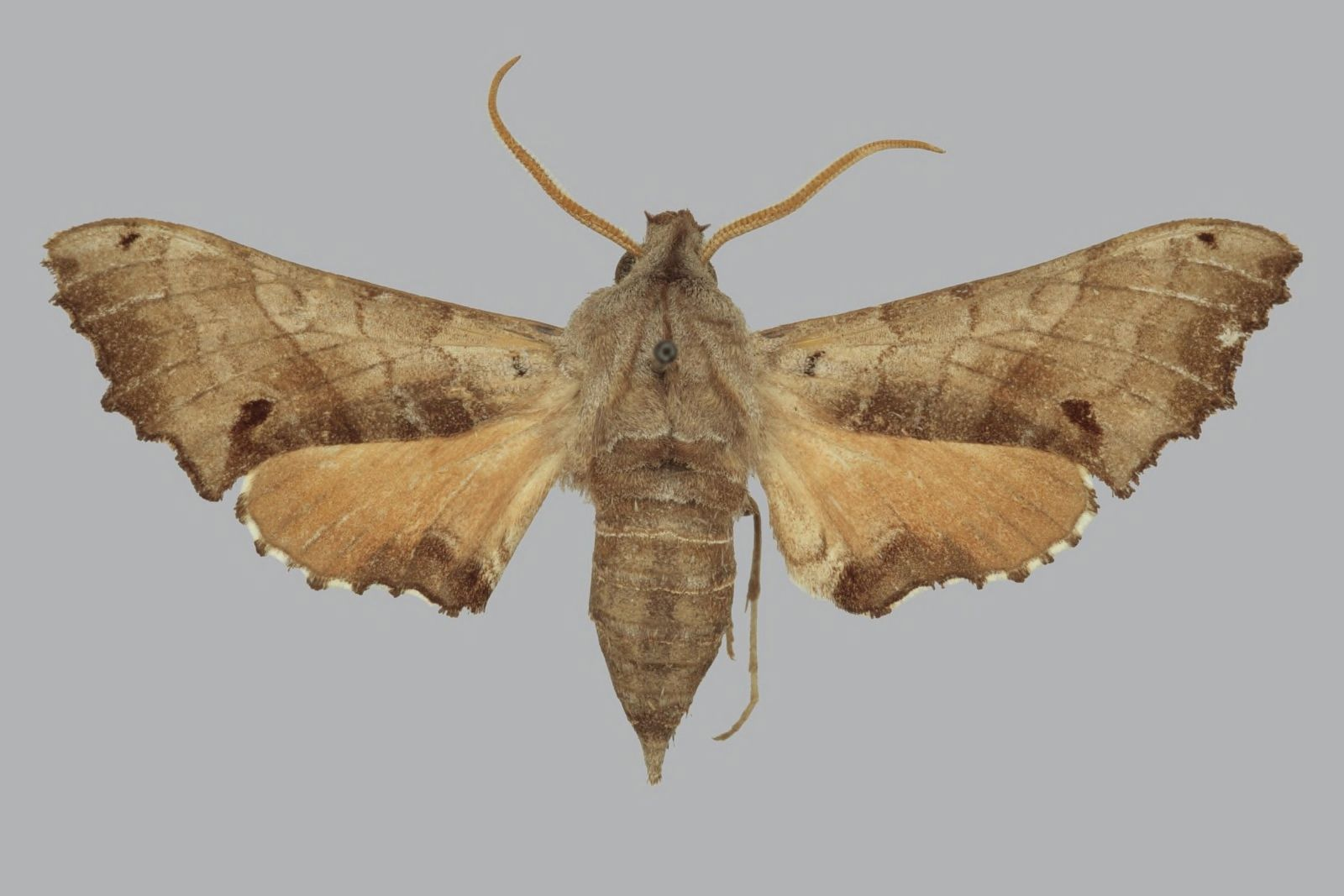

Scientific classification
- Domain: Eukaryota
- Kingdom: Animalia
- Phylum: Arthropoda
- Class: Insecta
- Order: Lepidoptera
- Family: Sphingidae
- Genus: Odontosida
- Species: O. pusillus

Binomial name
- Odontosida pusillus (R. Felder, 1874)

Synonyms
- Smerinthus pusillus R. Felder, 1874; Lophuron pulcherrimum Rothschild, 1894

= Odontosida pusillus =

Species of moth

Odontosida pusillus is a moth of the family Sphingidae first described by Rudolf Felder in 1874. It is known from South Africa.

The larvae feed on Hermannia species.
