= Epichilo =

Scientific classification
- Kingdom: Animalia
- Phylum: Arthropoda
- Clade: Pancrustacea
- Class: Insecta
- Order: Lepidoptera
- Family: Crambidae
- Subfamily: Crambinae
- Tribe: Crambini
- Genus: Epichilo; Ragonot in de Joannis & Ragonot, 1889

Genus of moths

Epichilo is a genus of moths of the family Crambidae.

== Species ==
- Epichilo irroralis (Hampson, 1919)
- Epichilo obscurefasciellus (de Joannis, 1927)
- Epichilo parvellus Ragonot in de Joannis & Ragonot, 1889
- Epichilo vartianae Błeszyński, 1965
