= Audeoudia haltica =

Scientific classification
- Kingdom: Animalia
- Phylum: Arthropoda
- Class: Insecta
- Order: Lepidoptera
- Family: Pyralidae
- Genus: Audeoudia
- Species: A. haltica

Binomial name
- Audeoudia haltica Meyrick, 1933

Species of moth

Audeoudia haltica is a species of snout moth in the genus Audeoudia. It was described by Edward Meyrick in 1933 and is known from Tanzania.

The larvae feed on the fruit of Euphorbia species.
