= Aenigmina aenea =

Scientific classification
- Kingdom: Animalia
- Phylum: Arthropoda
- Class: Insecta
- Order: Lepidoptera
- Family: Sesiidae
- Genus: Aenigmina
- Species: A. aenea

Binomial name
- Aenigmina aenea Le Cerf, 1912

Species of moth

Aenigmina aenea is a moth of the family Sesiidae. It is known from Tanzania.
