= Opogona amphichorda =

Scientific classification
- Kingdom: Animalia
- Phylum: Arthropoda
- Class: Insecta
- Order: Lepidoptera
- Family: Tineidae
- Genus: Opogona
- Species: O. amphichorda

Binomial name
- Opogona amphichorda Meyrick, 1921

Species of moth

Opogona amphichorda is a moth of the family Tineidae. It was described by Edward Meyrick in 1921 and is found in Congo and in Mozambique. This species has a wingspan of 10–13 millimetres (0.39–0.51 in). Its forewings are pale ochreous-yellowish with a dark fuscous pointed streak along basal fourth of the costa.

== Related pages ==
- List of moths of Mozambique
- List of moths of the Democratic Republic of Congo
