= Araeophylla lachtensis =

Scientific classification
- Kingdom: Animalia
- Phylum: Arthropoda
- Class: Insecta
- Order: Lepidoptera
- Family: Gelechiidae
- Genus: Araeophylla
- Species: A. lachtensis

Binomial name
- Araeophylla lachtensis (Erschoff, [1877])

Synonyms
- Gelechia (Anacampsis) lachtensis Erschoff, [1877]

Species of moth

Araeophylla lachtensis is a species of moth in the family Gelechiidae. It was described by Nikolay Grigoryevich Erschoff in 1877. It is found in Russia.
