= Araeophylla flavigutella =

Scientific classification
- Domain: Eukaryota
- Kingdom: Animalia
- Phylum: Arthropoda
- Class: Insecta
- Order: Lepidoptera
- Family: Gelechiidae
- Genus: Araeophylla
- Species: A. flavigutella

Binomial name
- Araeophylla flavigutella (Bruand, [1851])

Synonyms
- Lita flavigutella Bruand, [1851]

Species of moth

Araeophylla flavigutella is a species of moth in the family Gelechiidae. It was described by Charles Théophile Bruand d'Uzelle in 1851. It is found in southern France.
