= Aenigmina =

Scientific classification
- Domain: Eukaryota
- Kingdom: Animalia
- Phylum: Arthropoda
- Class: Insecta
- Order: Lepidoptera
- Family: Sesiidae
- Tribe: Osminiini
- Genus: Aenigmina; Le Cerf, 1912

Species
- See text

Genus of moths

Aenigmina is a genus of moths in the family Sesiidae.

== Species ==
- Aenigmina aenea Le Cerf, 1912
- Aenigmina critheis (Druce, 1899)
- Aenigmina latimargo Le Cerf, 1912
- Aenigmina tiresa (Druce, 1899)
