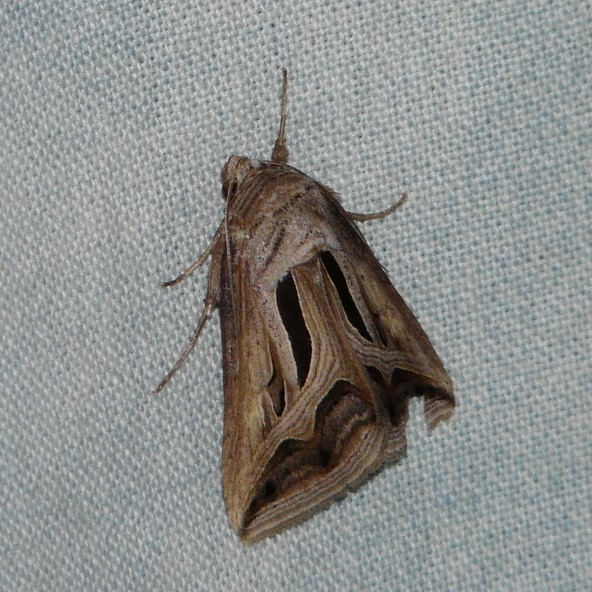

Scientific classification
- Domain: Eukaryota
- Kingdom: Animalia
- Phylum: Arthropoda
- Class: Insecta
- Order: Lepidoptera
- Superfamily: Noctuoidea
- Family: Noctuidae (?)
- Genus: Cuneisigna
- Species: C. cumamita

Binomial name
- Cuneisigna cumamita (Bethune-Baker, 1911)

Synonyms
- Chalciope cumamita Bethune-Baker, 1911

= Cuneisigna cumamita =

Species of moth

Cuneisigna cumamita is a species of moth in the family Noctuidae that was first described by George Thomas Bethune-Baker in 1911. It is found in Kenya and South Africa.
