= Asapharcha =

Scientific classification
- Domain: Eukaryota
- Kingdom: Animalia
- Phylum: Arthropoda
- Class: Insecta
- Order: Lepidoptera
- Family: Gelechiidae
- Subfamily: Gelechiinae
- Genus: Asapharcha; Meyrick, 1920

Synonyms
- Asapharca Clarke, 1955

Genus of moths

Asapharcha is a genus of moths in the family Gelechiidae.

== Species ==
- Asapharcha crateropa Meyrick, 1930
- Asapharcha strigifera Meyrick, 1920
