= Epichilo irroralis =

Scientific classification
- Kingdom: Animalia
- Phylum: Arthropoda
- Clade: Pancrustacea
- Class: Insecta
- Order: Lepidoptera
- Family: Crambidae
- Subfamily: Crambinae
- Tribe: Crambini
- Genus: Epichilo
- Species: E. irroralis

Binomial name
- Epichilo irroralis (Hampson, 1919)

Synonyms
- Culladia irroralis Hampson, 1919

Species of moth

Epichilo irroralis is a moth in the family Crambidae. It was described by George Hampson in 1919. It is found in Kenya.
