= Brenthia pleiadopa =

Scientific classification
- Domain: Eukaryota
- Kingdom: Animalia
- Phylum: Arthropoda
- Class: Insecta
- Order: Lepidoptera
- Family: Choreutidae
- Genus: Brenthia
- Species: B. pleiadopa

Binomial name
- Brenthia pleiadopa Meyrick, 1921

Species of moth

Brenthia pleiadopa is a species of moth of the family Choreutidae first described by Edward Meyrick in 1921. It is found in Magude, Mozambique.

The male has a wingspan of about 9 mm. The forewings are dark grey, slightly speckled with whitish and with a transverse line of whitish irroration near the base not reaching the dorsum and a suffused somewhat irregular whitish transverse line at one-fourth. There is an undefined transverse shade of whitish irroration from the middle of the costa to the middle of the dorsum, strongly excurved in the disc to pass around a transverse-oval discal ring of whitish irroration sometimes centrally tinged with pale brownish. A rather curved irregular broad fascia of whitish irroration is found from a white dot on the costa at three-fourths to the dorsum before the tornus, partially confluent with preceding in the disc and limited posteriorly by terminal markings. There is a marginal series of seven black subquadrate spots centred with silvery-metallic dots around the apex and termen, the first small and sometimes obsolescent, the fourth and fifth spots confluent (subapical), others separated by greyish-ochreous linear spaces. The hindwings are dark grey with an irregular discal spot of whitish suffusion before the middle, as well as a whitish subterminal line represented by a dot on the costa towards the apex, a transverse mark near the terminal streak in the middle, and a small mark on the tornus, as well as a moderate ochreous marginal streak around the apex and upper half of the termen, edged anteriorly on the apical portion by a pale silvery-blue mark.

== See also ==
- List of moths of Mozambique
