= Cycloponympha =

Scientific classification
- Kingdom: Animalia
- Phylum: Arthropoda
- Clade: Pancrustacea
- Class: Insecta
- Order: Lepidoptera
- Family: Lyonetiidae
- Genus: Cycloponympha; Meyrick, 1913

Synonyms
- Cyclonympha Neave, 1939

Genus of moths

Cycloponympha is a genus of moths belonging to the family Tineidae. or Lyonetiidae.

== Species ==
- Cycloponympha hermione Meyrick, 1921
- Cycloponympha julia Meyrick, 1913
- Cycloponympha perspicua Meyrick, 1913
