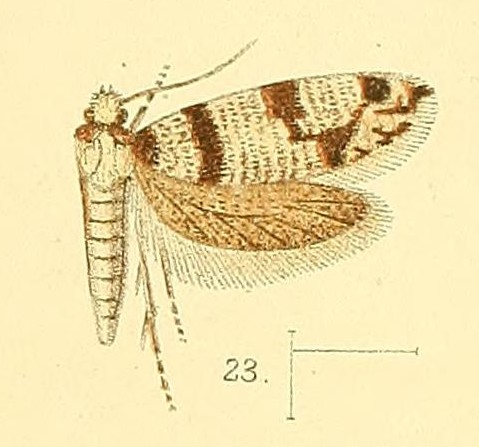
- Barbaroscardia fasciata

Scientific classification
- Kingdom: Animalia
- Phylum: Arthropoda
- Class: Insecta
- Order: Lepidoptera
- Family: Psychidae
- Subfamily: Taleporiinae
- Genus: Barbaroscardia; Walsingham, 1891

= Barbaroscardia =

Genus of moths

Barbaroscardia is a genus of moths in the family of Psychidae. It is only known from southern Africa (Mozambique & South Africa).

== Species ==
- Barbaroscardia fasciata Walshingham, 1891 (from Mozambique)
- Barbaroscardia metaclina Meyrick, 1920 (from South Africa)
