= Audeoudia =

Scientific classification
- Domain: Eukaryota
- Kingdom: Animalia
- Phylum: Arthropoda
- Class: Insecta
- Order: Lepidoptera
- Family: Pyralidae
- Subfamily: Phycitinae
- Genus: Audeoudia de Joannis, 1927

Genus of moths

Audeoudia is a genus of snout moths. It was described by Joseph de Joannis in 1927 and is known from Mozambique and Tanzania.

== Species ==
- Audeoudia grisella de Joannis, 1927
- Audeoudia haltica Meyrick, 1933
