= Rubukona =

Scientific classification
- Domain: Eukaryota
- Kingdom: Animalia
- Phylum: Arthropoda
- Class: Insecta
- Order: Lepidoptera
- Family: Sesiidae
- Tribe: Paranthrenini
- Genus: Rubukona; Fischer, 2007

Species
- See text

Genus of moths

Rubukona is a genus of moths in the family Sesiidae.

== Species ==
- Rubukona cuprescens (Hampson, 1919)
- Rubukona svetlanae Fischer, 2007
