= Epichilo parvellus =

Scientific classification
- Kingdom: Animalia
- Phylum: Arthropoda
- Clade: Pancrustacea
- Class: Insecta
- Order: Lepidoptera
- Family: Crambidae
- Subfamily: Crambinae
- Tribe: Crambini
- Genus: Epichilo
- Species: E. parvellus

Binomial name
- Epichilo parvellus Ragonot in de Joannis & Ragonot, 1889

Species of moth

Epichilo parvellus is a moth in the family Crambidae. It was described by Émile Louis Ragonot in 1889. It is found in India.
