= Eulophota zonata =

Scientific classification
- Kingdom: Animalia
- Phylum: Arthropoda
- Clade: Pancrustacea
- Class: Insecta
- Order: Lepidoptera
- Family: Pyralidae
- Genus: Eulophota
- Species: E. zonata

Binomial name
- Eulophota zonata Hampson, 1926

Species of moth

Eulophota zonata is a species of snout moth in the genus Eulophota. It was described by George Hampson in 1926 and is known from South Africa.
