= Aenigmina latimargo =

Scientific classification
- Domain: Eukaryota
- Kingdom: Animalia
- Phylum: Arthropoda
- Class: Insecta
- Order: Lepidoptera
- Family: Sesiidae
- Genus: Aenigmina
- Species: A. latimargo

Binomial name
- Aenigmina latimargo Le Cerf, 1912

Synonyms
- Aenigmina aenea var. latimargo

Species of moth

Aenigmina latimargo is a moth of the family Sesiidae. It is known from Tanzania.
