= Araeophylla languidella =

Scientific classification
- Domain: Eukaryota
- Kingdom: Animalia
- Phylum: Arthropoda
- Class: Insecta
- Order: Lepidoptera
- Family: Gelechiidae
- Genus: Araeophylla
- Species: A. languidella

Binomial name
- Araeophylla languidella (Amsel, 1936)

Synonyms
- Schützeia languidella Amsel, 1936

Species of moth

Araeophylla languidella is a species of moth in the family Gelechiidae. It was described by Hans Georg Amsel in 1936. It is found in Palestine.
