= Crinipus marisa =

Scientific classification
- Domain: Eukaryota
- Kingdom: Animalia
- Phylum: Arthropoda
- Class: Insecta
- Order: Lepidoptera
- Family: Sesiidae
- Genus: Crinipus
- Species: C. marisa

Binomial name
- Crinipus marisa (H. Druce, 1899)

Synonyms
- Aegeria marisa H. Druce, 1899; Hypanthedon marisa

Species of moth

Crinipus marisa is a moth of the family Sesiidae first described by Herbert Druce in 1899. It is known from Malawi and South Africa.
