= Yponomeuta strigillatus =

Scientific classification
- Kingdom: Animalia
- Phylum: Arthropoda
- Clade: Pancrustacea
- Class: Insecta
- Order: Lepidoptera
- Family: Yponomeutidae
- Genus: Yponomeuta
- Species: Y. strigillatus

Binomial name
- Yponomeuta strigillatus Zeller, 1852

Synonyms
- Hyponomeuta perficitellus Walker, 1863

Species of moth

Yponomeuta strigillatus is a moth of the family Yponomeutidae. It is known from Burundi, Cameroon, Ghana, Kenya, Mozambique, South Africa and Madagascar.
