= Rubukona cuprescens =

Scientific classification
- Kingdom: Animalia
- Phylum: Arthropoda
- Clade: Pancrustacea
- Class: Insecta
- Order: Lepidoptera
- Family: Sesiidae
- Genus: Rubukona
- Species: R. cuprescens

Binomial name
- Rubukona cuprescens (Hampson, 1919)

Synonyms
- Paranthrene cuprescens Hampson, 1919

Species of moth

Rubukona cuprescens is a moth of the family Sesiidae. It is known from Mozambique.
