= Albidopsis =

Scientific classification
- Kingdom: Animalia
- Phylum: Arthropoda
- Clade: Pancrustacea
- Class: Insecta
- Order: Lepidoptera
- Family: Psychidae
- Genus: Albidopsis; Bourgogne, 1975
- Species: A. major

Binomial name
- Albidopsis major (Heylaerts 1891)

Synonyms
- Monda major Heylaerts 1891

Genus of moths

Albidopis is a genus of Lepidoptera in the family Psychidae. It has only one described species, Albidopis major that is known from Mozambique.
