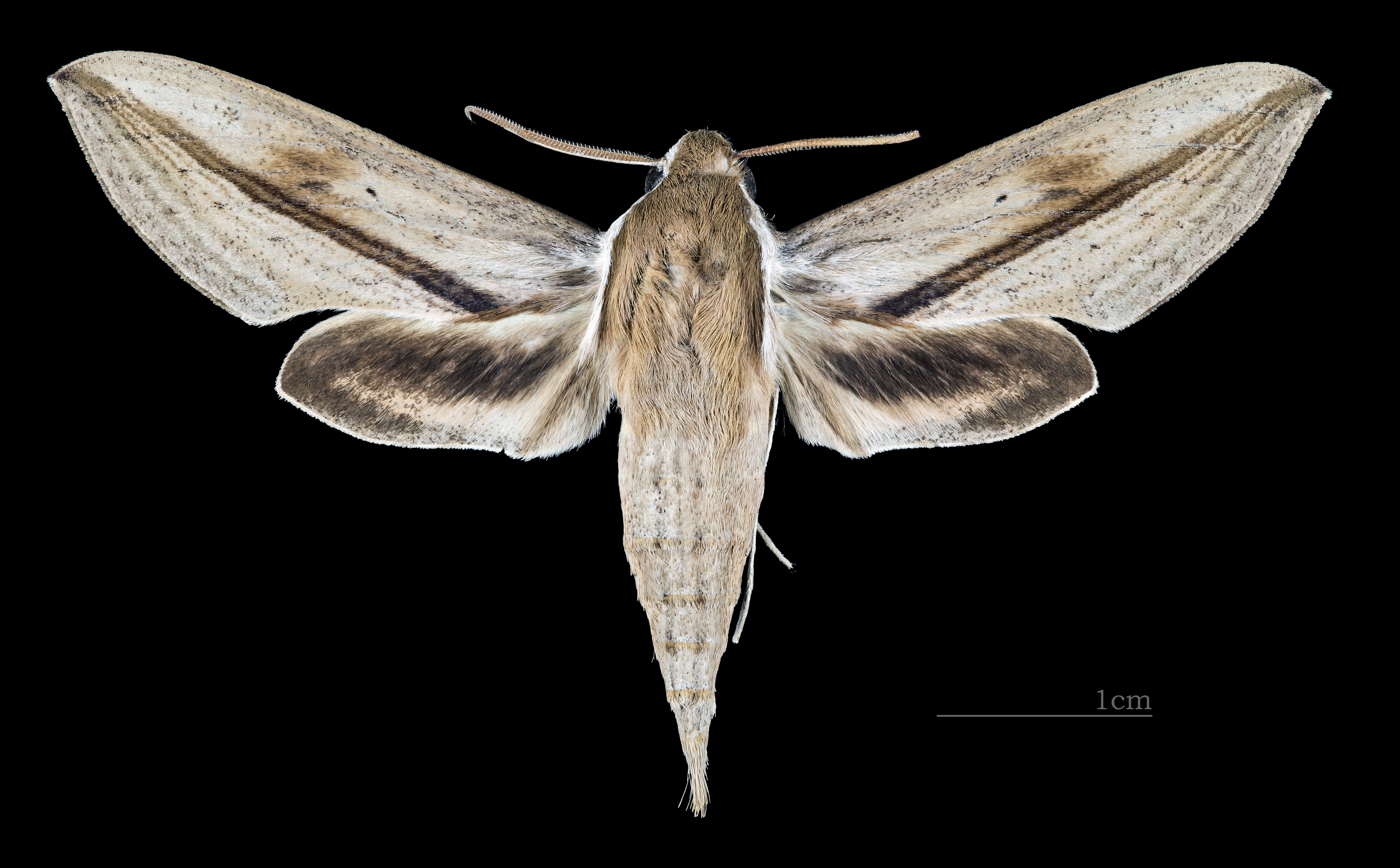
- Male dorsal view
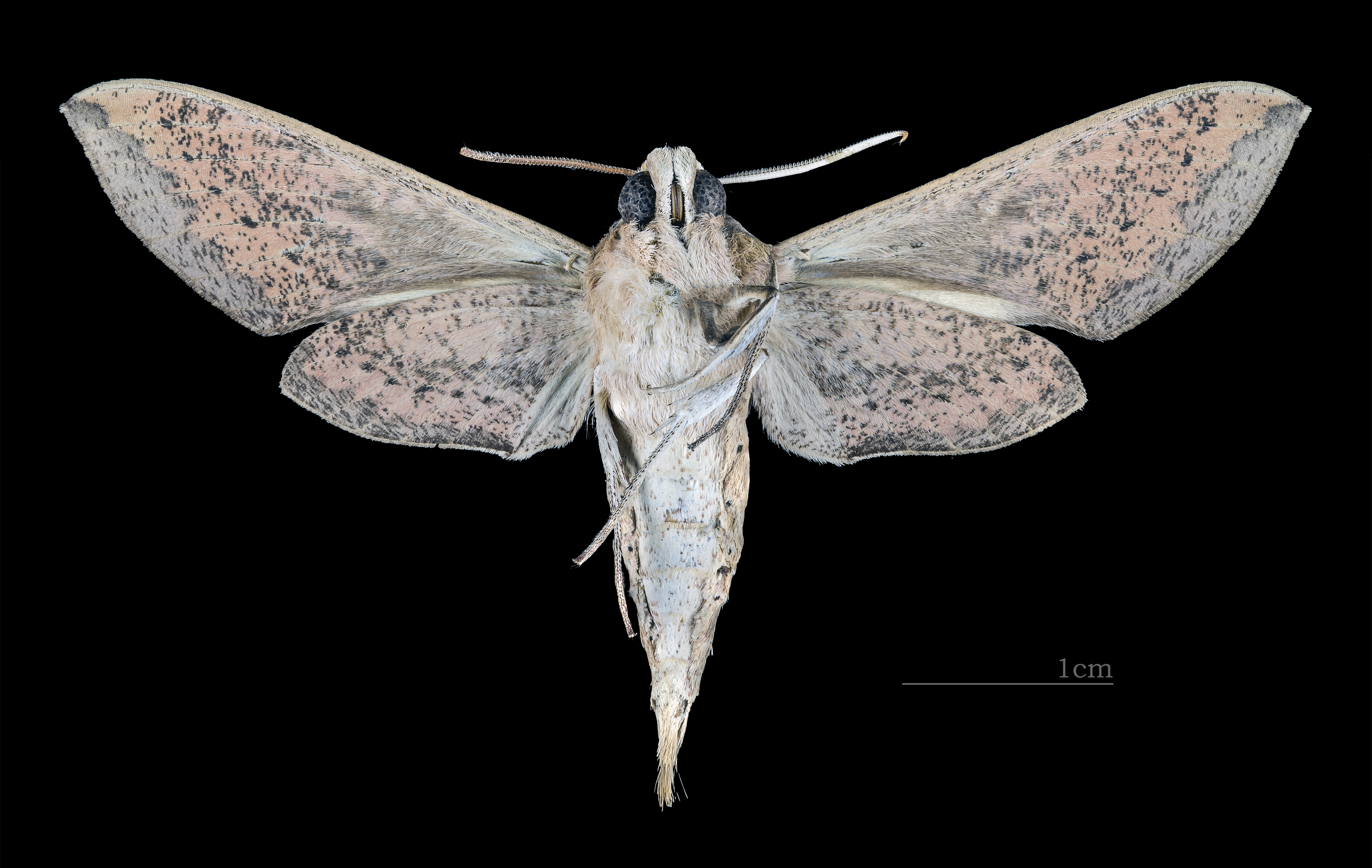
- Male ventral view

Scientific classification
- Domain: Eukaryota
- Kingdom: Animalia
- Phylum: Arthropoda
- Class: Insecta
- Order: Lepidoptera
- Family: Sphingidae
- Genus: Xylophanes
- Species: X. turbata

Binomial name
- Xylophanes turbata (H. Edwards, 1887)

Synonyms
- Choerocampa turbata H. Edwards, 1887

= Xylophanes turbata =

Species of moth

Xylophanes turbata is a moth of the family Sphingidae. It is known from Mexico to Nicaragua and Costa Rica. An occasional stray may be found up to southern Arizona.

The wingspan is 62–63 mm. The tegula are pale olive-green with a characteristic dark olive band along the outer margin immediately above the white outer margin. The forewing upperside is similar to that of Xylophanes tersa tersa but differs in the four postmedian lines all converging to the apex. The first and second postmedian bands are equal in intensity and stronger than the third and fourth lines. The fifth postmedian line is only weakly indicated. Immediately distal to small discal spot are two short, diffuse dashes. The hindwing upperside is dark brown and the median band is buff and diffuse.

There is one generation per year, with adults on wing in May, June and July in Costa Rica.

The larvae feed on Hamelia patens and Psychotria microdon and probably other Rubiaceae species. Larvae have brown and green color morphs.
