= Dichomeris straminis =

Scientific classification
- Domain: Eukaryota
- Kingdom: Animalia
- Phylum: Arthropoda
- Class: Insecta
- Order: Lepidoptera
- Family: Gelechiidae
- Genus: Dichomeris
- Species: D. straminis

Binomial name
- Dichomeris straminis (Walsingham, 1881)

Synonyms
- Ypsolophus straminis Walsingham, 1881; Iochares straminis

Species of moth

Dichomeris straminis is a moth in the family Gelechiidae. It was described by Thomas de Grey in 1881. It is found in Mozambique, South Africa and Zimbabwe.

The wingspan is about 18 mm. The forewings are pale straw-colour, with a pale ferruginous shade obliquely parallel to and near the apical margin, extending to the apex, but not quite to the anal angle, containing bright bluish purple metallic scales throughout its length. There is a ferruginous elongate discal spot about the middle of the wing, also containing some bright bluish purple metallic scales. Between this discal spot and the anal angle is a faint streak of ferruginous-brown scales, another slight streak of the same colour beyond the middle of the cell, reaching to the dark marginal shade. The hindwings are pale rather cinereous straw-colour.
