= Orygocera recordata =

Scientific classification
- Kingdom: Animalia
- Phylum: Arthropoda
- Class: Insecta
- Order: Lepidoptera
- Family: Oecophoridae
- Genus: Orygocera
- Species: O. recordata

Binomial name
- Orygocera recordata Meyrick, 1921

Species of moth

Orygocera recordata is a moth of the family Oecophoridae. It is known from Magude District, Mozambique.

This species has a wingspan of 12 mm. The forewings are pale ochreous suffused with rosy-pinkish and irrorated (sprinkled) with brownish and a few blackish specks.
