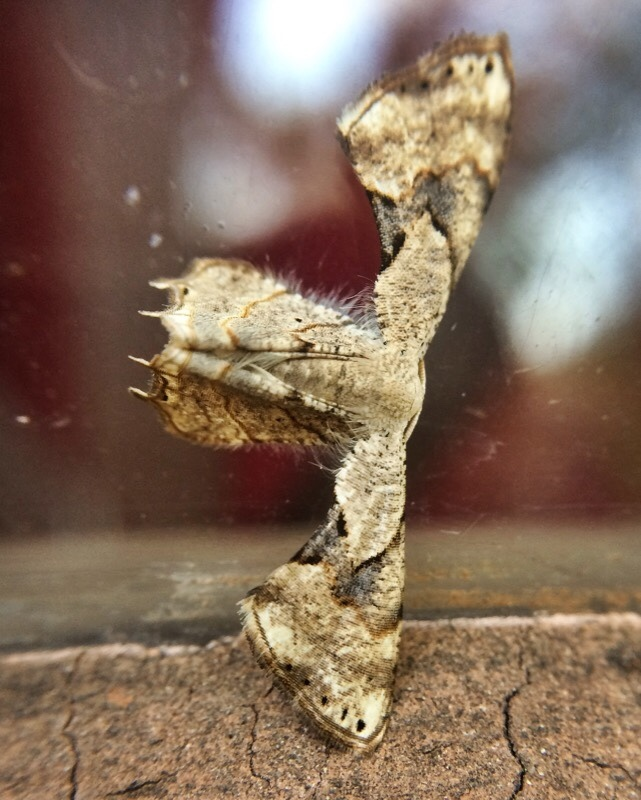

Scientific classification
- Kingdom: Animalia
- Phylum: Arthropoda
- Clade: Pancrustacea
- Class: Insecta
- Order: Lepidoptera
- Family: Uraniidae
- Genus: Epiplema
- Species: E. anomala

Binomial name
- Epiplema anomala Janse, 1932

= Epiplema anomala =

Species of insect

Epiplema anomala is a species from the genus Epiplema. The species was originally described by Anthonie Johannes Theodorus Janse in 1932.
