= Acaenica =

Scientific classification
- Kingdom: Animalia
- Phylum: Arthropoda
- Class: Insecta
- Order: Lepidoptera
- Superfamily: Noctuoidea
- Family: Noctuidae
- Subfamily: Acontiinae
- Genus: Acaenica; Hampson, 1918
- Species: A. diaperas

Binomial name
- Acaenica diaperas Hampson, 1918

Genus of moths

Acaenica is a monotypic moth genus of the family Noctuidae. Its only species, Acaenica diaperas, is found in Mozambique where the type specimen was found on Mount Chiperone. Both the genus and species were first described by George Hampson in 1918.
