= Chrysocatharylla agraphellus =

Scientific classification
- Kingdom: Animalia
- Phylum: Arthropoda
- Class: Insecta
- Order: Lepidoptera
- Family: Crambidae
- Subfamily: Crambinae
- Tribe: Calamotrophini
- Genus: Chrysocatharylla
- Species: C. agraphellus

Binomial name
- Chrysocatharylla agraphellus (Hampson, 1919)

Synonyms
- Crambus agraphellus Hampson, 1919; Chrysocatharylla fusca Bassi, 1999

Species of moth

Chrysocatharylla agraphellus is a moth in the family Crambidae. It was described by George Hampson in 1919. It is found in South Africa, Mozambique and on Aldabra atoll in the Seychelles.
