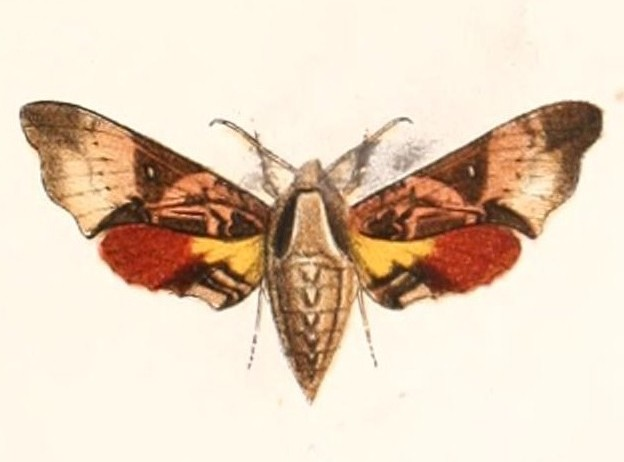

Scientific classification
- Domain: Eukaryota
- Kingdom: Animalia
- Phylum: Arthropoda
- Class: Insecta
- Order: Lepidoptera
- Family: Sphingidae
- Genus: Odontosida
- Species: O. magnificum

Binomial name
- Odontosida magnificum (Rothschild, 1894)

Synonyms
- Lophuron magnificum Rothschild, 1894

= Odontosida magnificum =

Species of moth

Odontosida magnificum is a moth of the family Sphingidae. It is known from South Africa and Zimbabwe.
