= Eilema bifasciata =

Scientific classification
- Kingdom: Animalia
- Phylum: Arthropoda
- Class: Insecta
- Order: Lepidoptera
- Superfamily: Noctuoidea
- Family: Erebidae
- Subfamily: Arctiinae
- Genus: Eilema
- Species: E. bifasciata

Binomial name
- Eilema bifasciata Hampson, 1900

Species of moth

Eilema bifasciata is a moth of the subfamily Arctiinae. It is found in the Democratic Republic of Congo, Mozambique and South Africa.
