= Crinipus vassei =

Scientific classification
- Domain: Eukaryota
- Kingdom: Animalia
- Phylum: Arthropoda
- Class: Insecta
- Order: Lepidoptera
- Family: Sesiidae
- Genus: Crinipus
- Species: C. vassei

Binomial name
- Crinipus vassei (Le Cerf, 1917)

Synonyms
- Aegeria vassei Le Cerf, 1917; Synanthedon vassei

Species of moth

Crinipus vassei is a moth of the family Sesiidae. It is found in Mozambique.
