= Epichilo obscurefasciellus =

Scientific classification
- Kingdom: Animalia
- Phylum: Arthropoda
- Clade: Pancrustacea
- Class: Insecta
- Order: Lepidoptera
- Family: Crambidae
- Subfamily: Crambinae
- Tribe: Crambini
- Genus: Epichilo
- Species: E. obscurefasciellus

Binomial name
- Epichilo obscurefasciellus (de Joannis, 1927)

Synonyms
- Crambus obscurefasciellus de Joannis, 1927; Crambus obscurefaciellus Błeszyński & Collins, 1962

Species of moth

Epichilo obscurefasciellus is a moth in the family Crambidae. It was described by Joseph de Joannis in 1927. It is found in Mozambique.
