= Vespanthedon =

Scientific classification
- Kingdom: Animalia
- Phylum: Arthropoda
- Class: Insecta
- Order: Lepidoptera
- Family: Sesiidae
- Genus: Vespanthedon; Le Cerf, 1917

Genus of moths

Vespanthedon is a genus of moths in the family Sesiidae. It contains the species Vespanthedon cerceris, which is known from Mozambique, and Vespanthedon chalciphora.
