= Dichomeris monococca =

Scientific classification
- Kingdom: Animalia
- Phylum: Arthropoda
- Class: Insecta
- Order: Lepidoptera
- Family: Gelechiidae
- Genus: Dichomeris
- Species: D. monococca

Binomial name
- Dichomeris monococca (Meyrick, 1921)

Synonyms
- Trichotaphe monococca Meyrick, 1921

Species of moth

Dichomeris monococca is a moth in the family Gelechiidae. It was described by Edward Meyrick in 1921. It is found in Mozambique.

The wingspan is about 14 millimetres (0.55 in). The forewings are rather dark purplish grey with some scattered blackish scales between the veins and a cloudy blackish dot in the disc at one-fourth. There is a small oval whitish spot in the disc before the middle, edged anteriorly with blackish and followed by a blackish elongate blotch. The plical stigma is cloudy, blackish and nearly beneath the whitish spot. There is a cloudy whitish dot on the costa at three-fourths. The hindwings are grey.
