= Eilema phaeopera =

Scientific classification
- Kingdom: Animalia
- Phylum: Arthropoda
- Class: Insecta
- Order: Lepidoptera
- Superfamily: Noctuoidea
- Family: Erebidae
- Subfamily: Arctiinae
- Genus: Eilema
- Species: E. phaeopera

Binomial name
- Eilema phaeopera (Hampson, 1900)

Synonyms
- Ilema phaeopera Hampson, 1900; Eubaphilema phaeopera (Hampson, 1900)

Species of moth

Eilema phaeopera is a moth of the subfamily Arctiinae. It was described by George Hampson in 1900. It is found in Mozambique and South Africa.
