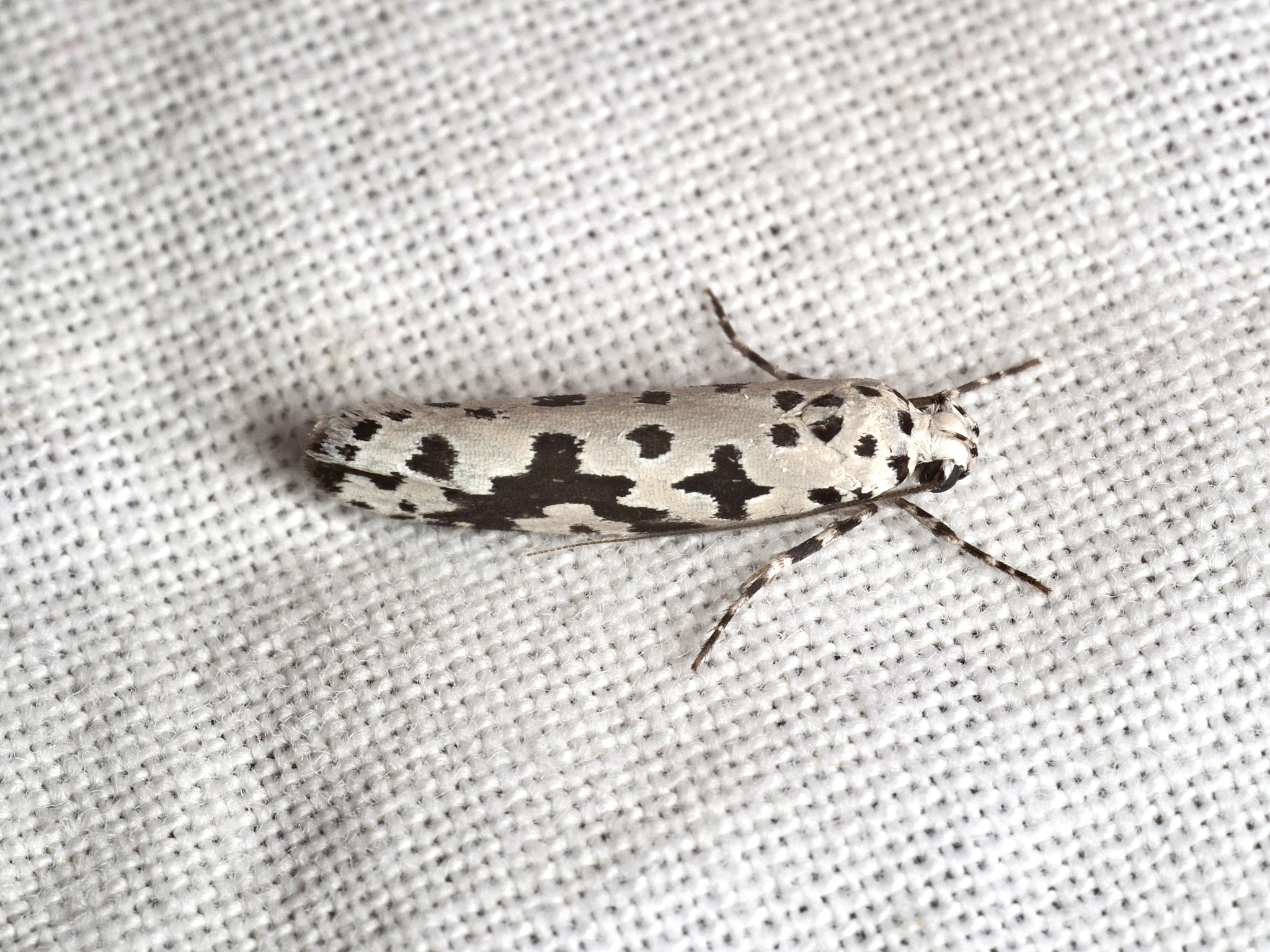

Scientific classification
- Domain: Eukaryota
- Kingdom: Animalia
- Phylum: Arthropoda
- Class: Insecta
- Order: Lepidoptera
- Family: Depressariidae
- Genus: Ethmia
- Species: E. sabiella

Binomial name
- Ethmia sabiella (Felder & Rogenhofer, 1875)

Synonyms
- Psecadia sabiella Felder & Rogenhofer, 1875

= Ethmia sabiella =

Species of moth

Ethmia sabiella is a moth in the family Depressariidae. It is found in Mozambique and South Africa.
