= Tricerophora commaculata =

Scientific classification
- Kingdom: Animalia
- Phylum: Arthropoda
- Class: Insecta
- Order: Lepidoptera
- Family: Gelechiidae
- Genus: Tricerophora
- Species: T. commaculata

Binomial name
- Tricerophora commaculata (Meyrick, 1921)

Synonyms
- Telphusa commaculata Meyrick, 1921

Species of moth

Tricerophora commaculata is a moth in the family Gelechiidae first described by Edward Meyrick in 1921. It is found in Mozambique, South Africa and Zimbabwe.

The wingspan is 15–16 mm. The forewings are white irregularly speckled with blackish and with a very oblique wedge-shaped black blotch on the base of the costa, as well as a thick black longitudinal streak from the base of the dorsum to beneath the middle of the disc, and a black streak from above the apex of this to the termen above the middle, gradually considerably expanded above with black suffusion to reach the costa before the apex, these two comprehended in a broader irregular streak of grey suffusion, and crossed by direct transverse fasciae of grey suffusion before the middle and at three-fourths, the former including a strong black subcostal streak. The hindwings are grey, suffused with dark grey posteriorly and with some scattered raised whitish and two or three blackish scales on the veins anteriorly.
