= Aenigmina tiresa =

Scientific classification
- Domain: Eukaryota
- Kingdom: Animalia
- Phylum: Arthropoda
- Class: Insecta
- Order: Lepidoptera
- Family: Sesiidae
- Genus: Aenigmina
- Species: A. tiresa

Binomial name
- Aenigmina tiresa (H. Druce, 1899)

Synonyms
- Aegeria tiresa H. Druce, 1899; Chamanthedon tiresa

Species of moth

Aenigmina tiresa is a moth of the family Sesiidae. It is known from Mozambique.
