= Apotactis drimylota =

Scientific classification
- Domain: Eukaryota
- Kingdom: Animalia
- Phylum: Arthropoda
- Class: Insecta
- Order: Lepidoptera
- Family: Gelechiidae
- Genus: Apotactis
- Species: A. drimylota

Binomial name
- Apotactis drimylota Meyrick, 1918

Species of moth

Apotactis drimylota is a species of moth in the family Gelechiidae. It was described by Edward Meyrick in 1918. It is found in Mozambique.

The wingspan is 14–16 mm. The forewings are grey, variably irrorated (speckled) with white, with a few black scales and small elongate blackish spots on the costa at one-fifth, one-third and the middle. There are black elongate dots beneath the costa near the base, and on the fold at one-fourth, and sometimes a smaller one beyond the former of these. The stigmata are rather large, elongate and black, the plical slightly before the first discal. There are two or three short black dashes towards the costa posteriorly, and one above the tornus, as well as some cloudy blackish dots on the posterior part of the costa and termen. The hindwings are grey, slenderly hyaline (glassy) beneath the cell towards the base.
