= Chrysocatharylla oenescentellus =

Scientific classification
- Kingdom: Animalia
- Phylum: Arthropoda
- Class: Insecta
- Order: Lepidoptera
- Family: Crambidae
- Subfamily: Crambinae
- Tribe: Calamotrophini
- Genus: Chrysocatharylla
- Species: C. oenescentellus

Binomial name
- Chrysocatharylla oenescentellus (Hampson, 1896)

Synonyms
- Crambus oenescentellus Hampson, 1896; Crambus aenescentellus Hampson, 1896

Species of moth

Chrysocatharylla oenescentellus is a moth in the family Crambidae. It was described by George Hampson in 1896. It is found in Kenya, Mozambique, South Africa and India.
