= Aenigmina critheis =

Scientific classification
- Kingdom: Animalia
- Phylum: Arthropoda
- Clade: Pancrustacea
- Class: Insecta
- Order: Lepidoptera
- Family: Sesiidae
- Genus: Aenigmina
- Species: A. critheis

Binomial name
- Aenigmina critheis (H. Druce, 1899)

Synonyms
- Aegeria critheis H. Druce, 1899; Chamanthedon critheis

Species of moth

Aenigmina critheis is a moth of the family Sesiidae. It is known from Mozambique.
