= Scythris concurrens =

Scientific classification
- Kingdom: Animalia
- Phylum: Arthropoda
- Class: Insecta
- Order: Lepidoptera
- Family: Scythrididae
- Genus: Scythris
- Species: S. concurrens

Binomial name
- Scythris concurrens Meyrick, 1921

Species of moth

Scythris concurrens is a moth of the family Scythrididae. It was described by Edward Meyrick in 1921. It is found in Mozambique and Kenya.

The wingspan is about 10 mm. The forewings are fuscous-grey with a suffused white streak along the costa from the base to near the apex, with suffused whitish lines along the veins running into it. There is an irregular suffused white streak from the base along the fold throughout, and then along the termen to the apex. The dorsal area beneath this is mostly suffused with whitish anteriorly, and posteriorly with a defined whitish line along vein 1b. The plical and second discal stigmata are indicated as cloudy round grey spots indenting the lower and upper margins of the plical streak respectively. The hindwings are grey.
