= Audeoudia grisella =

Scientific classification
- Domain: Eukaryota
- Kingdom: Animalia
- Phylum: Arthropoda
- Class: Insecta
- Order: Lepidoptera
- Family: Pyralidae
- Genus: Audeoudia
- Species: A. grisella

Binomial name
- Audeoudia grisella de Joannis, 1927

Species of moth

Audeoudia grisella is a species of snout moth in the genus Audeoudia. It was described by Joseph de Joannis in 1927 and is known from Mozambique.
