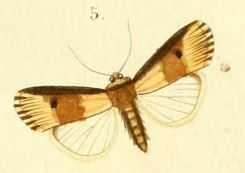

Scientific classification
- Kingdom: Animalia
- Phylum: Arthropoda
- Class: Insecta
- Order: Lepidoptera
- Superfamily: Noctuoidea
- Family: Noctuidae
- Genus: Amazonides
- Species: A. tabida

Binomial name
- Amazonides tabida (Guenée, 1852)

Synonyms
- Axylia tabida Guenée, 1852; Caradrina ferida Pagenstecher, 1893

= Amazonides tabida =

Species of moth

Amazonides tabida is a moth of the family Noctuidae. It is found in Mozambique and Senegal.
