= Asapharcha crateropa =

Scientific classification
- Kingdom: Animalia
- Phylum: Arthropoda
- Class: Insecta
- Order: Lepidoptera
- Family: Gelechiidae
- Genus: Asapharcha
- Species: A. crateropa

Binomial name
- Asapharcha crateropa Meyrick, 1930

Species of moth

Asapharcha crateropa is a species of moth in the family Gelechiidae. It was described by Edward Meyrick in 1930. It is found in Mozambique.

The wingspan is about 18 mm.
