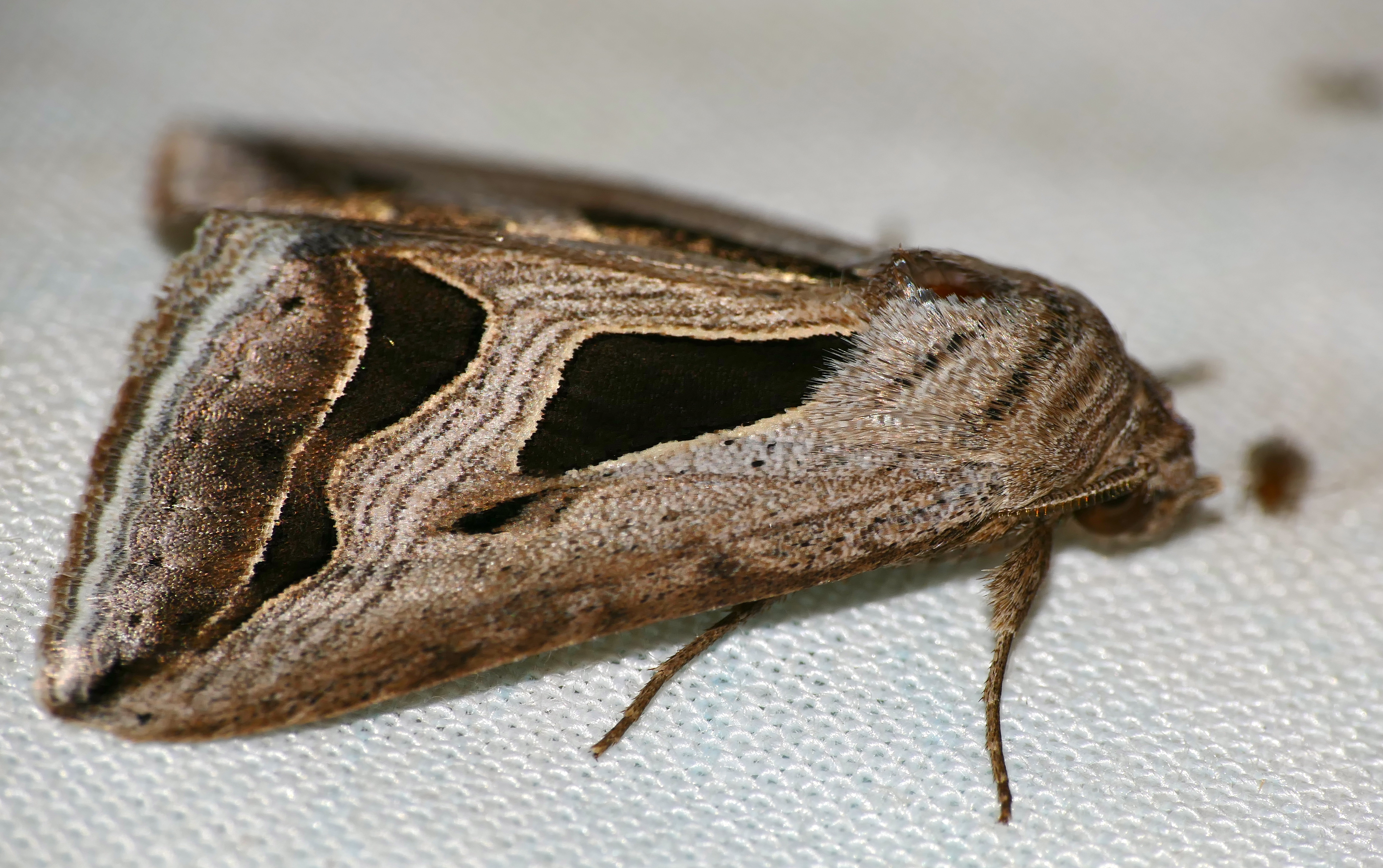

Scientific classification
- Kingdom: Animalia
- Phylum: Arthropoda
- Class: Insecta
- Order: Lepidoptera
- Superfamily: Noctuoidea
- Family: Noctuidae (?)
- Genus: Cuneisigna
- Species: C. obstans

Binomial name
- Cuneisigna obstans (Walker, 1858)

Synonyms
- Cuneisigna hemidelta (Mabille, 1890); Trigonodes obstans Walker, 1858; Trigonodes hemidelta Mabille, 1890

= Cuneisigna obstans =

Species of moth

Cuneisigna obstans is a moth of the family Noctuidae first described by Francis Walker in 1858. It is found in Mozambique and South Africa.
