= Eulophota pretoriella =

Scientific classification
- Domain: Eukaryota
- Kingdom: Animalia
- Phylum: Arthropoda
- Class: Insecta
- Order: Lepidoptera
- Family: Pyralidae
- Genus: Eulophota
- Species: E. pretoriella

Binomial name
- Eulophota pretoriella de Joannis, 1927

Species of moth

Eulophota pretoriella is a species of the snout moth in the genus Eulophota. It was described by Joseph de Joannis in 1927, and it is known from Mozambique.
