= Lysitona =

Scientific classification
- Kingdom: Animalia
- Phylum: Arthropoda
- Clade: Pancrustacea
- Class: Insecta
- Order: Lepidoptera
- Family: Tineidae
- Genus: Lysitona; Meyrick, 1918

Type species
- Lysitona euryacta Meyrick, 1918

Species
- L. euryacta Meyrick, 1918

Synonyms
- Genus: Isozyga Meyrick, 1921; Species: Isozyga phasganopa Meyrick, 1921

Genus of moths

Lysitona is a genus of moths belonging to the family Tineidae. As of 2018, it contains only one species, Lysitona euryacta, which is found in Mozambique.
