= Araeophylla spiladias =

Scientific classification
- Kingdom: Animalia
- Phylum: Arthropoda
- Class: Insecta
- Order: Lepidoptera
- Family: Gelechiidae
- Genus: Araeophylla
- Species: A. spiladias

Binomial name
- Araeophylla spiladias (Meyrick, 1921)

Synonyms
- Lecithocera spiladias Meyrick, 1921

Species of moth

Araeophylla spiladias is a species of moth in the family Gelechiidae. It was described by Edward Meyrick in 1921. It is found in Mozambique.

The wingspan is about 11 mm. The forewings are light ochreous yellow irregularly sprinkled with blackish and with the costal edge suffused with dark grey. The markings are grey irrorated (sprinkled) with blackish and there is a roundish spot beneath the costa near the base. The stigmata are represented by roundish spots, the plical more oval, beneath the first discal, the second discal absorbed in an irregular fascia running from four-fifths of the costa to three-fourths of the dorsum. There are some small marginal spots around the apex and termen. The hindwings are light grey.
