= Eulophota simplex =

Scientific classification
- Kingdom: Animalia
- Phylum: Arthropoda
- Class: Insecta
- Order: Lepidoptera
- Family: Pyralidae
- Genus: Eulophota
- Species: E. simplex

Binomial name
- Eulophota simplex de Joannis, 1927

Species of moth

Eulophota simplex is a species of snout moth in the genus Eulophota. It was described by Joseph de Joannis in 1927 and is known from Mozambique.
