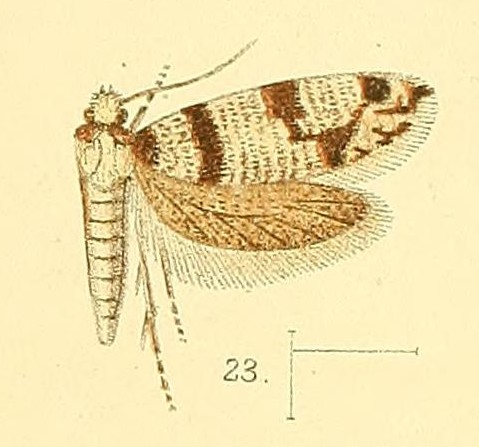

Scientific classification
- Kingdom: Animalia
- Phylum: Arthropoda
- Class: Insecta
- Order: Lepidoptera
- Family: Psychidae
- Genus: Barbaroscardia
- Species: B. fasciata

Binomial name
- Barbaroscardia fasciata Walsingham, 1891

= Barbaroscardia fasciata =

Species of moth

Barbaroscardia fasciata is a species of moths in the family Psychidae. It is only known from Mozambique (Delagoa bay).
