= Paurophleps reducta =

Scientific classification
- Kingdom: Animalia
- Phylum: Arthropoda
- Class: Insecta
- Order: Lepidoptera
- Superfamily: Noctuoidea
- Family: Erebidae
- Subfamily: Arctiinae
- Genus: Paurophleps
- Species: P. reducta

Binomial name
- Paurophleps reducta (Janse, 1964)

Synonyms
- Cycloptera reducta Janse, 1964

Species of moth

Paurophleps reducta is a moth in the subfamily Arctiinae. It is found in Mozambique.
