= Amata francisca =

Scientific classification
- Domain: Eukaryota
- Kingdom: Animalia
- Phylum: Arthropoda
- Class: Insecta
- Order: Lepidoptera
- Superfamily: Noctuoidea
- Family: Erebidae
- Subfamily: Arctiinae
- Genus: Amata
- Species: A. francisca

Binomial name
- Amata francisca (Butler, 1876)

Synonyms
- Syntomis francisca Butler, 1876; Syntomis curtiplaga Mabille, 1890

Species of moth

Amata francisca is a moth of the family Erebidae. It was described by Arthur Gardiner Butler in 1876. It is found in the Republic of the Congo, Mozambique and Sierra Leone.
