= Scythris clemens =

Scientific classification
- Kingdom: Animalia
- Phylum: Arthropoda
- Class: Insecta
- Order: Lepidoptera
- Family: Scythrididae
- Genus: Scythris
- Species: S. clemens

Binomial name
- Scythris clemens Meyrick, 1921

Species of moth

Scythris clemens is a moth of the family Scythrididae. It was described by Edward Meyrick in 1921. It is found in Mozambique and South Africa (Gauteng).

The wingspan is about 15 mm. The forewings are fuscous with a rather broad suffused pale ochreous-yellowish median streak from the base to the apex, suffused into the costa towards the apex. The hindwings are rather dark grey.
