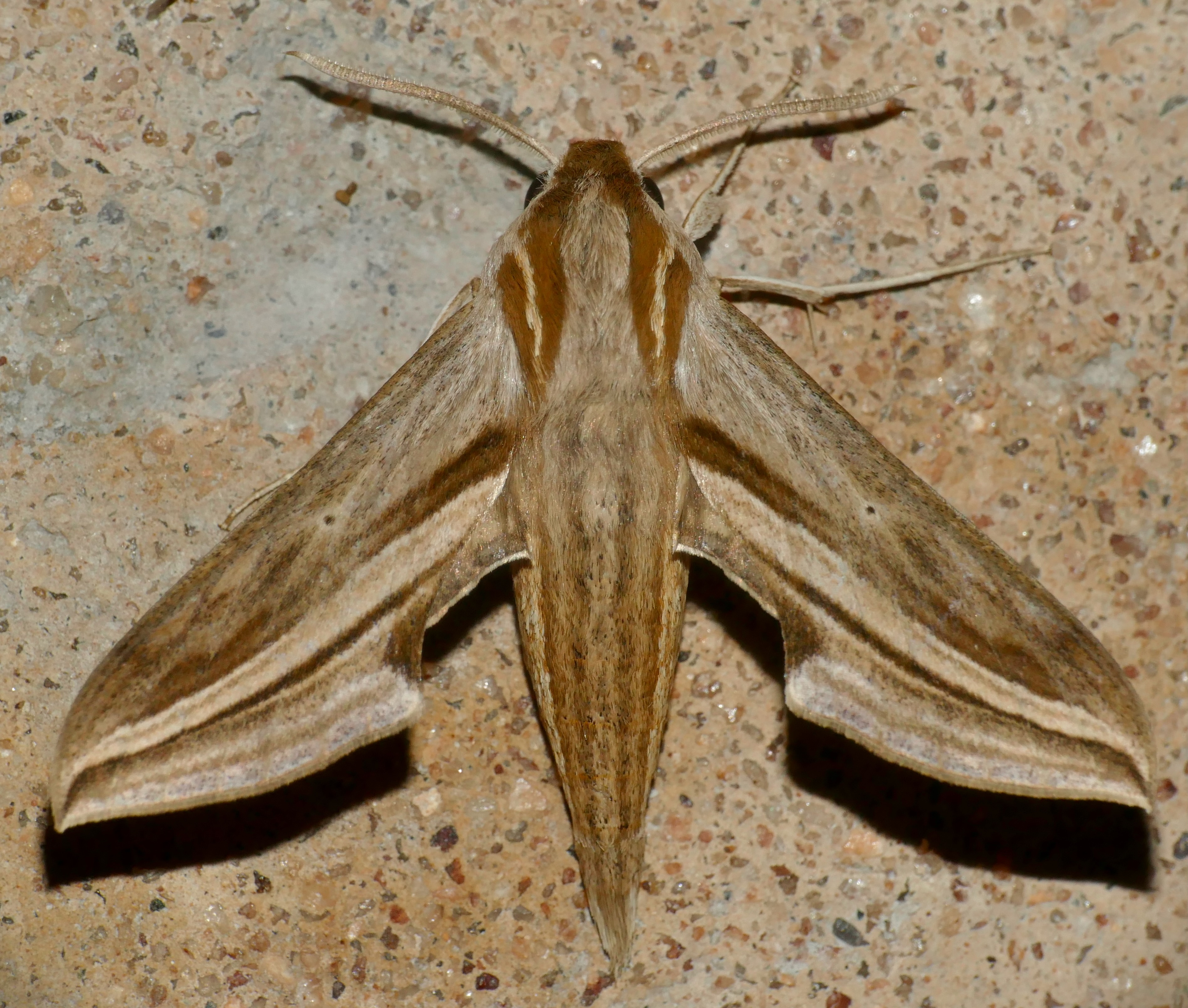

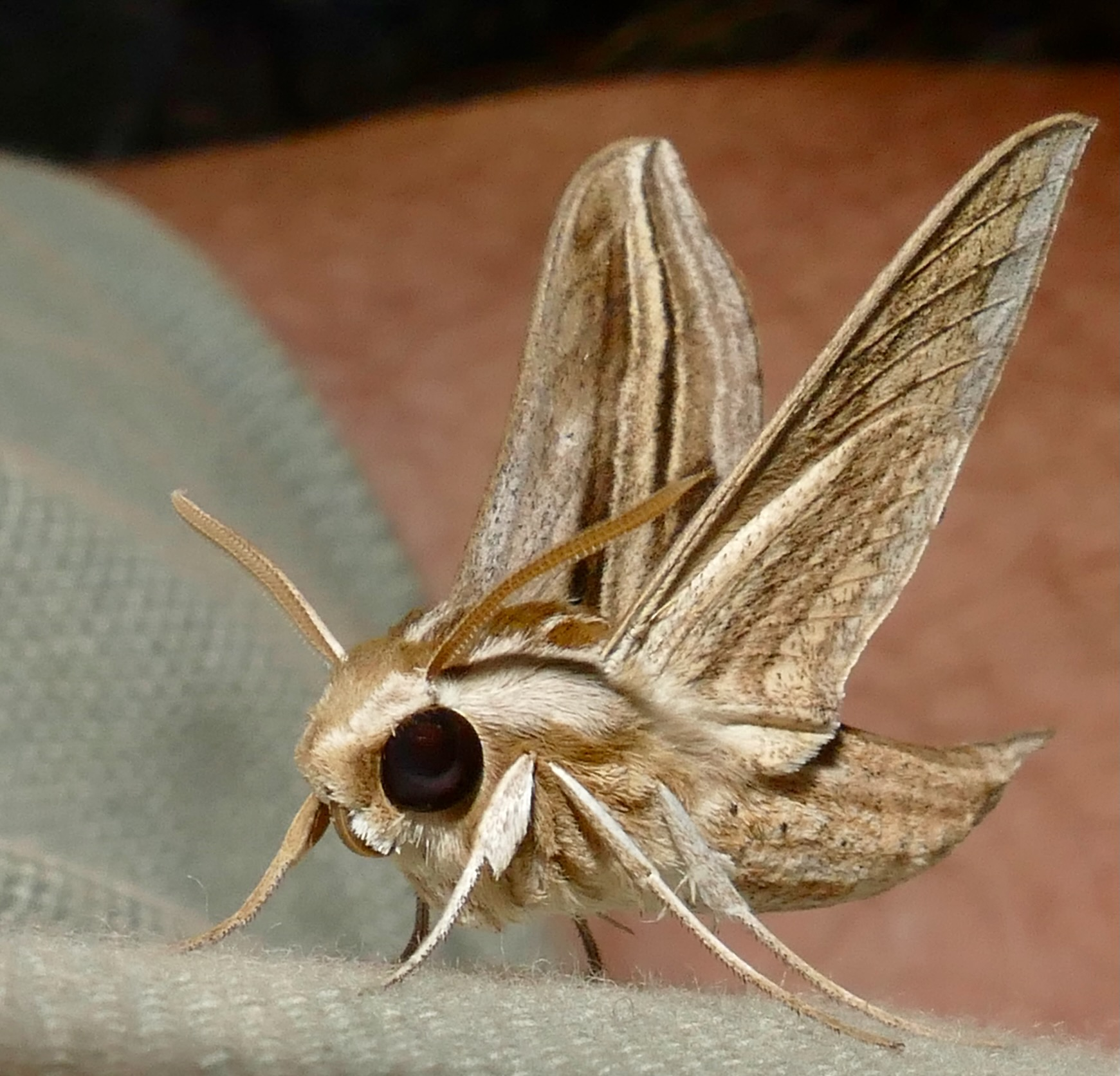

Scientific classification
- Kingdom: Animalia
- Phylum: Arthropoda
- Class: Insecta
- Order: Lepidoptera
- Family: Sphingidae
- Genus: Theretra
- Species: T. monteironis

Binomial name
- Theretra monteironis (Butler, 1882)

Synonyms
- Chaerocampa monteironis Butler, 1882; Theretra cajus ugandae Clark, 1923

= Theretra monteironis =

Species of moth

Theretra monteironis is a moth of the family Sphingidae. It is known from dry habitats from KwaZulu-Natal to eastern Kenya.

The length of the forewings is 20–23 mm and the wingspan is 48–62 mm.

The larvae feed on the leaves of Zantedeschia aethiopica.
