= List of moths of Australia (Sesiidae) =

Partial list of Australian moths

This is a list of the Australian moth species of the family Sesiidae. It also acts as an index to the species articles and forms part of the full List of moths of Australia.

== Sesiinae ==
- Carmenta mimosa Eichlin & Passoa, 1984
- Chamaesphecia mysiniformis (Boisduval, 1840)
- Ichneumenoptera chrysophanes (Meyrick, 1886)
- Ichneumenoptera commoni (Duckworth & Eichlin, 1974)
- Ichneumenoptera xanthogyna (Hampson, 1919)
- Melittia chalybescens Miskin, 1892
- Melittia doddi Le Cerf, 1916
- Nokona carulifera (Hampson, 1919)
- Nokona coracodes (Turner 1922)
- Pseudosesia isozona (Meyrick, 1886)
- Pseudosesia oberthuri (Le Cerf, 1916)
- Pseudosesia zoniota (Turner, 1922)
- Pyropteron doryliformis (Ochsenheimer, 1808)
- Synanthedon cupreifascia (Miskin, 1892)
- Synanthedon tipuliformis (Clerck, 1759)
- Trilochana smaragdina Diakonoff, 1954

== Tinthiinae ==
- Oligophlebia eusphyra (Turner, 1917)
- Oligophlebia igniflua (T.P. Lucas, 1893)
- Tinthia xanthospila Hampson, 1919
