= Melittia congoana =

Scientific classification
- Domain: Eukaryota
- Kingdom: Animalia
- Phylum: Arthropoda
- Class: Insecta
- Order: Lepidoptera
- Family: Sesiidae
- Genus: Melittia
- Species: M. congoana

Binomial name
- Melittia congoana Le Cerf, 1916

Species of moth

Melittia congoana is a moth of the family Sesiidae. It is known from the Democratic Republic of the Congo.
