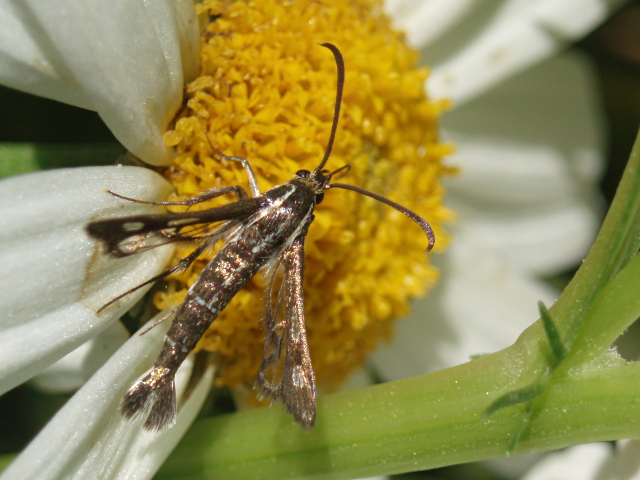

Scientific classification
- Kingdom: Animalia
- Phylum: Arthropoda
- Clade: Pancrustacea
- Class: Insecta
- Order: Lepidoptera
- Family: Sesiidae
- Genus: Pyropteron
- Subgenus: Synansphecia
- Species: P. muscaeforme

Binomial name
- Pyropteron muscaeforme (Esper, 1783)

Synonyms
- Sphinx muscaeforme Esper, 1783; Pyropteron muscaeformis; Synansphecia muscaeforme; Sesia philanthiformis Laspeyres, 1801; Chamaesphecia aestivata Králícek, 1969; Sesia occidentale de Joannis, 1908

= Pyropteron muscaeforme =

Species of moth

Pyropteron muscaeforme, the thrift clearwing, is a moth of the family Sesiidae that lives in most of Europe.

== Ecology ==
A small member of its genus, the wingspan is 15–18 mm. It is further distinguished by narrow clear (transparent) spaces on the blackish, or bronzy, forewings. There are three whitish bands on the body, and traces of a whitish line along the middle of the back. Adults can be found on the flowers of the host plant, as well as on thyme (Thymus vulgaris). Males are attracted to pheromone lures. It is found on exposed rocky areas where its larval food plant occurs and overwinters as a larva.

Ovum

Eggs are ovoid, are black with white retriculations and are laid on thrift (Armeria maritima). They can only be seen under magnification, as they are only c. 0.7 mm on the longest axis.

Larva

Larvae are 11-15 mm long. They have a yellowish-white body, reddish-brown head and the prothorax is pale brown. They feed from August to May on the roots and stem in a silk-lined tunnel. In late summer and autumn, piles of reddish-frass can be seen extruding from infected stems. Plants with larvae are often on the edge of large patches of thrift. Larvae of Lobesia littoralis feed in the flowers, shoots and leaves in the spring and seeds in the autumn.

Pupa

The pupa is slender and tapering, 12–14 mm long and is light reddish-brown with darker brown eyes, thorax and wings. It does not pupate in a cocoon.

=== Subspecies ===
- Pyropteron muscaeforme muscaeforme
- Pyropteron muscaeforme occidentale (de Joannis, 1908)
- Pyropteron muscaeforme lusohispanicum Lastuvka & Lastuvka, 2007

== Gallery ==
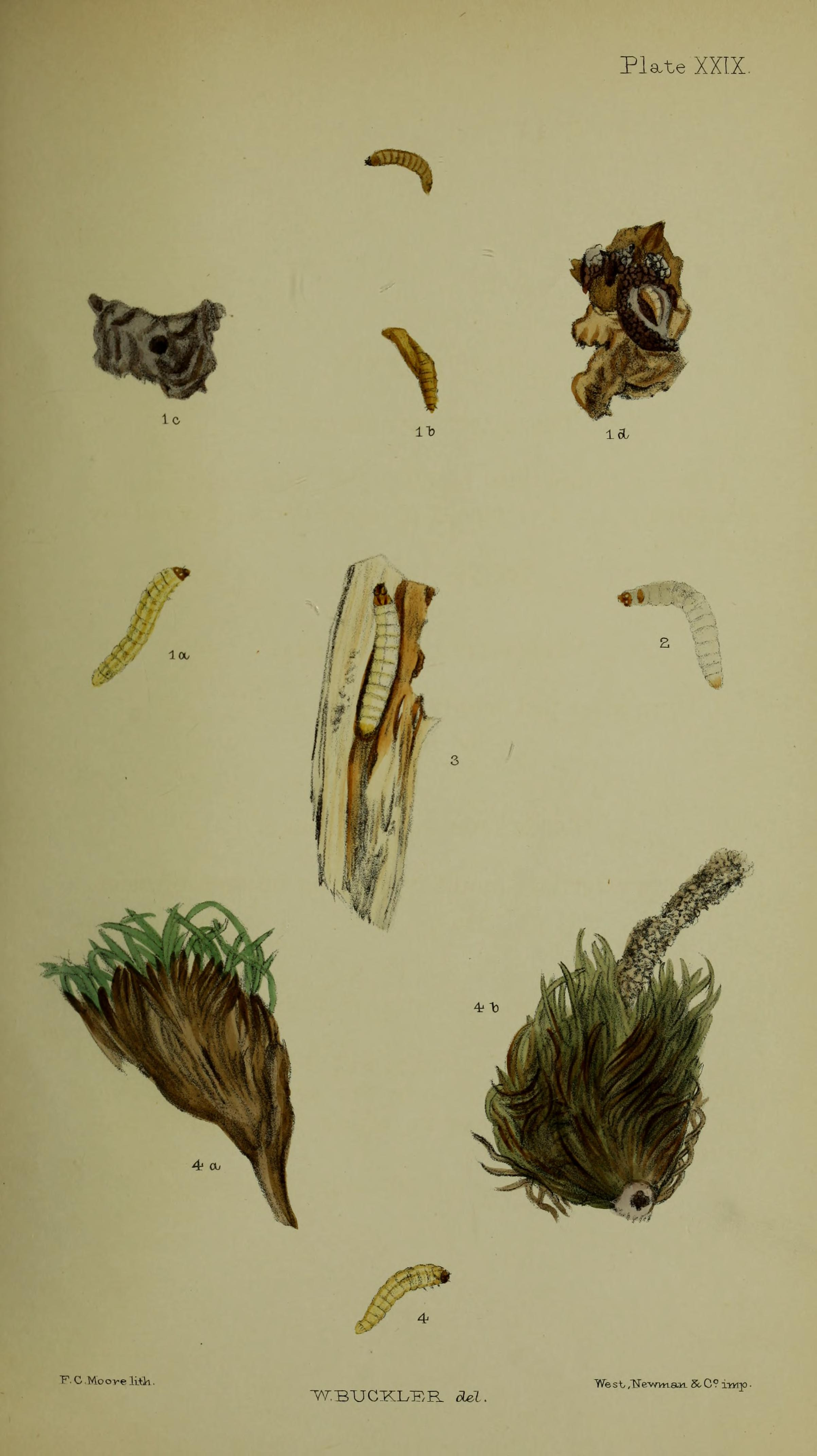
Figs, 4 larva after last moult 4a, 4b tufts of thrift (Statice armeria) burrowed by the larva 4b showing the long tubular gallery in which the pupa is contained

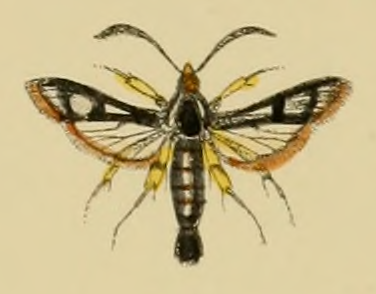

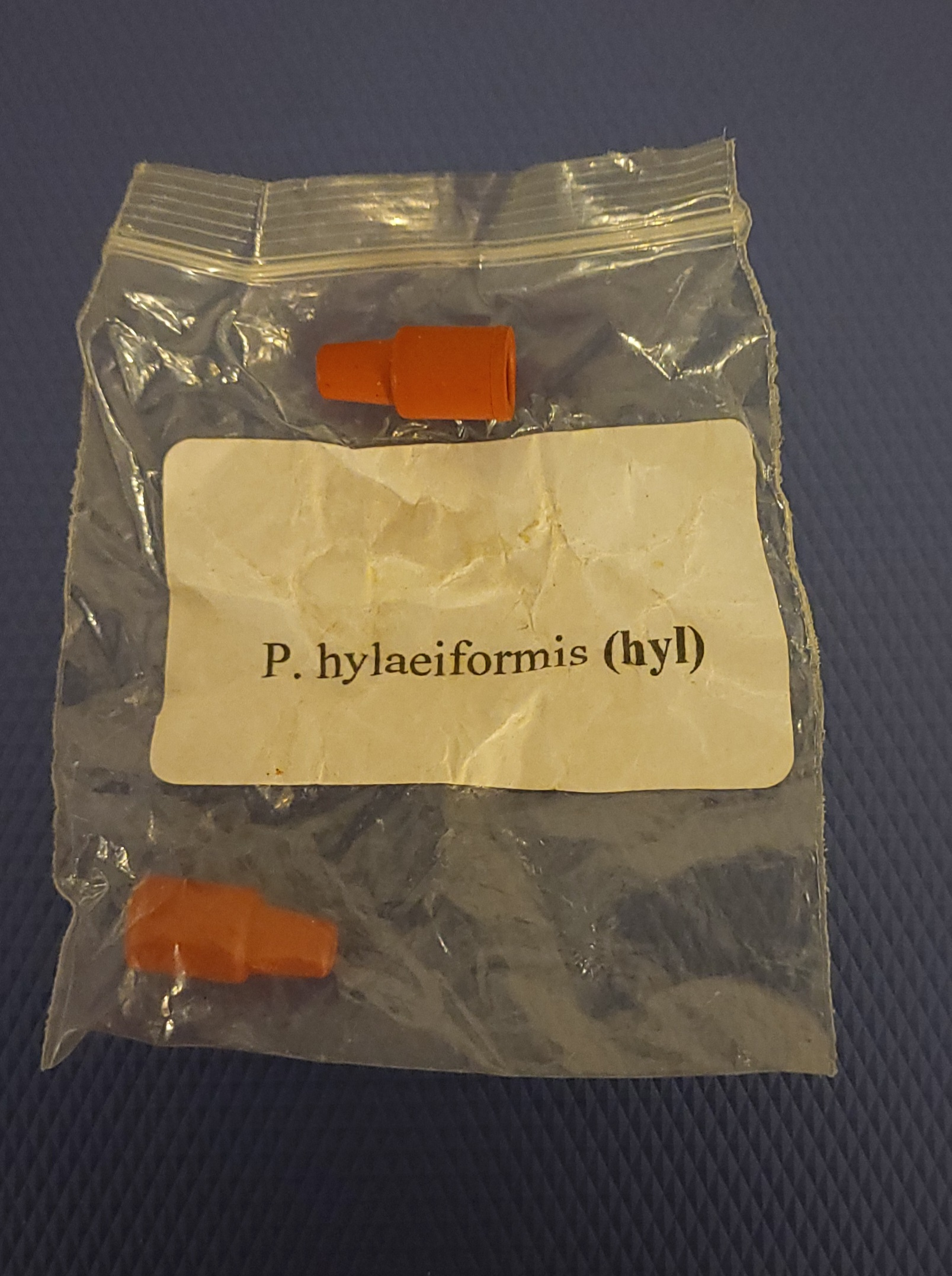
Hyl pheromone for attracting male thrift clearwing

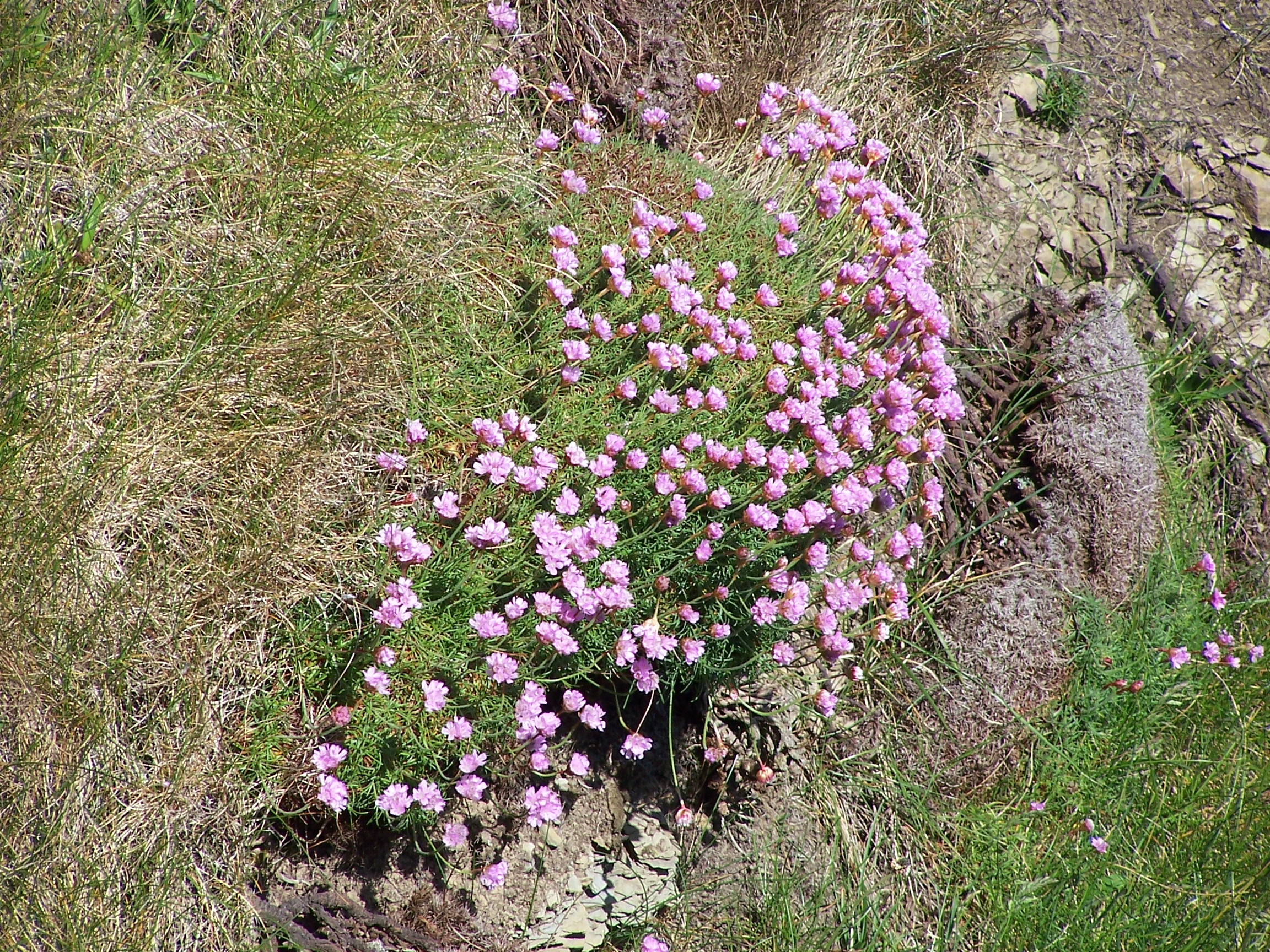
Larval foodplant. Thrift (Armeria maritima)

== Taxonomy ==
Originally named Sphinx muscaeforme by the German zoologist Eugen Johann Christoph Esper in 1783, the genus was erected by Carl Linnaeus in his 1758 10th edition of Systema Naturae. Sphinx refers to the monument of the same name, near the great pyramid in Egypt, which has the body of a lion and the bust of a woman. Linnaeus may have seen a similarity between the raised head of the statue and a larva with its head raised, although there is no evidence that the generic names Linnaeus chose, had any direct application to the insects in the genus. The present genus Pyropteron was raised by the English entomologist Edward Newman in 1832. The specific name muscaeforme means in the form of a fly.
