= Melittia endoxantha =

Scientific classification
- Kingdom: Animalia
- Phylum: Arthropoda
- Class: Insecta
- Order: Lepidoptera
- Family: Sesiidae
- Genus: Melittia
- Species: M. endoxantha

Binomial name
- Melittia endoxantha Hampson, 1919

Species of moth

Melittia endoxantha is a moth of the family Sesiidae. It is known from Mozambique and Tanzania.
