= Melittia xanthogaster =

Scientific classification
- Kingdom: Animalia
- Phylum: Arthropoda
- Class: Insecta
- Order: Lepidoptera
- Family: Sesiidae
- Genus: Melittia
- Species: M. xanthogaster

Binomial name
- Melittia xanthogaster Hampson, 1919

Species of moth

Melittia xanthogaster is a moth of the family Sesiidae. It is known from Kenya.
