= Pyropteron kautzi =

Scientific classification
- Domain: Eukaryota
- Kingdom: Animalia
- Phylum: Arthropoda
- Class: Insecta
- Order: Lepidoptera
- Family: Sesiidae
- Genus: Pyropteron
- Subgenus: Synansphecia
- Species: P. kautzi

Binomial name
- Pyropteron kautzi (Reisser, 1930)

Synonyms
- Chamaesphecia kautzi Reisser, 1930; Synansphecia kautzi

Species of moth

Pyropteron kautzi is a moth of the family Sesiidae. It is found in Spain.

The larvae possibly feed on Thymus, Sideritis and/or Arenaria species.
