= Ichneumenoptera =

Scientific classification
- Kingdom: Animalia
- Phylum: Arthropoda
- Class: Insecta
- Order: Lepidoptera
- Family: Sesiidae
- Tribe: Synanthedonini
- Genus: Ichneumenoptera; Hampson, [1893]

Species
- See text

Genus of moths

Ichneumenoptera is a genus of moths in the family Sesiidae.

== Species ==
- Ichneumenoptera auripes (Hampson, [1893])
- Ichneumenoptera caudata Gorbunov & Arita, 1995
- Ichneumenoptera daidai Gorbunov & Arita, 2000
- Ichneumenoptera duporti (Le Cerf, 1927)
- Ichneumenoptera punicea Gorbunov & Arita, 2000
- Ichneumenoptera vietnamica Gorbunov & Arita, 1995
- Ichneumenoptera chrysophanes (Meyrick, 1887)
- Ichneumenoptera commoni (Duckworth & Eichlin, 1974)
- Ichneumenoptera xanthogyna (Hampson, 1919)
- Ichneumenoptera cinnamomumi (Tosevski, 2005)
