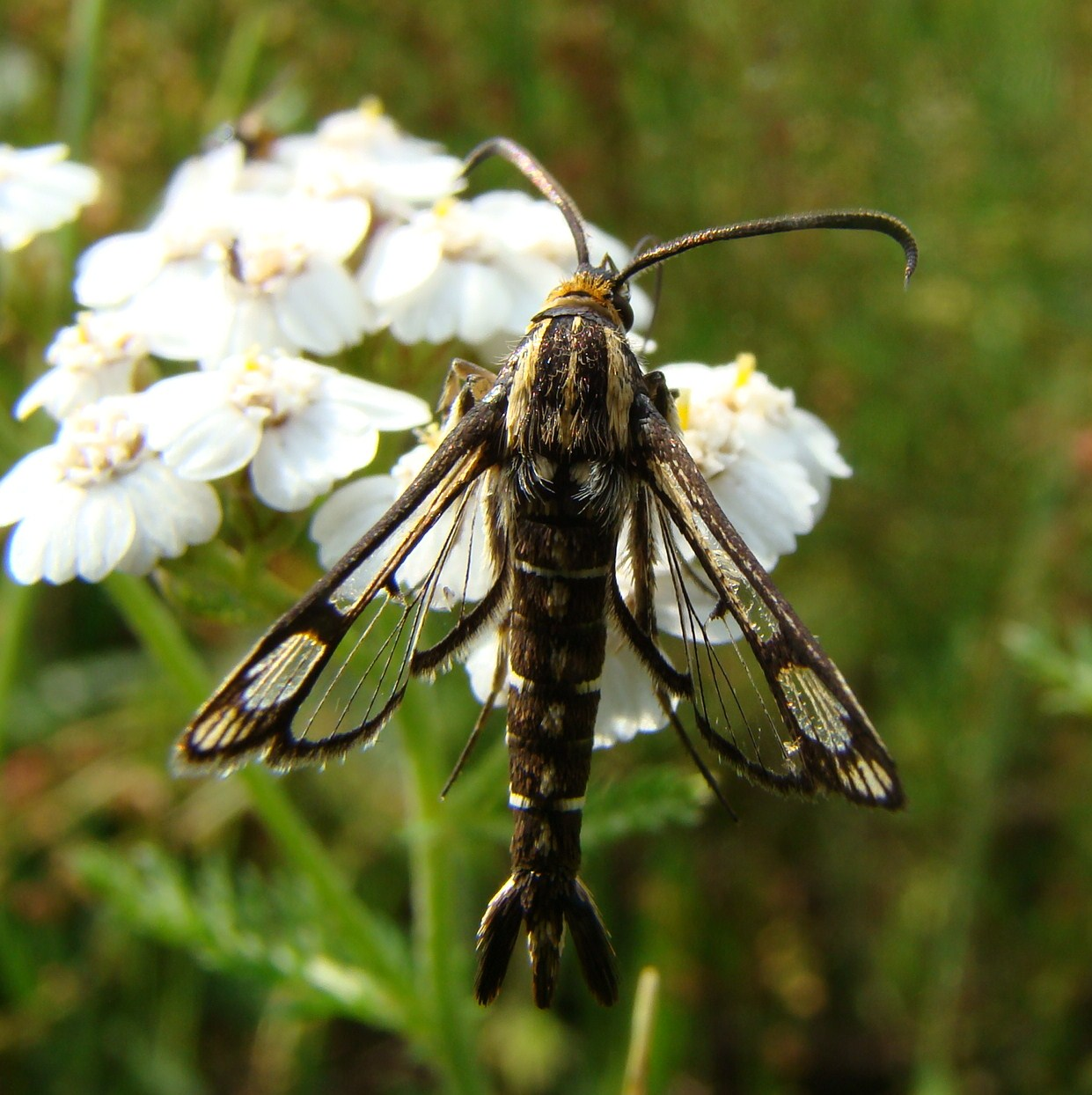

Scientific classification
- Domain: Eukaryota
- Kingdom: Animalia
- Phylum: Arthropoda
- Class: Insecta
- Order: Lepidoptera
- Family: Sesiidae
- Genus: Pyropteron
- Species: P. triannuliformis

Binomial name
- Pyropteron triannuliformis (Freyer, 1843) Synonyms: Sesia triannuliformis Freyer, 1843; Synansphecia triannuliformis; Pyropteron triannuliforme; Sesia braconiformis Herrich-Schäffer, 1846; Sesia armeniaca Bartel, 1906; Chamaesphecia balcanica Zukowsky, 1929; Bembecia ljiljanae Toševski, 1986; Pyropteron pungeleri Špatenka, 1987; Chamaesphecia rangnowi Zukowsky, 1929; Sesia meriaeformis Assmann, 1845 (nec Boisduval, 1840); Sesia philanthiformis Lederer, 1853 (nec Laspeyres, 1801)

= Pyropteron triannuliformis =

Species of moth

Pyropteron triannuliformis is a moth of the family Sesiidae. It is found from most of Europe (except Ireland, Great Britain, the Iberian Peninsula, the Benelux, Denmark and Fennoscandia) to the Near East and Central Asia.

The wingspan is 14–20 mm. Adults are on wing in June and July.

The larvae feed on the roots of Rumex species (including Rumex acetosella, Rumex acetosa, Rumex crispus, Rumex palustris and Rumex conglomeratus) as well as Geranium sanguineum.
