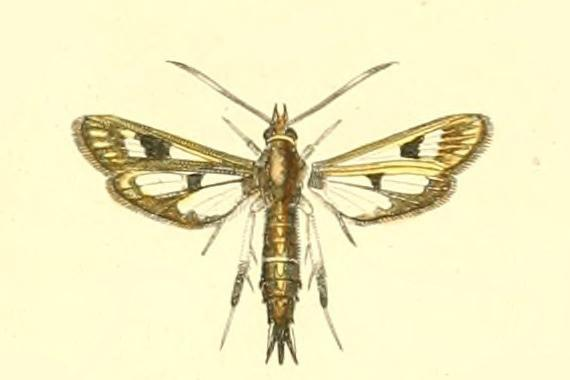

Scientific classification
- Kingdom: Animalia
- Phylum: Arthropoda
- Clade: Pancrustacea
- Class: Insecta
- Order: Lepidoptera
- Family: Sesiidae
- Genus: Pyropteron
- Subgenus: Synansphecia
- Species: P. umbrifera

Binomial name
- Pyropteron umbrifera (Staudinger, 1870)

Synonyms
- Sesia umbrifera Staudinger, 1870; Synansphecia umbrifera; Pyropteron umbriferum

= Pyropteron umbrifera =

Species of moth

Pyropteron umbrifera is a moth of the family Sesiidae. It is found in Greece.

The wingspan is 20–24 mm.

The larvae feed on Limonium sinuatum.
