= Nokona =

Scientific classification
- Domain: Eukaryota
- Kingdom: Animalia
- Phylum: Arthropoda
- Class: Insecta
- Order: Lepidoptera
- Family: Sesiidae
- Tribe: Paranthrenini
- Genus: Nokona; Matsumura 1931

Species
- See text

Genus of moths

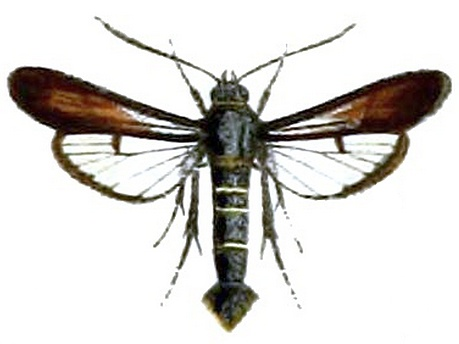
Nokona pernix

Nokona is a genus of moths in the family Sesiidae.

== Species ==
- Subgenus Nokona Matsumura, 1931
  - Nokona aurivena (Bryk, 1947)
  - Nokona bicincta (Walker, [1865])
  - Nokona chinensis (Leech, 1889b)
  - Nokona coreana Toševski & Arita, 1993
  - Nokona feralis (Leech, 1889)
  - Nokona iridina (Bryk, 1947)
  - Nokona nigra Arita, Kimura & Owada, 2009
  - Nokona pompilus (Bryk, 1947)
  - Nokona purpurea (Yano, 1965)
  - Nokona regalis (Butler, 1878) (Grape worm)
  - Nokona acaudata Arita & Gorbunov, 2001
  - Nokona christineae Fischer, 2003
  - Nokona chrysoidea (Zukowsky, 1932)
  - Nokona davidi (Le Cerf, 1917)
  - Nokona formosana Arita & Gorbunov, 2001
  - Nokona heterodesma (Diakonoff, [1968])
  - Nokona inexpectata Arita & Gorbunov, 2001
  - Nokona palawana Kallies & Arita, 1998
  - Nokona pilamicola (Strand, [1916])
  - Nokona powondrae (Dalla Torre, 1925)
  - Nokona semidiaphana (Zukowsky, 1929)
  - Nokona sikkima (Moore, 1879)
  - Nokona stroehlei Fischer, 2002
  - Nokona carulifera (Hampson, 1919)
  - Nokona coracodes (Turner, 1922)
- Subgenus Aritasesia Nakamura, 2009
  - Nokona pernix (Leech, 1889)
  - Nokona rubra Arita & Toševski, 1992
