= Nokona carulifera =

Scientific classification
- Kingdom: Animalia
- Phylum: Arthropoda
- Class: Insecta
- Order: Lepidoptera
- Family: Sesiidae
- Genus: Nokona
- Species: N. carulifera

Binomial name
- Nokona carulifera (Hampson, 1919)

Synonyms
- Albuna carulifera (Hampson, 1919); Paranthrene carulifera Hampson, 1919; Paranthrene caerulifera

Species of moth

Nokona carulifera is a moth of the family Sesiidae. It is only known from Kuranda in Queensland, but probably occurs throughout the western coastal regions of Queensland.

The length of the forewings is about 11 mm for males and about 13 mm for females.

== Taxonomy ==
Nokona coracodes was placed as a synonym of Nokona carulifera, but was reinstated as a valid species in 2001.
