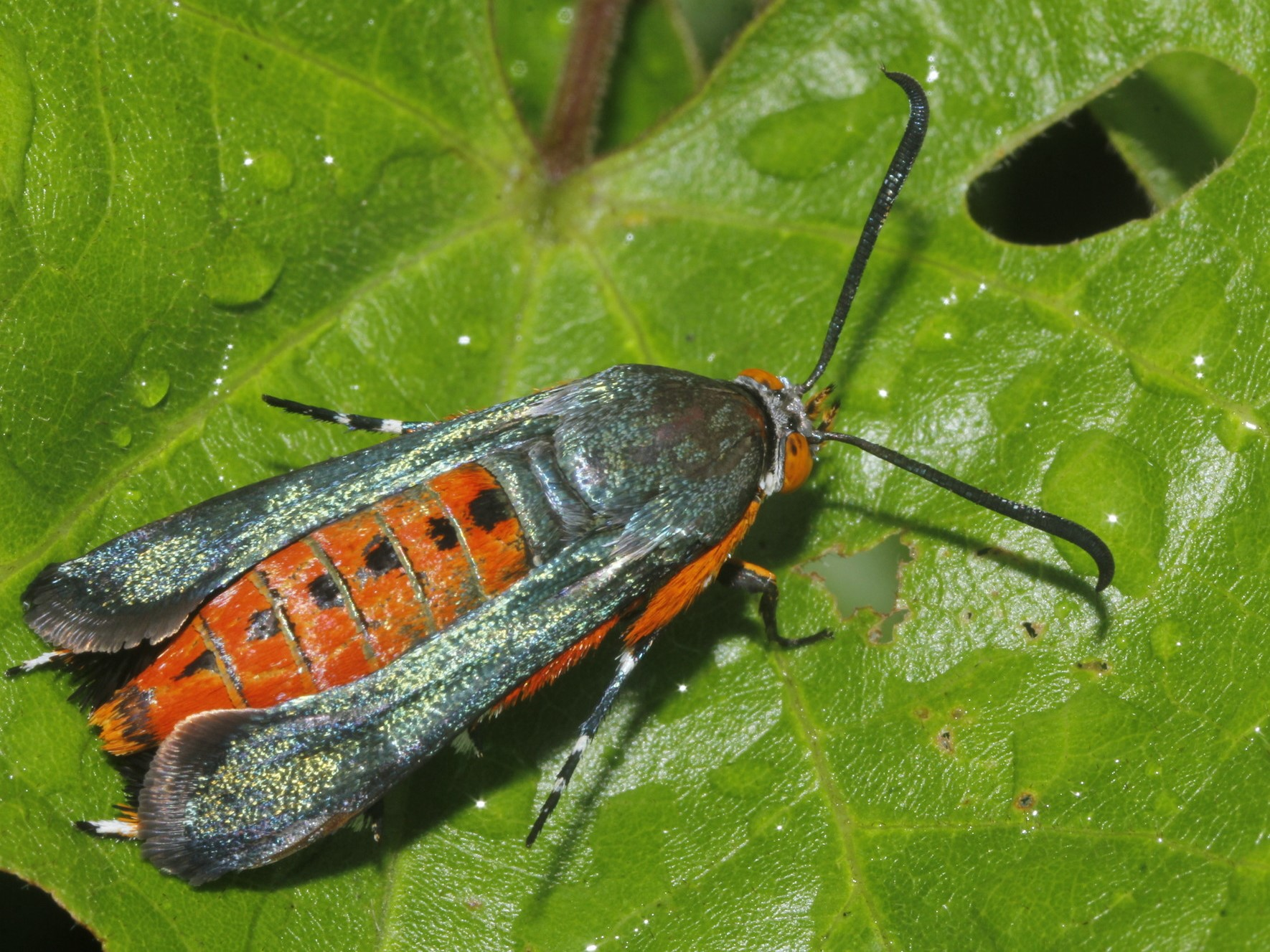
- Melittia calabaza

Scientific classification
- Kingdom: Animalia
- Phylum: Arthropoda
- Clade: Pancrustacea
- Class: Insecta
- Order: Lepidoptera
- Family: Sesiidae
- Subfamily: Sesiinae
- Tribe: Melittiini
- Genus: Melittia; Hübner, [1819]

Species
- See text

= Melittia =

Genus of moths

Melittia is a genus of moths in the family Sesiidae.

== Species ==
- Melittia abyssiniensis Hampson, 1919
- Melittia acosmetes Hampson, 1919
- Melittia afonini Gorbunov & Arita, 1999
- Melittia amboinensis Felder, 1861
- Melittia arcangelii Giacomelli, 1911
- Melittia astarte (Westwood, 1848)
- Melittia auriplumia Hampson, 1910
- Melittia aureosquamata (Wallengren, 1863)
- Melittia aurociliata (Aurivillius, 1879)
- Melittia azrael Le Cerf, 1914
- Melittia bella Arita & Gorbunov, 1996
- Melittia bergii Edwards, 1883
- Melittia binghami Niceville, 1900
- Melittia bombyliformis Cramer, 1782
- Melittia boulleti Le Cerf, 1917
- Melittia brabanti Le Cerf, 1917
- Melittia burmana Le Cerf, 1916b
- Melittia butleri Druce, 1883
- Melittia calabaza Duckworth & Eichlin, 1973
- Melittia callosoma Hampson, 1919
- Melittia celebica Le Cerf, 1916
- Melittia chalconota Hampson, 1910
- Melittia chalybescens Miskin, 1892
- Melittia chrysobapta Hampson, 1919
- Melittia chrysogaster Walker, [1865]
- Melittia chimana Le Cerf, 1916
- Melittia combusta (Le Cerf, 1916)
- Melittia congoana Le Cerf, 1916
- Melittia congruens Swinhoe, 1890
- Melittia cristata Arita & Gorbunov, 2002
- Melittia cucphuongae Arita & Gorbunov, 2000
- Melittia cucurbitae (Harris, 1828)
- Melittia cyaneifera Walker, 1856
- Melittia dichroipus Hampson, 1919
- Melittia distincta Le Cerf, 1916
- Melittia distinctoides Arita & Gorbunov, 2000
- Melittia doddi Le Cerf, 1916
- Melittia ectothyris Hampson, 1919
- Melittia eichlini Friedlander, 1986
- Melittia endoxantha Hampson, 1919
- Melittia erythrina Diakonoff, 1954
- Melittia eurytion (Westwood, 1848)
- Melittia faulkneri Eichlin, 1992
- Melittia ferroptera Kallies & Arita, 1998
- Melittia flaviventris Hampson, 1919
- Melittia formosana Matsumura, 1911
  - Melittia formosana formosana Matsumura, 1911
  - Melittia formosana nagaii Arita & Gorbunov, 1997
- Melittia fulvipes Kallies & Arita, 2004
- Melittia funesta Le Cerf, 1917
- Melittia gephyra Gaede, 1933
- Melittia gigantea Moore, 1879
- Melittia gilberti Eichlin, 1992
- Melittia gloriosa Edwards, 1880
- Melittia gorochovi Gorbunov, 1988a
- Melittia grandis (Strecker, 1881)
- Melittia haematopis Fawcett, 1916
- Melittia hampsoni Beutenmüller, 1894
- Melittia hervei Le Cerf, 1917
- Melittia houlberti Le Cerf, 1917
- Melittia hyaloxantha Meyrick, 1928
- Melittia imperator Rothschild, 1911
- Melittia inouei Arita & Yata, 1987
- Melittia indica Butler, 1874
- Melittia javana Le Cerf, 1916
- Melittia josepha Le Cerf, 1916
- Melittia khmer Le Cerf, 1917
- Melittia kulluana Moore, 1888
- Melittia laboissierei Le Cerf, 1917
- Melittia lagopus Boisduval, [1875]
- Melittia laniremis (Wallengren, 1859)
- Melittia latimargo Butler, 1874
- Melittia lentistriata Hampson, 1919
- Melittia leucogaster Hampson, 1919
- Melittia louisa Le Cerf, 1916
- Melittia luzonica Gorbunov & Arita, 1996
- Melittia madureae Le Cerf, 1916
- Melittia magnifica Beutenmüller, 1900
- Melittia meeki Le Cerf, 1916
- Melittia moluccaensis Hampson, 1919
- Melittia moni de Freina, 2007
- Melittia necopina Kallies & Arita, 2004
- Melittia nepalensis Gorbunov & Arita, 1999
- Melittia nepcha Moore, 1879
- Melittia newara Moore, 1879
- Melittia nigra (Le Cerf, 1917)
- Melittia nilgiriensis Gorbunov & Arita, 1999b
- Melittia notabilis Swinhoe, 1890
- Melittia oberthueri Le Cerf, 1916
- Melittia oedipus Oberthür, 1878
- Melittia pauper Le Cerf, 1916b
- Melittia pellecta Swinhoe, 1890
- Melittia pijiae Arita & Kallies, 2000
- Melittia phorcus (Westwood, 1848)
- Melittia propria Kallies & Arita, 2003
- Melittia proxima Le Cerf, 1917
- Melittia powelli Le Cerf, 1917
- Melittia pulchripes Walker, 1856
  - Melittia pulchripes pulchripes Walker, 1856
  - Melittia pulchripes dangeloi Köhler, 1941
- Melittia pyropis Hampson, 1919
- Melittia romieuxi Gorbunov & Arita, 1996
- Melittia rufescens (Le Cerf, 1916)
- Melittia rufodorsa Hampson, 1910a
- Melittia rugia Druce, 1910
- Melittia rutilipes Walker, [1865]
- Melittia sangaica Moore, 1877
  - Melittia sangaica sangaica Moore, 1877
  - Melittia sangaica nipponica Arita & Yata, 1987
- Melittia scoliiformis Schade, 1938
- Melittia senohi Arita & Gorbunov, 2000
- Melittia siamica Walker, [1865]
- Melittia simonyi Rebel, 1899
- Melittia smithi Druce, 1889
- Melittia snowii Edwards, 1882
- Melittia staudingeri Boisduval, [1875]
- Melittia strigipennis Walker, [1865]
- Melittia sukothai Arita & Gorbunov, 1996
- Melittia sulphureopyga Le Cerf, 1916
- Melittia sumatrana Le Cerf, 1916
- Melittia superba Rothschild, 1909
- Melittia suzukii Gorbunov & Arita, 1999
- Melittia tabanus Le Cerf, 1916b
- Melittia taiwanensis Arita & Gorbunov, 2002
- Melittia tayuyana Bruch, 1941
- Melittia tigripes Diakonoff, 1954
- Melittia tibialis (Drury, 1773)
- Melittia uenoi Arita & Gorbunov, 2000
- Melittia umbrosa Zukowsky, 1936
- Melittia usambara Le Cerf, 1917
- Melittia volatilis Swinhoe, 1890
- Melittia xanthodes Diakonoff, 1954
- Melittia xanthogaster Hampson, 1919
- Melittia xanthopus Le Cerf, 1916
