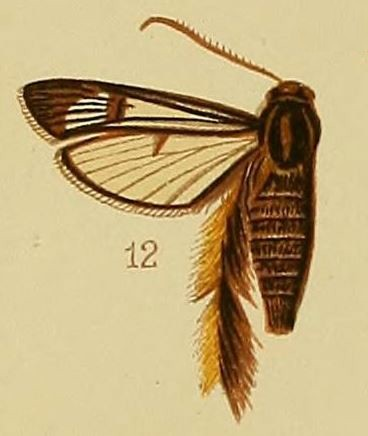

Scientific classification
- Kingdom: Animalia
- Phylum: Arthropoda
- Class: Insecta
- Order: Lepidoptera
- Family: Sesiidae
- Genus: Melittia
- Species: M. auriplumia

Binomial name
- Melittia auriplumia Hampson, 1910

= Melittia auriplumia =

Species of moth

Melittia auriplumia is a moth of the family Sesiidae. It is known from the Republic of the Congo and Uganda.
