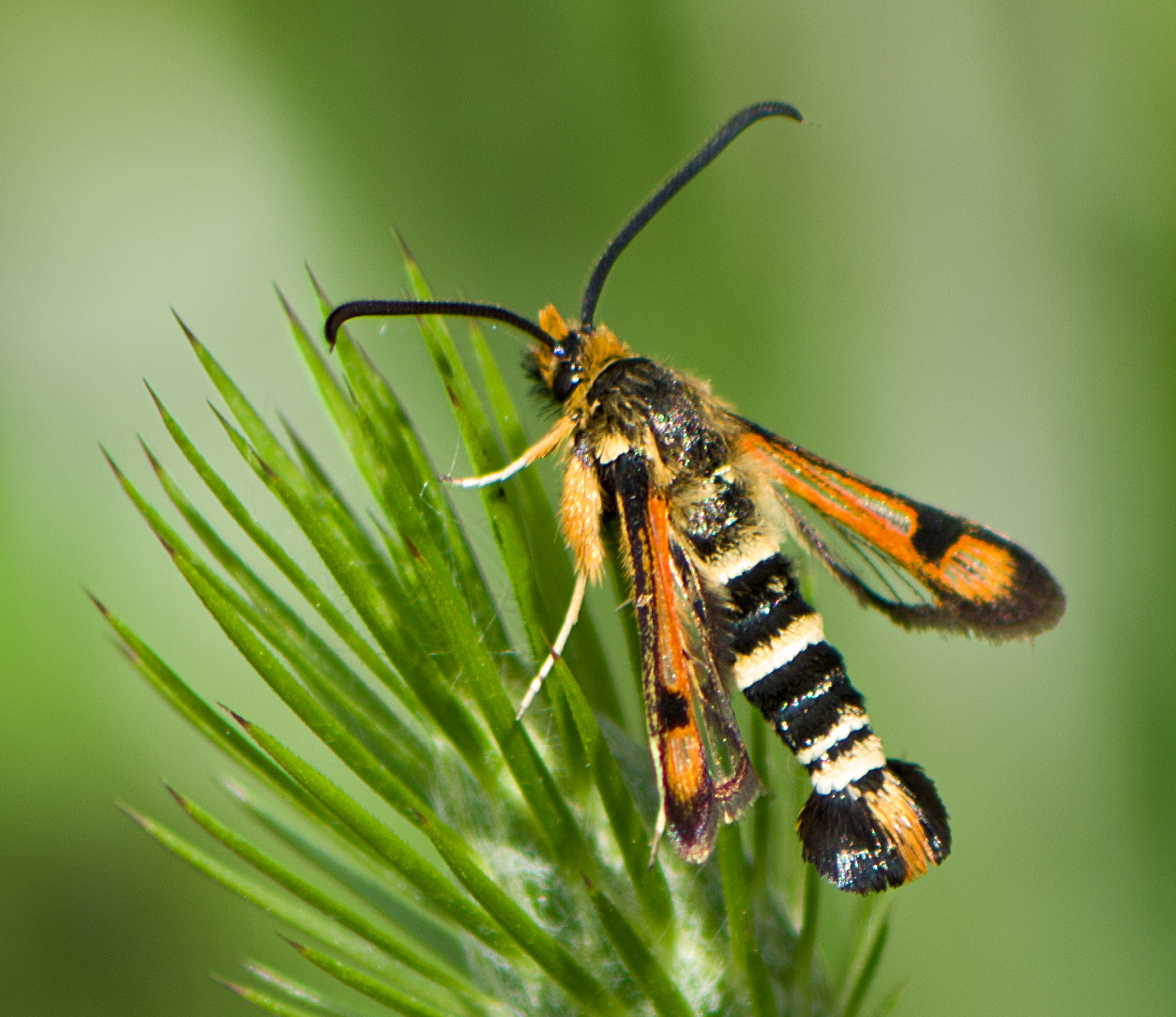

Scientific classification
- Kingdom: Animalia
- Phylum: Arthropoda
- Class: Insecta
- Order: Lepidoptera
- Family: Sesiidae
- Genus: Pyropteron
- Subgenus: Pyropteron
- Species: P. minianiforme

Binomial name
- Pyropteron minianiforme (Freyer, 1843)

Synonyms
- Sesia minianiforme Freyer, 1843; Pyropteron minianiformis; Sesia miniacea Lederer, 1853 (nec Oberthür, 1876); Sesia minianiforme var. pepsiformis Lederer, 1853; Sesia nigrobarbata Rebel, 1916; Chamaesphecia minianiforme ab. friesei Niculescu, 1960; Sesia elampiformis Herrich-Schäffer, 1846; Sesia pepsiformis Herrich-Schäffer, 1846; Sesia eumeniformis Herrich-Schäffer, 1846; Sesia cerceriformis Herrich-Schäffer, 1846; Sesia destitutum Staudinger, 1894

= Pyropteron minianiforme =

Species of moth

Pyropteron minianiforme is a moth of the family Sesiidae. It is found on the Balkan Peninsula, Crete, Cyprus and in Ukraine. It is also found in Turkey, the Caucasus, the Black Sea region, and the Kopet-Dagh.

The wingspan is about 18 mm.

The larvae feed on Rumex acetosa, Rumex palustris, Rumex hydrolapathum, Rumex pulcher, Rumex conglomeratus, Rumex crispus and Rumex maritimus.

== Subspecies ==
- Pyropteron minianiforme minianiforme
- Pyropteron minianiforme destitutum (Staudinger, 1894)
- Pyropteron minianiforme aphrodite Bartsch, 2004
