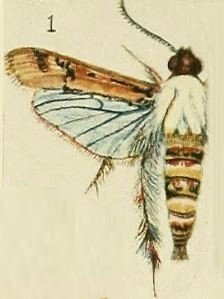

Scientific classification
- Domain: Eukaryota
- Kingdom: Animalia
- Phylum: Arthropoda
- Class: Insecta
- Order: Lepidoptera
- Family: Sesiidae
- Genus: Melittia
- Species: M. haematopis

Binomial name
- Melittia haematopis Fawcett, 1916

= Melittia haematopis =

Species of moth

Melittia haematopis is a moth of the family Sesiidae. It is known from Kenya.
