= Pyropteron aistleitneri =

Scientific classification
- Domain: Eukaryota
- Kingdom: Animalia
- Phylum: Arthropoda
- Class: Insecta
- Order: Lepidoptera
- Family: Sesiidae
- Genus: Pyropteron
- Subgenus: Synansphecia
- Species: P. aistleitneri

Binomial name
- Pyropteron aistleitneri (Spatenka, 1992)

Synonyms
- Synansphecia aistleitneri Spatenka, 1992

Species of moth

Pyropteron aistleitneri is a moth of the family Sesiidae. It is found in Spain (Andalusia).
