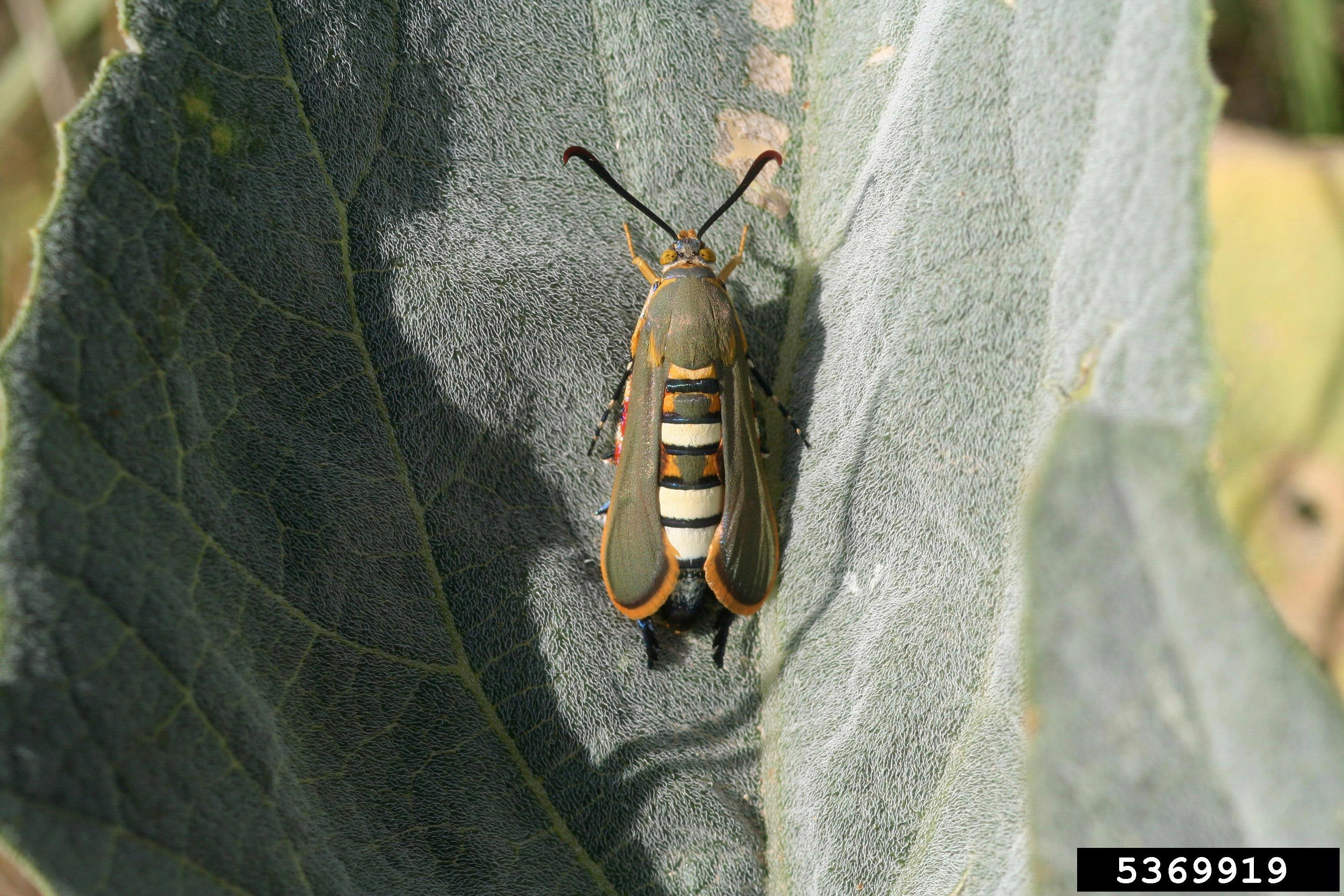

Scientific classification
- Domain: Eukaryota
- Kingdom: Animalia
- Phylum: Arthropoda
- Class: Insecta
- Order: Lepidoptera
- Family: Sesiidae
- Genus: Melittia
- Species: M. gloriosa

Binomial name
- Melittia gloriosa (Edwards, 1881)

Synonyms
- Melittia superba (Barnes & Lindsey, 1922) (nec Melittia superba Rothschild, 1909); Melittia barnesi (Dalla Torre, 1925) replacement name for Melittia superba Barnes & Lindsey, 1922; Melittia lindseyi (Barnes & Benjamin, 1925) replacement name for Melittia superba Barnes & Lindsey, 1922

= Melittia gloriosa =

Species of moth

Melittia gloriosa, the glorious squash vine borer or manroot borer, is a moth of the family Sesiidae. It is known from North America, including Arizona, California, New Mexico, Oklahoma and Texas.

The larvae feed on Cucurbita species. They develop on the tubers of the host plant.
