= Melittia chalconota =

Scientific classification
- Kingdom: Animalia
- Phylum: Arthropoda
- Class: Insecta
- Order: Lepidoptera
- Family: Sesiidae
- Genus: Melittia
- Species: M. chalconota

Binomial name
- Melittia chalconota Hampson, 1910

Species of moth

Melittia chalconota is a moth of the family Sesiidae. It is known from Ghana, Nigeria and Tanzania.
