= Pyropteron mannii =

Scientific classification
- Domain: Eukaryota
- Kingdom: Animalia
- Phylum: Arthropoda
- Class: Insecta
- Order: Lepidoptera
- Family: Sesiidae
- Genus: Pyropteron
- Subgenus: Synansphecia
- Species: P. mannii

Binomial name
- Pyropteron mannii (Lederer, 1853)

Synonyms
- Sesia mannii Lederer, 1853; Synansphecia mannii

Species of moth

Pyropteron mannii is a moth of the family Sesiidae. It is found in north-western Turkey and the coast of Bulgaria nearest the Black Sea.

The larvae feed on Geranium rotundifolium.
