= Melittia laboissierei =

Scientific classification
- Domain: Eukaryota
- Kingdom: Animalia
- Phylum: Arthropoda
- Class: Insecta
- Order: Lepidoptera
- Family: Sesiidae
- Genus: Melittia
- Species: M. laboissierei

Binomial name
- Melittia laboissierei Le Cerf, 1917

Species of moth

Melittia laboissierei is a moth of the family Sesiidae. It is known from Uganda.
