= Melittia ectothyris =

Scientific classification
- Kingdom: Animalia
- Phylum: Arthropoda
- Class: Insecta
- Order: Lepidoptera
- Family: Sesiidae
- Genus: Melittia
- Species: M. ectothyris

Binomial name
- Melittia ectothyris Hampson, 1919

Species of moth

Melittia ectothyris is a moth of the family Sesiidae. It is known from South Africa.
