= Pyropteron hispanicum =

Scientific classification
- Domain: Eukaryota
- Kingdom: Animalia
- Phylum: Arthropoda
- Class: Insecta
- Order: Lepidoptera
- Family: Sesiidae
- Genus: Pyropteron
- Subgenus: Synansphecia
- Species: P. hispanicum

Binomial name
- Pyropteron hispanicum (Kallies, 1999)

Synonyms
- Synansphecia hispanica Kallies, 1999; Pyropteron hispanica

Species of moth

Pyropteron hispanicum is a moth of the family Sesiidae. It is found in southern France, Spain and Portugal (Algarve).

The larvae feed on the roots of Rumex scutatus and Rumex induratus.
