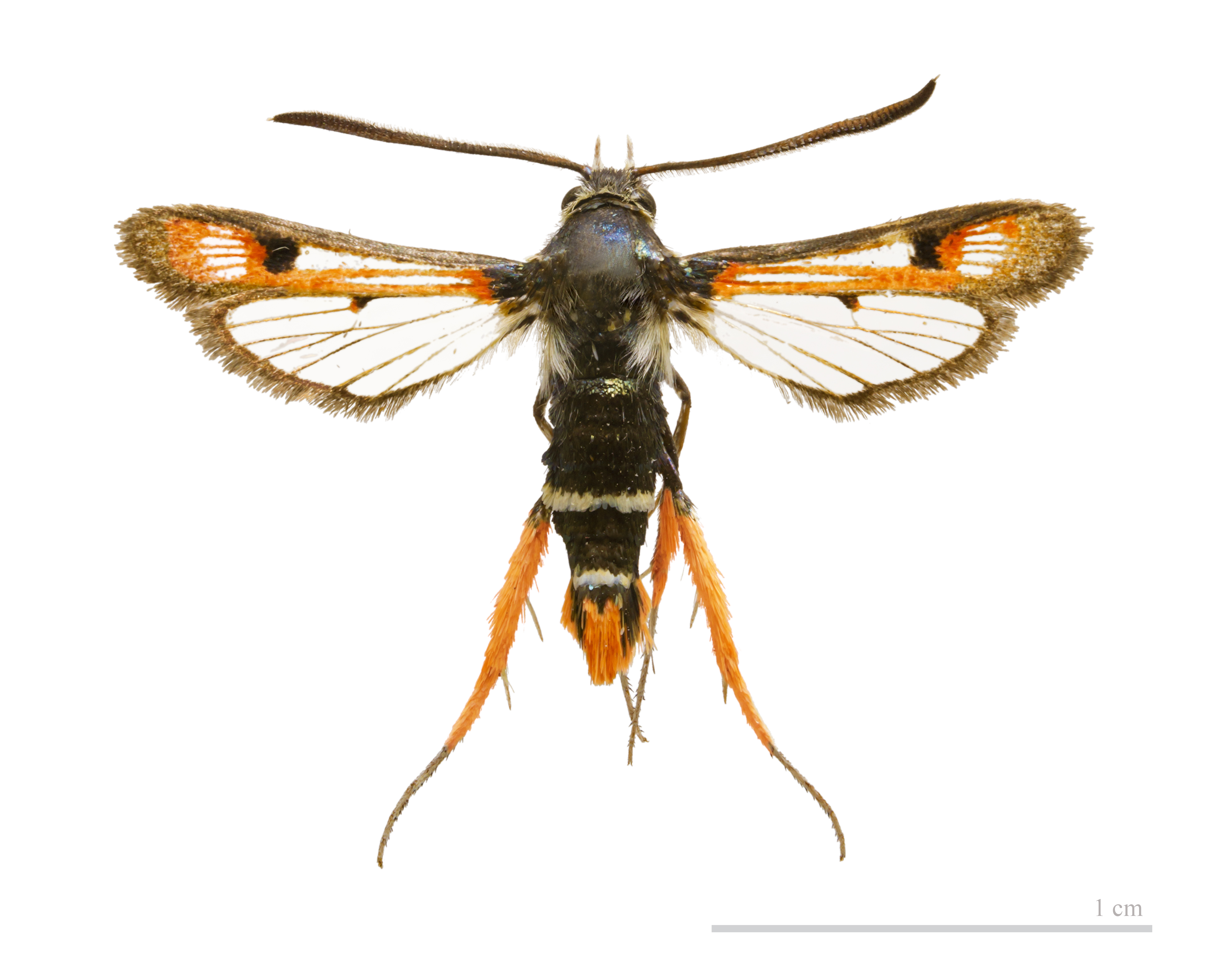
- Pyropteron chrysidiforme - male

Scientific classification
- Domain: Eukaryota
- Kingdom: Animalia
- Phylum: Arthropoda
- Class: Insecta
- Order: Lepidoptera
- Family: Sesiidae
- Tribe: Synanthedonini
- Genus: Pyropteron; Newman, 1832

Species
- See text

= Pyropteron =

Genus of moths

Pyropteron is a genus of moths in the family Sesiidae, raised by the English entomogist, Edward Newman in1832.

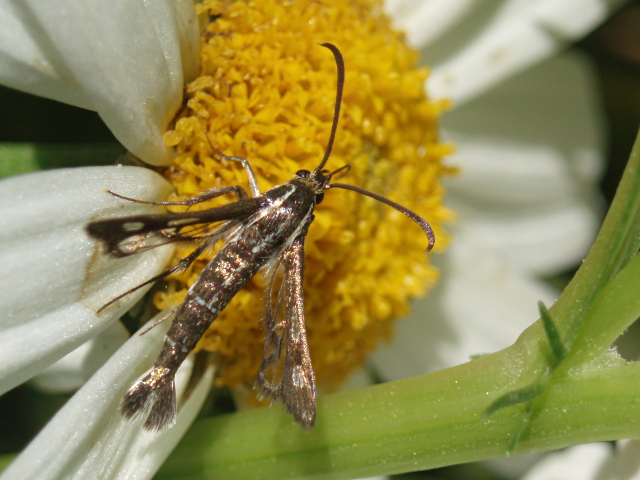
Thrift Clearwing (Pyropteron muscaeformis)

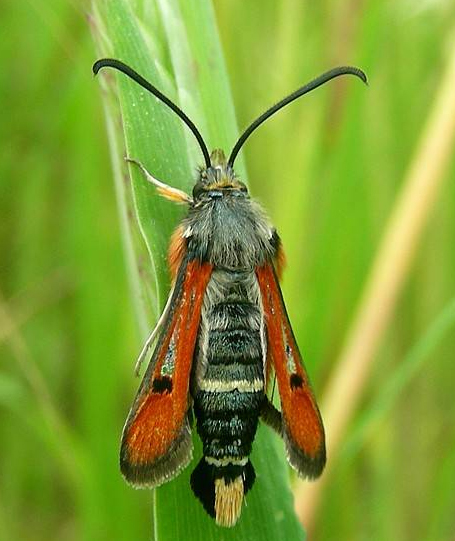
Fiery Clearwing (Pyropteron chrysidiformis)

== Species ==
- Subgenus Pyropteron Newman, 1832
  - Pyropteron biedermanni Le Cerf, 1925
  - Pyropteron ceriaeforme (Lucas, 1849)
  - Pyropteron chrysidiforme (Esper, 1782)
    - Pyropteron chrysidiforme chrysidiforme (Esper, 1782)
    - Pyropteron chrysidiforme siculum Le Cerf, 1922
  - Pyropteron doryliforme (Ochsenheimer, 1808)
    - Pyropteron doryliforme doryliforme (Ochsenheimer, 1808)
    - Pyropteron doryliforme icteropus (Zeller, 1847)
  - Pyropteron minianiforme (Freyer, 1843)
    - Pyropteron minianiforme minianiforme (Freyer, 1843)
    - Pyropteron minianiforme destitutum (Staudinger, 1894)
    - Pyropteron minianiforme aphrodite Bartsch, 2004

- Subgenus Synansphecia Capuse, 1973
  - Pyropteron hispanicum (Kallies, 1999:92)
  - Pyropteron maroccanum (Kallies, 1999)
  - Pyropteron meriaeforme (Boisduval, 1840)
    - Pyropteron meriaeforme meriaeforme (Boisduval, 1840)
    - Pyropteron meriaeforme venetense (de Joannis, 1908)
  - Pyropteron triannuliforme (Freyer, 1842)
  - Pyropteron atlantis (Schwingenschuss, 1935)
  - Pyropteron borreyi (Le Cerf, 1922)
  - Pyropteron koschwitzi (Špatenka, 1992)
  - Pyropteron muscaeforme (Esper, 1783)
    - Pyropteron muscaeforme muscaeforme (Esper, 1783)
    - Pyropteron muscaeforme occidentale (de Joannis, 1908)
    - Pyropteron muscaeforme lusohispanicum Lastuvka & Lastuvka, 2007
  - Pyropteron atypicum Kallies & Špatenka, 2003
  - Pyropteron cirgisum (Bartel, 1912)
  - Pyropteron koshantschikovi (Püngeler, 1914)
  - Pyropteron umbriferum (Staudinger, 1871)
  - Pyropteron affine (Staudinger, 1856)
    - Pyropteron affine affine (Staudinger, 1856)
    - Pyropteron affine erodiiphagum (Dumont, 1922)
  - Pyropteron aistleitneri (Špatenka, 1992)
  - Pyropteron kautzi (Reisser, 1930)
  - Pyropteron leucomelaena (Zeller, 1847)
  - Pyropteron hera (Špatenka, 1997)
  - Pyropteron mannii (Lederer, 1853)
