= Pyropteron affine =

Scientific classification
- Kingdom: Animalia
- Phylum: Arthropoda
- Clade: Pancrustacea
- Class: Insecta
- Order: Lepidoptera
- Family: Sesiidae
- Genus: Pyropteron
- Subgenus: Synansphecia
- Species: P. affine

Binomial name
- Pyropteron affine (Staudinger, 1856)

Synonyms
- Sesia affine Staudinger, 1856; Pyropteron affinis; Synansphecia affinis; Synansphecia affine; Chamaesphecia erodiiphagum Dumont 1922

Species of moth

Pyropteron affine is a moth of the family Sesiidae. It is found in most of Europe, except Ireland, Great Britain, the Netherlands, Denmark, Fennoscandia, the Baltic region, Poland and Bulgaria. It is also found in Asia Minor, Georgia, the Middle East and North Africa (Tunisia, Algeria and Morocco).

The wingspan is 15–18 mm. Adults are on wing from May to July.

The larvae of ssp. affine feed on Helianthemum chamaecistus, Helianthemum vulgare, Helianthemum nummularium and Fumana procumbens, while the larvae of ssp. erodiiphagum have been recorded on Erodium arborescens.

== Subspecies ==
- Pyropteron affine affine
- Pyropteron affine erodiiphagum (Dumont, 1922) (Tunisia, Algeria, Morocco)
