= Melittia lentistriata =

Scientific classification
- Kingdom: Animalia
- Phylum: Arthropoda
- Class: Insecta
- Order: Lepidoptera
- Family: Sesiidae
- Genus: Melittia
- Species: M. lentistriata

Binomial name
- Melittia lentistriata Hampson, 1919

Species of moth

Melittia lentistriata is a moth of the family Sesiidae. It is known from Malawi, Kenya and Zimbabwe.
