= Melittia azrael =

Scientific classification
- Kingdom: Animalia
- Phylum: Arthropoda
- Class: Insecta
- Order: Lepidoptera
- Family: Sesiidae
- Genus: Melittia
- Species: M. azrael

Binomial name
- Melittia azrael Le Cerf, 1914

Species of moth

Melittia azrael is a moth of the family Sesiidae. It is known from Gabon.
