= Pyropteron koschwitzi =

Scientific classification
- Domain: Eukaryota
- Kingdom: Animalia
- Phylum: Arthropoda
- Class: Insecta
- Order: Lepidoptera
- Family: Sesiidae
- Genus: Pyropteron
- Subgenus: Synansphecia
- Species: P. koschwitzi

Binomial name
- Pyropteron koschwitzi (Spatenka, 1992)

Synonyms
- Synansphecia koschwitzi Spatenka, 1992

Species of moth

Pyropteron koschwitzi is a moth of the family Sesiidae. It is found in Spain and Portugal.

The larvae feed on Limonium species, including Limonium toledense and Limonium toletanum.
