= Melittia laniremis =

Scientific classification
- Kingdom: Animalia
- Phylum: Arthropoda
- Class: Insecta
- Order: Lepidoptera
- Family: Sesiidae
- Genus: Melittia
- Species: M. laniremis

Binomial name
- Melittia laniremis (Wallengren, 1860)

Synonyms
- Eumallopoda laniremis Wallengren, 1860

Species of moth

Melittia laniremis is a moth of the family Sesiidae. It is known from South Africa.
