= Pyropteron leucomelaena =

Scientific classification
- Kingdom: Animalia
- Phylum: Arthropoda
- Clade: Pancrustacea
- Class: Insecta
- Order: Lepidoptera
- Family: Sesiidae
- Genus: Pyropteron
- Subgenus: Synansphecia
- Species: P. leucomelaena

Binomial name
- Pyropteron leucomelaena (Zeller, 1847)

Synonyms
- Sesia leucomelaena Zeller, 1847; Synansphecia leucomelaena; Sesia therevaeformis Lederer, 1853; Sesia cretica Rebel, 1916; Chamaesphecia leucomelaena f. cyrnea Le Cerf, 1920

Species of moth

Pyropteron leucomelaena is a moth of the family Sesiidae. It is found in France, Spain, Portugal, Italy, the Balkan Peninsula and Ukraine. It is also found in North Africa and from Asia Minor to Armenia.

The larvae feed on Sanguisorba minor.
