= Melittia abyssiniensis =

Scientific classification
- Kingdom: Animalia
- Phylum: Arthropoda
- Class: Insecta
- Order: Lepidoptera
- Family: Sesiidae
- Genus: Melittia
- Species: M. abyssiniensis

Binomial name
- Melittia abyssiniensis Hampson, 1919

Species of moth

Melittia abyssiniensis is a moth of the family Sesiidae. It is known from Ethiopia.
