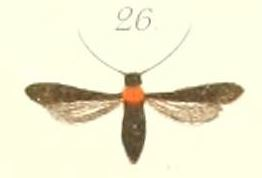

Scientific classification
- Domain: Eukaryota
- Kingdom: Animalia
- Phylum: Arthropoda
- Class: Insecta
- Order: Lepidoptera
- Family: Sesiidae
- Genus: Tinthia
- Species: T. ruficollaris

Binomial name
- Tinthia ruficollaris (Pagenstecher, 1900)

Synonyms
- Paranthrene ruficollaris Pagenstecher, 1900

= Tinthia ruficollaris =

Species of moth

Tinthia ruficollaris is a moth of the family Sesiidae. It is found in Papua New Guinea.
