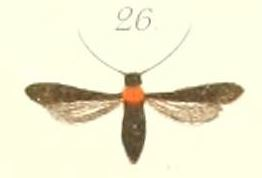
- Tinthia ruficollaris

Scientific classification
- Kingdom: Animalia
- Phylum: Arthropoda
- Class: Insecta
- Order: Lepidoptera
- Family: Sesiidae
- Tribe: Tinthiini
- Genus: Tinthia; Walker, [1865]

Species
- See text

= Tinthia =

Genus of moths

Tinthia is a genus of moths in the family Sesiidae.

== Species ==
- Tinthia beijingana Yang, 1977:120
- Tinthia mianjangalica Laštuvka, 1997
- Tinthia cuprealis (Moore, 1877)
- Tinthia ruficollaris (Pagenstecher, 1900)
- Tinthia varipes Walker, [1865]
- Tinthia xanthospila Hampson, 1919
