= Pyropteron meriaeforme =

Scientific classification
- Domain: Eukaryota
- Kingdom: Animalia
- Phylum: Arthropoda
- Class: Insecta
- Order: Lepidoptera
- Family: Sesiidae
- Genus: Pyropteron
- Subgenus: Synansphecia
- Species: P. meriaeforme

Binomial name
- Pyropteron meriaeforme (Boisduval, 1840)

Synonyms
- Sesia meriaeforme Boisduval, 1840; Pyropteron meriaeformis; Synansphecia meriaeformis; Sesia meriiformis Rambur, [1866]; Sesia corsica Staudinger, 1856; Sesia venetense de Joannis, 1908

Species of moth

Pyropteron meriaeforme is a moth of the family Sesiidae. It is found in Spain, Portugal, southern France, Italy and on Corsica, Sardinia and Sicily.

The wingspan is 14–15 mm.

The larvae feed on Rumex acetosella.

== Subspecies ==
- Pyropteron meriaeforme meriaeforme
- Pyropteron meriaeforme venetense (de Joannis, 1908)
