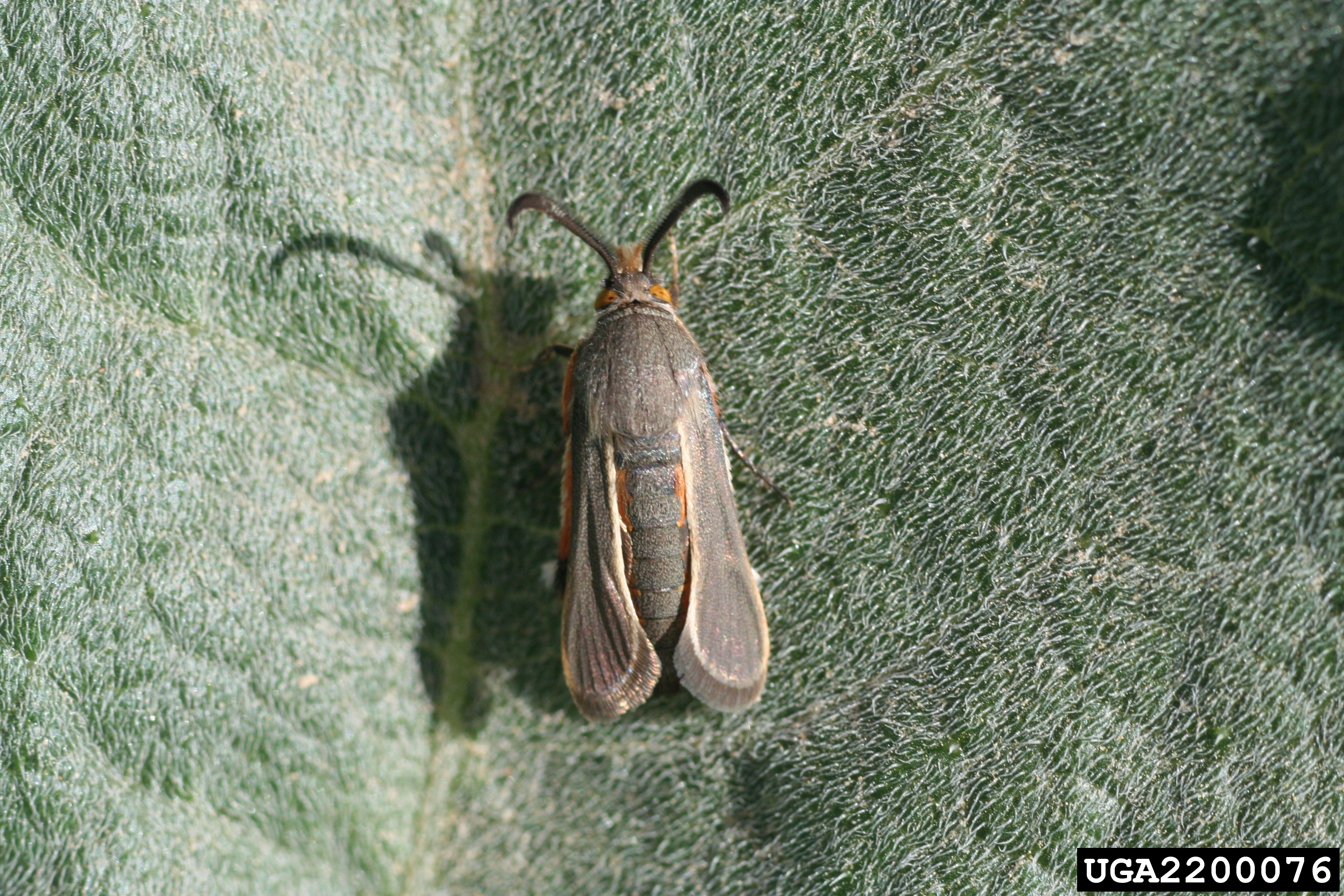

Scientific classification
- Domain: Eukaryota
- Kingdom: Animalia
- Phylum: Arthropoda
- Class: Insecta
- Order: Lepidoptera
- Family: Sesiidae
- Genus: Melittia
- Species: M. snowii

Binomial name
- Melittia snowii Edwards, 1882

= Melittia snowii =

Species of moth

Melittia snowii is a moth of the family Sesiidae. It is known from the United States, including Arizona.

The wingspan is about 23 mm.

The larvae feed on Cucurbita foetidissima.
