= Melittia usambara =

Scientific classification
- Kingdom: Animalia
- Phylum: Arthropoda
- Class: Insecta
- Order: Lepidoptera
- Family: Sesiidae
- Genus: Melittia
- Species: M. usambara

Binomial name
- Melittia usambara Le Cerf, 1917

Species of moth

Melittia usambara is a moth of the family Sesiidae. It is known from Tanzania.
