= Melittia hyaloxantha =

Scientific classification
- Kingdom: Animalia
- Phylum: Arthropoda
- Class: Insecta
- Order: Lepidoptera
- Family: Sesiidae
- Genus: Melittia
- Species: M. hyaloxantha

Binomial name
- Melittia hyaloxantha Meyrick, 1928

Species of moth

Melittia hyaloxantha is a moth of the family Sesiidae. It is known from the Democratic Republic of the Congo.
