= Melittia aureosquamata =

Scientific classification
- Kingdom: Animalia
- Phylum: Arthropoda
- Class: Insecta
- Order: Lepidoptera
- Family: Sesiidae
- Genus: Melittia
- Species: M. aureosquamata

Binomial name
- Melittia aureosquamata (Wallengren, 1863)

Synonyms
- Parasa aureosquamata Wallengren, 1863

Species of moth

Melittia aureosquamata is a moth of the family Sesiidae. It is known from Malawi, South Africa and Zambia.
