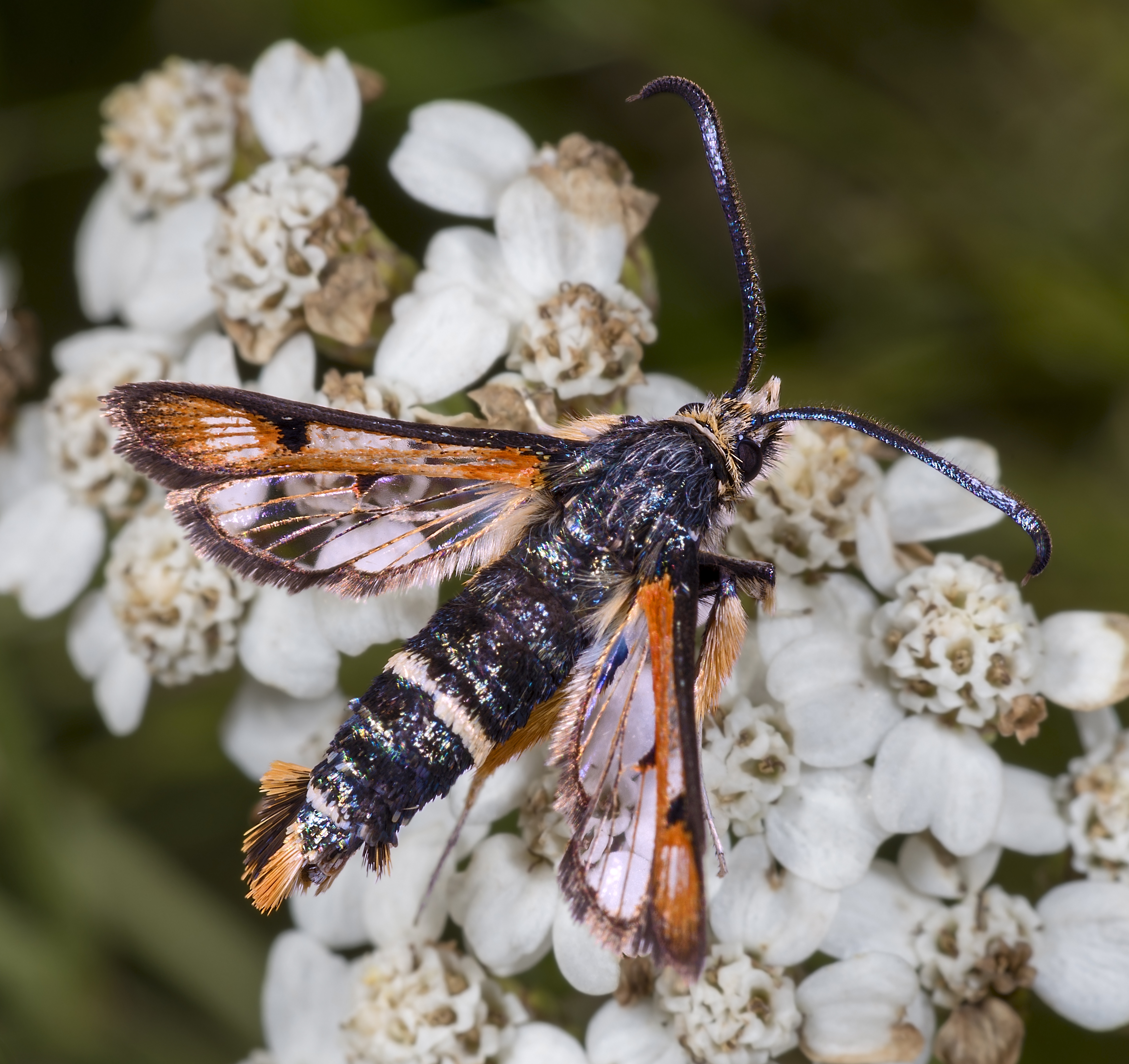
- Living
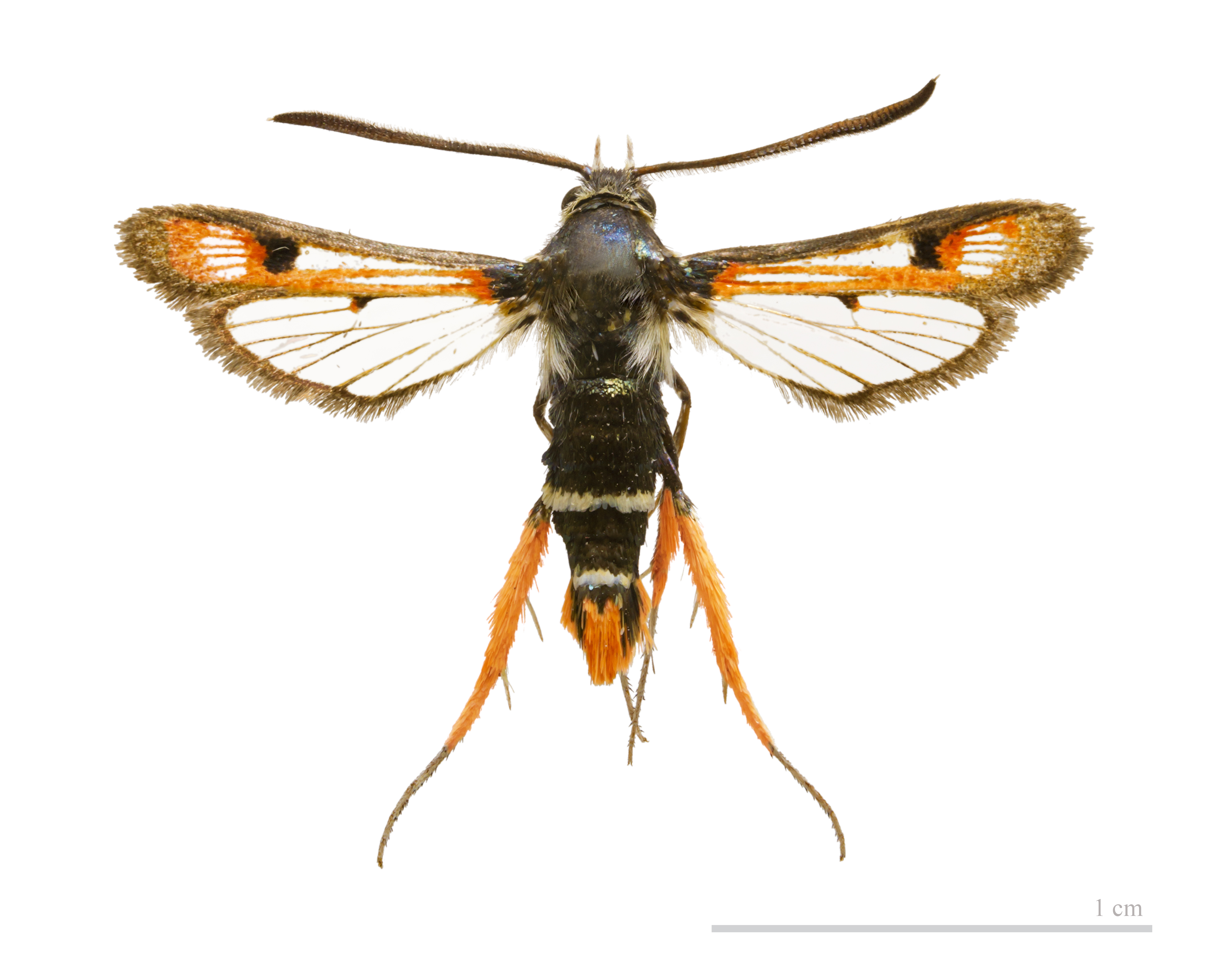
- Mounted male

Scientific classification
- Domain: Eukaryota
- Kingdom: Animalia
- Phylum: Arthropoda
- Class: Insecta
- Order: Lepidoptera
- Family: Sesiidae
- Genus: Pyropteron
- Subgenus: Pyropteron
- Species: P. chrysidiforme

Binomial name
- Pyropteron chrysidiforme (Esper, 1782)

Synonyms
- Sphinx chrysidiforme Esper, 1782; Sesia crabroniformis Fabricius, 1793 (nec Laspeyres, 1801); Pyropteron haemorrhoidalis Cyrillus, 1787; Sesia polistiformis Boisduval, 1840; Sesia chalcocnemis Staudinger, 1856; Sesia depuiseti Sand, 1879; Sesia chrysidiforme var. joannisi Le Cerf, 1909; Sesia chrysidiforme f. obturata Le Cerf, 1909; Sesia chrysidiforme f. nigripes Le Cerf, 1909; Sesia lecerfi Oberthür, 1909; Sesia rondoui Siepi, 1909; Pyropteron chrysidiforme var. castiliana Le Cerf, 1922; Pyropteron chrysidiforme var. chlorotica Le Cerf, 1922; Pyropteron chrysidiforme ab. gallica Bartel, 1902; Sesia chrysidiforme ab. infusca Le Cerf, 1909; Chamaesphecia chrysidiforme ab. lecerfi Schawerda, 1938; Pyropteron chrysidiforme ab. margaritosa Le Cerf, 1922; Pyropteron chrysidiforme ab. anthracias Le Cerf, 1922; Pyropteron chrysidiforme f. fervens Bytinski-Salz, [1937]; Pyropteron chrysidiforme ab. melanoxanthia Le Cerf, 1922; Pyropteron chrysidiforme ab. foeniformoides Ragusa, 1923; Pyropteron chrysidiformis; Bembecia chrysidiformis

= Pyropteron chrysidiforme =

Species of moth

Pyropteron chrysidiforme, the fiery clearwing, is a moth of the family Sesiidae. It is found in Europe, more specifically in Spain, Portugal, Majorca, southern England, Belgium, France, Corsica, Sardinia, Italy and southern Germany.

The wingspan is 15–23 mm. The moth flies from June to July depending on the location.

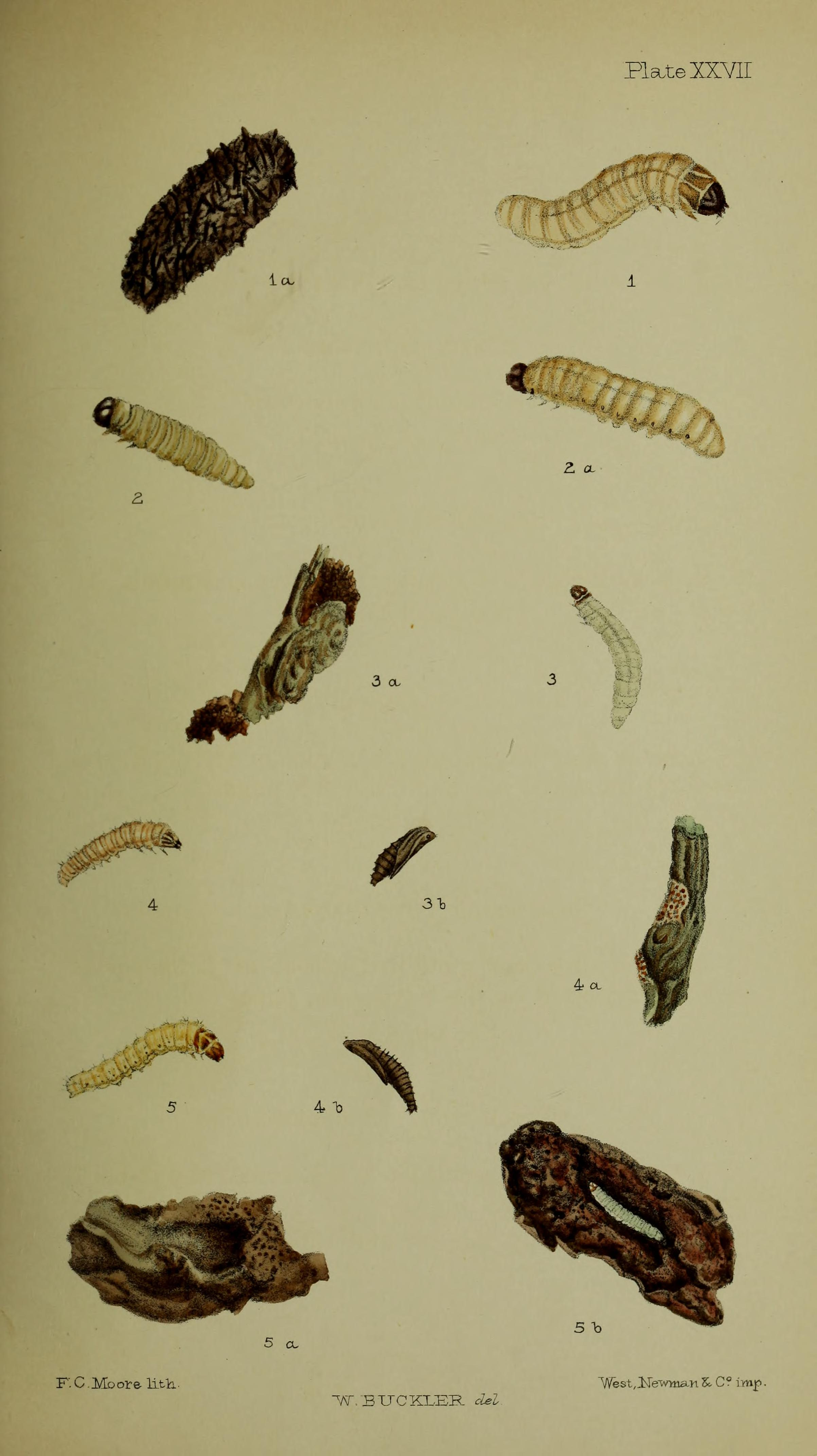
Figs. 3 larvae after last moult 3a root of sorrel Rumex acetosa inhabited by the larva 3b pupa

The larvae feed on Rumex species.

== Subspecies ==
- Pyropteron chrysidiforme chrysidiforme
- Pyropteron chrysidiforme siculum Le Cerf, 1922
