= Melittia aurociliata =

Scientific classification
- Kingdom: Animalia
- Phylum: Arthropoda
- Class: Insecta
- Order: Lepidoptera
- Family: Sesiidae
- Genus: Melittia
- Species: M. aurociliata

Binomial name
- Melittia aurociliata (Aurivillius, 1879)

Synonyms
- Pansa aurociliata Aurivillius, 1879

Species of moth

Melittia aurociliata is a moth of the family Sesiidae. It is known from Namibia.
