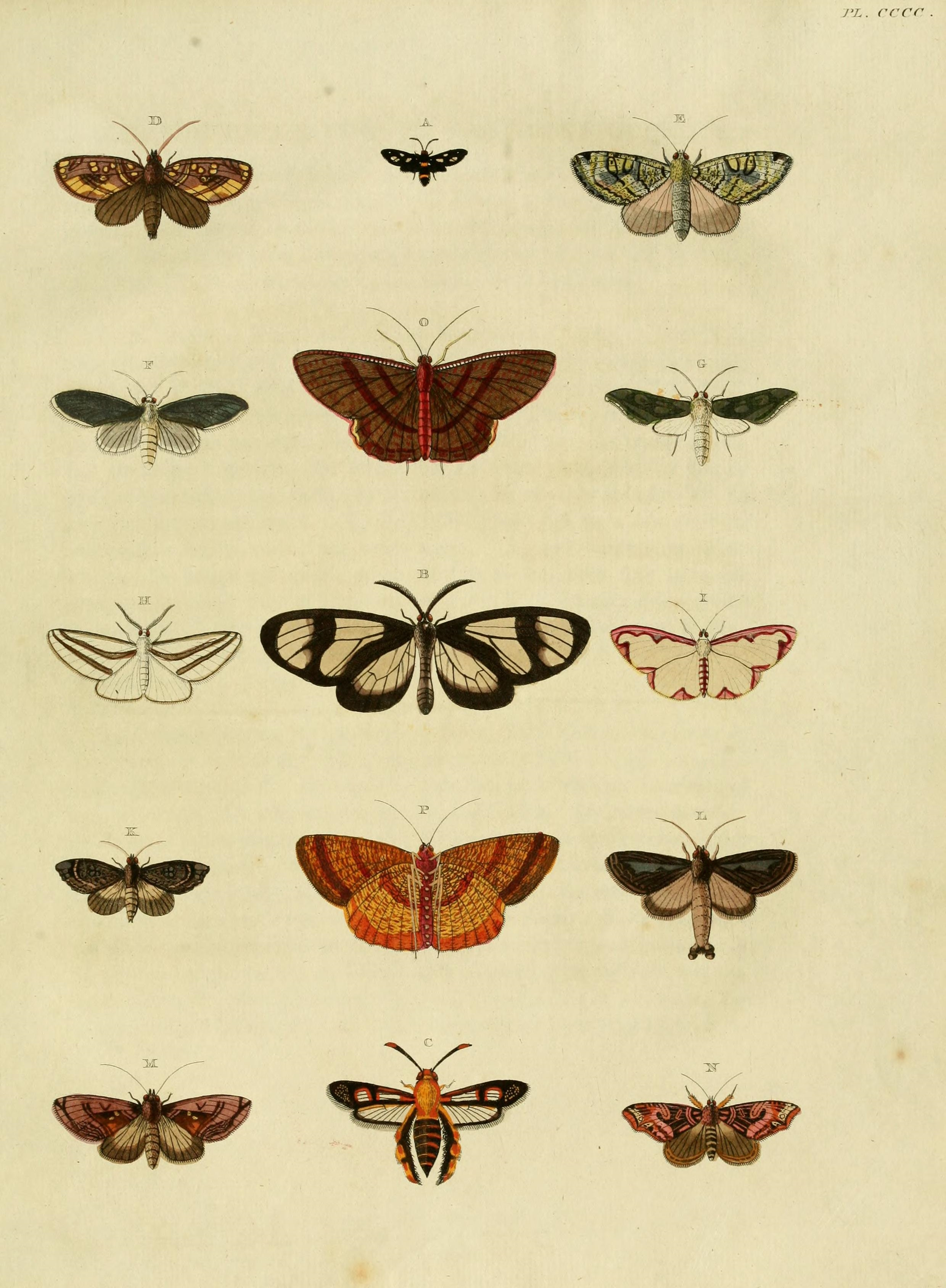
- Lower middle

Scientific classification
- Domain: Eukaryota
- Kingdom: Animalia
- Phylum: Arthropoda
- Class: Insecta
- Order: Lepidoptera
- Family: Sesiidae
- Genus: Melittia
- Species: M. bombyliformis

Binomial name
- Melittia bombyliformis Cramer, 1782

Synonyms
- Melittia anthedoniformis Hübner, 1819; Melittia arrecta Meyrick, 1918; Melittia bombylipennis Boisduval, 1875; Sesia chalciformis Fabricius, 1793

= Melittia bombyliformis =

Species of moth

Melittia bombyliformis is a moth of the family Sesiidae first described by Pieter Cramer in 1782. It is found in India and Sri Lanka.
