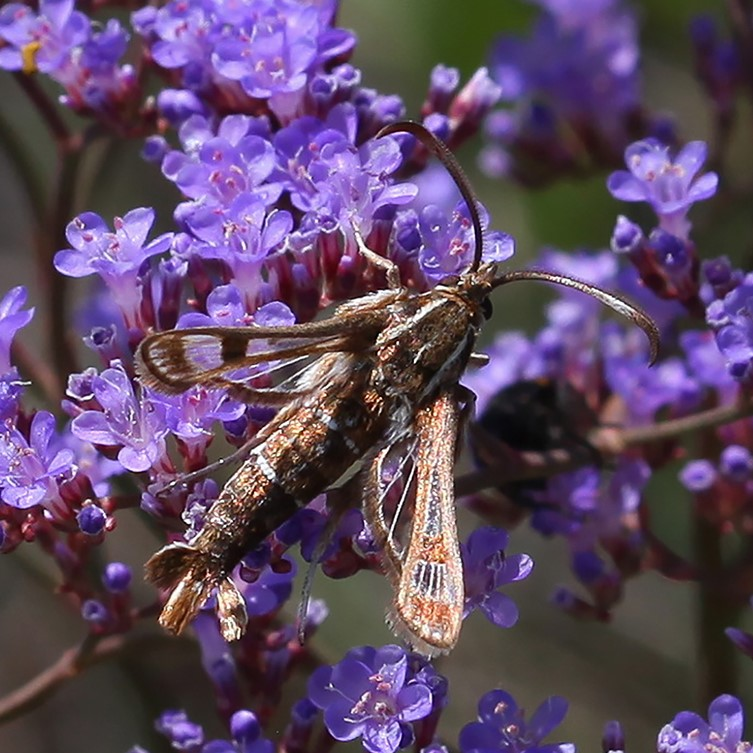

Scientific classification
- Kingdom: Animalia
- Phylum: Arthropoda
- Class: Insecta
- Order: Lepidoptera
- Family: Sesiidae
- Genus: Pyropteron
- Subgenus: Synansphecia
- Species: P. cirgisum

Binomial name
- Pyropteron cirgisum (Bartel, 1912)

Synonyms
- Chamaesphecia cirgisum Bartel, 1912; Pyropteron cirgisa; Synansphecia cirgisa; Chamaesphecia montandoni Le Cerf, 1922

= Pyropteron cirgisum =

Species of moth

Pyropteron cirgisum is a species of moth in the family Sesiidae. It is found in scattered localities in Romania, Ukraine, Russia, Azerbaijan, Turkey, Turkmenistan, and Kazakhstan.

The larvae feed on Limonium species, including Limonium gmelini and Limonium iconicum.
