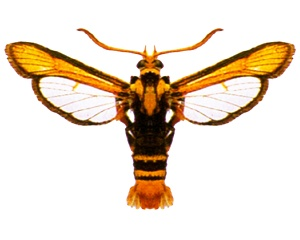

Scientific classification
- Kingdom: Animalia
- Phylum: Arthropoda
- Class: Insecta
- Order: Lepidoptera
- Family: Sesiidae
- Genus: Pseudosesia
- Species: P. oberthuri

Binomial name
- Pseudosesia oberthuri (Le Cerf, 1916)

Synonyms
- Albuna oberthuri (Le Cerf, 1916); Phlogothauma oberthuri Le Cerf, 1916; Paranthrene oberthuri (Le Cerf, 1916); Sciapteron terribile Turner, 1917

= Pseudosesia oberthuri =

Species of moth

Pseudosesia oberthuri, the golden clearwing, is a moth of the family Sesiidae. It is found in the northern part of Australia.

The wingspan is ca. 20 mm.

The larvae feed on Ampelocissus acetosa, among other plants.
