= Pseudosesia zoniota =

Scientific classification
- Domain: Eukaryota
- Kingdom: Animalia
- Phylum: Arthropoda
- Class: Insecta
- Order: Lepidoptera
- Family: Sesiidae
- Genus: Pseudosesia
- Species: P. zoniota

Binomial name
- Pseudosesia zoniota (Turner, 1922)

Synonyms
- Paranthrene zoniota Turner, 1922; Paranthrene zonionota; Albuna zoniota (Turner, 1922)

Species of moth

Pseudosesia zoniota is a moth of the family Sesiidae. It is known only from the female holotype which was collected near the Claudie River on the Cape York Peninsula in Queensland, Australia.

The length of the forewings is about 11 millimetres (0.43 in) for females.
