= Pseudosesia =

Scientific classification
- Domain: Eukaryota
- Kingdom: Animalia
- Phylum: Arthropoda
- Class: Insecta
- Order: Lepidoptera
- Family: Sesiidae
- Tribe: Paranthrenini
- Genus: Pseudosesia; Felder, 1861

Species
- See text

Genus of moths

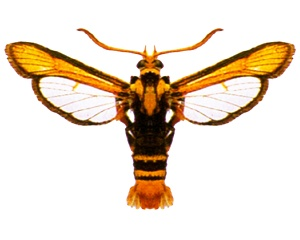
Albuna oberthuri (Golden Clearwing).

Pseudosesia is a genus of moths in the family Sesiidae.

== Species ==
- Pseudosesia albifrons (Hampson, 1919)
- Pseudosesia caeruleimicans (Hampson, [1893])
- Pseudosesia canarensis (Hampson, 1919)
- Pseudosesia charlesi (Le Cerf, 1916b)
- Pseudosesia croconeura (Meyrick, 1926)
- Pseudosesia flavifrons (Hampson, 1919)
- Pseudosesia grotei Moore, 1879
- Pseudosesia insularis Felder, 1861
- Pseudosesia limpida (Le Cerf, 1916)
- Pseudosesia opalescens (Hampson, 1919)
- Pseudosesia pentazonata (Hampson, 1919)
- Pseudosesia productalis (Walker, [1865])
- Pseudosesia rangoonensis (Swinhoe, 1890)
- Pseudosesia isozona (Meyrick, 1887)
- Pseudosesia oberthueri (Le Cerf, 1916)
- Pseudosesia zoniota (Turner, 1922:62)
