= Melittia doddi =

Scientific classification
- Domain: Eukaryota
- Kingdom: Animalia
- Phylum: Arthropoda
- Class: Insecta
- Order: Lepidoptera
- Family: Sesiidae
- Genus: Melittia
- Species: M. doddi

Binomial name
- Melittia doddi Le Cerf, 1916

Synonyms
- Melittia amboinensis var. doddi LeCerf, 1917; Melittia thaumasia Turner, 1917

Species of moth

Melittia doddi is a moth of the family Sesiidae. It is known only from Queensland, where it was collected near Kuranda.

The length of the forewings is 12–14 mm for males and 13–14 mm for females.

== Taxonomy ==
Melittia doddi was formerly considered a synonym or variety of Melittia amboinensis C. Felder, 1861 .
