= Ichneumenoptera chrysophanes =

Scientific classification
- Kingdom: Animalia
- Phylum: Arthropoda
- Class: Insecta
- Order: Lepidoptera
- Family: Sesiidae
- Genus: Ichneumenoptera
- Species: I. chrysophanes

Binomial name
- Ichneumenoptera chrysophanes (Meyrick, 1886)

Synonyms
- Carmenta chrysophanes (Meyrick, 1886); Sesia chrysophanes Meyrick, 1886; Aegeria panyasis Druce, 1899; Aegeria caieta Druce, 1899; Conopia melanocera Hampson, 1919; Synanthedon chrysophanes; Trochilium chrysophanes; Conopia chrysophanes

Species of moth

Ichneumenoptera chrysophanes, the clearwing persimmon borer, is a moth of the family Sesiidae. It is found from Cairns in Queensland to Canberra in the Australian Capital Territory.

The length of the forewings is 7–8 mm for males and 7–10 mm for females.

The larvae bore in the inner bark of Alphitonia excelsa, the injured bark of Eucalyptus species, in branches of Ficus species, stems of Wisteria species and in woody galls on branches of Exocarpos cupressiformis. They are considered a pest on Diospyros kaki, of which they feed on the bark.
