= Melittia chalybescens =

Scientific classification
- Kingdom: Animalia
- Phylum: Arthropoda
- Clade: Pancrustacea
- Class: Insecta
- Order: Lepidoptera
- Family: Sesiidae
- Genus: Melittia
- Species: M. chalybescens

Binomial name
- Melittia chalybescens Miskin, 1892

Synonyms
- Melittia proserpina Hampson, 1919

Species of moth

Melittia chalybescens is a moth of the family Sesiidae. It is known only from Queensland, where it was collected near Kuranda and Mackay.

The length of the forewings is 14–15 mm for males and about 16 mm for females.
