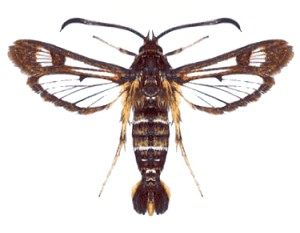

Scientific classification
- Kingdom: Animalia
- Phylum: Arthropoda
- Clade: Pancrustacea
- Class: Insecta
- Order: Lepidoptera
- Family: Sesiidae
- Genus: Pyropteron
- Subgenus: Pyropteron
- Species: P. doryliformis

Binomial name
- Pyropteron doryliformis (Ochsenheimer, 1808)

Synonyms
- Sesia doryliforme Ochsenheimer, 1808; Sesia euglossaeformis Lucas, 1849; Pyropteron doryliforme var. bellieri Le Cerf, 1916; Pyropteron doryliforme f. chimena Le Cerf, 1916; Pyropteron doryliforme f. funebris Le Cerf, 1916; Pyropteron doryliforme f. intermedia Le Cerf, 1916; Pyropteron doryliforme f. melanina Le Cerf, 1916; Pyropteron doryliforme f. subceriaeformis Le Cerf, 1916; Pyropteron tingitana Le Cerf, 1916; Pyropteron doryliforme var. andalusica Le Cerf, 1920; Pyropteron doryliforme var. chretieni Le Cerf, 1920; Pyropteron doryliforme f. androchroma Le Cerf, 1934; Pyropteron doryliforme ab. flavina Le Cerf, 1920; Sesia icteropus Zeller, 1847; Sesia doryliforme ab. unicolor Ragusa, 1904 (nec Walker, [1865]); Synansphecia doryliformis; Pyropteron doryliforme; Chamaesphecia doryliformis

= Pyropteron doryliformis =

Species of moth

Pyropteron doryliformis, the dock clearwing or dock moth, is a moth of the family Sesiidae. It is found in south-west Europe, North Africa and Australasian realm.

The wingspan is about 20 mm.

The larvae feed on Rumex (dock). In 1997, it was introduced into Tasmania and subsequently monitored as a possible biological control against dock.

== Subspecies ==
- Pyropteron doryliformis doryliformis
- Pyropteron doryliformis icteropus (Zeller, 1847)
