= Ichneumenoptera commoni =

Scientific classification
- Domain: Eukaryota
- Kingdom: Animalia
- Phylum: Arthropoda
- Class: Insecta
- Order: Lepidoptera
- Family: Sesiidae
- Genus: Ichneumenoptera
- Species: I. commoni

Binomial name
- Ichneumenoptera commoni (Duckworth & Eichlin, 1974)

Synonyms
- Carmenta commoni Duckworth & Eichlin, 1974

Species of moth

Ichneumenoptera commoni is a moth of the family Sesiidae which was described by W. Donald Duckworth and Thomas Drake Eichlin in 1974. It is known only from the male type which was collected near Toowoomba in Queensland, Australia.

The length of the forewings is about 8.5 mm for males.
