= Pseudosesia isozona =

Scientific classification
- Kingdom: Animalia
- Phylum: Arthropoda
- Class: Insecta
- Order: Lepidoptera
- Family: Sesiidae
- Genus: Pseudosesia
- Species: P. isozona

Binomial name
- Pseudosesia isozona (Meyrick, 1886)

Synonyms
- Albuna isozona (Meyrick, 1886); Sesia isozona Meyrick, 1886; Trochilium isozonum; Paranthrene isozona

Species of moth

Pseudosesia isozona is a moth of the family Sesiidae. It is found in Queensland, Australia.

The length of the forewings is 10–11 mm for males and about 11 mm for females.
