= Tinthia xanthospila =

Scientific classification
- Kingdom: Animalia
- Phylum: Arthropoda
- Class: Insecta
- Order: Lepidoptera
- Family: Sesiidae
- Genus: Tinthia
- Species: T. xanthospila

Binomial name
- Tinthia xanthospila Hampson, 1919

Synonyms
- Tinthia xanthopila (misspelling)

Species of moth

Tinthia xanthospila is a moth of the family Sesiidae. It is only known from the type specimen, which was collected at Cedar Bay in Queensland, Australia.

The length of the forewings is about 7 mm for males.
