= Ichneumenoptera xanthogyna =

Scientific classification
- Kingdom: Animalia
- Phylum: Arthropoda
- Class: Insecta
- Order: Lepidoptera
- Family: Sesiidae
- Genus: Ichneumenoptera
- Species: I. xanthogyna

Binomial name
- Ichneumenoptera xanthogyna (Hampson, 1919)

Synonyms
- Lepidopoda xanthogyna Hampson, 1919; Carmenta xanthogyna (Hampson, 1919)

Species of moth

Ichneumenoptera xanthogyna is a moth of the family Sesiidae. It is known only from locations near Kuranda in Queensland, Australia.

The length of the forewings is about 11 mm for males and about 15 mm for females.
