= Nokona coracodes =

Scientific classification
- Kingdom: Animalia
- Phylum: Arthropoda
- Class: Insecta
- Order: Lepidoptera
- Family: Sesiidae
- Genus: Nokona
- Species: N. coracodes

Binomial name
- Nokona coracodes (Turner, 1922)

Synonyms
- Trochilium coracodes Turner, 1922; Conopia coracodes Dalla Torre & Strand, 1925; Sphecia coracodes Gaede, 1933

Species of moth

Nokona coracodes is a moth of the family Sesiidae. It is only known from Toowoomba, Queensland.
