= List of moths of India (Sesiidae) =

This is a list of moths of the family Sesiidae that are found in India. It also acts as an index to the species articles and forms part of the full List of moths of India.

== Genus Pramila ==
- Pramila atkinsoni Moore, 1879

== Genus Trochilium ==
- Trochilium ommatiaeforme Moore
- Trochilium ignicolle Hampson

== Genus Sphecodoptera ==
- Sphecodoptera repanda Walker
- Sphecodoptera flavicollis Hampson

== Genus Anthrenoptera ==
- Anthrenoptera contracta Walker

== Genus Trilochana ==
- Trilochana scolioides Moore
- Trilochana ignicauda Hampson

== Genus Sciapteron ==
- Sciapteron flammans Hampson
- Sciapteron grotei Moore
- Sciapteron cgeruleimicans Hampson
- Sciapteron atkinsoni Moore
- Sciapteron noblei Swinhoe
- Sciapteron sikkima Moore
- Sciapteron metallicum Hampson
- Sciapteron gracile Swinhoe
- Sciapteron cupreivitta Hampson
- Sciapteron tenuimarginatiim Hampson

== Genus Macrotarsipus ==
- Macrotarsipus albipunctus Hampson

== Genus Ichneumenoptera ==
- Ichneumenoptera auripes Hampson
- Ichneumenoptera flavicincta Hampson
- Ichneumenoptera xanthosoma Hampson
- Ichneumenoptera flavipalpus Hampson
- Ichneumenoptera ignifera Hampson

== Genus Sesia ==
- Sesia quinquecincta Hampson
- Sesia minuta Swinhoe
- Sesia unicincta Hampson
- Sesia xanthosticta Hampson
- Sesia tricincta Moore
- Sesia flavicaudata Moore
- Sesia flavipes Hampson

== Genus Adixoa ==
- Adixoa alterna Walker
- Adixoa auricollum Hampson

== Genus Trichocerota ==
- Trichocerota ruficincta Hampson

== Genus Tinthia ==
- Tinthia cupreipennis Walker

== Genus Ceratocorema ==
- Ceratocorema postcristatum Hampson

== Genus Aschistophleps ==
- Aschistophleps lampropoda Hampson
- mehssoides mehssoides Hampson

== Genus Oligophlebia ==
- Oligophlebia nigralba Hampson

== Genus Melittia ==
- Melittia astarte Westwood
- Melittia pellecta Swinhoe
- Melittia volatilis Swinhoe
- Melittia eurytion Westwood
- Melittia indica Butler
- Melittia grandis Hampson
- Melittia newara Moore
- Melittia kuluana Moore
- Melittia notabilis Swinhoe
- Melittia gigantea Moore
- Melittia chalciformis Fabricius
- Melittia nepcha Moore

== Genus Lenyra ==
- Lenyra ashtaroth Westwood

== See also ==
- Sesiidae
- Moths
- Lepidoptera
- List of moths of India
