= Tipulamima =

Scientific classification
- Domain: Eukaryota
- Kingdom: Animalia
- Phylum: Arthropoda
- Class: Insecta
- Order: Lepidoptera
- Family: Sesiidae
- Subfamily: Sesiinae
- Tribe: Synanthedonini
- Genus: Tipulamima; Holland, 1893

Species
- See text

Synonyms
- Macrotarsipodes Le Cerf, 1916

Genus of moths

Tipulamima is a genus of moths in the family Sesiidae.

== Species ==
- Tipulamima aristura (Meyrick, 1931)
- Tipulamima auronitens (Le Cerf, 1913)
- Tipulamima festiva (Beutenmüller, 1899)
- Tipulamima flammipes (Hampson, 1910)
- Tipulamima flavifrons Holland, 1893
- Tipulamima grandidieri (Le Cerf, 1917)
- Tipulamima haugi (Le Cerf, 1917)
- Tipulamima hypocalla Le Cerf, 1937
- Tipulamima ivondro Viette, [1955]
- Tipulamima malimba (Beutenmüller, 1899)
- Tipulamima nigriceps Hampson, 1919
- Tipulamima opalimargo (Le Cerf, 1913)
- Tipulamima pedunculata (Hampson, 1910)
- Tipulamima pyrosoma Hampson, 1919
- Tipulamima sexualis (Hampson, 1910)
- Tipulamima seyrigi Viette, [1955]
- Tipulamima sophax (Druce, 1899)
- Tipulamima sylvestralis (Viette, [1955])
- Tipulamima tricincta (Le Cerf, 1916)
- Tipulamima xanthopimplaeformis (Viette, [1955])
