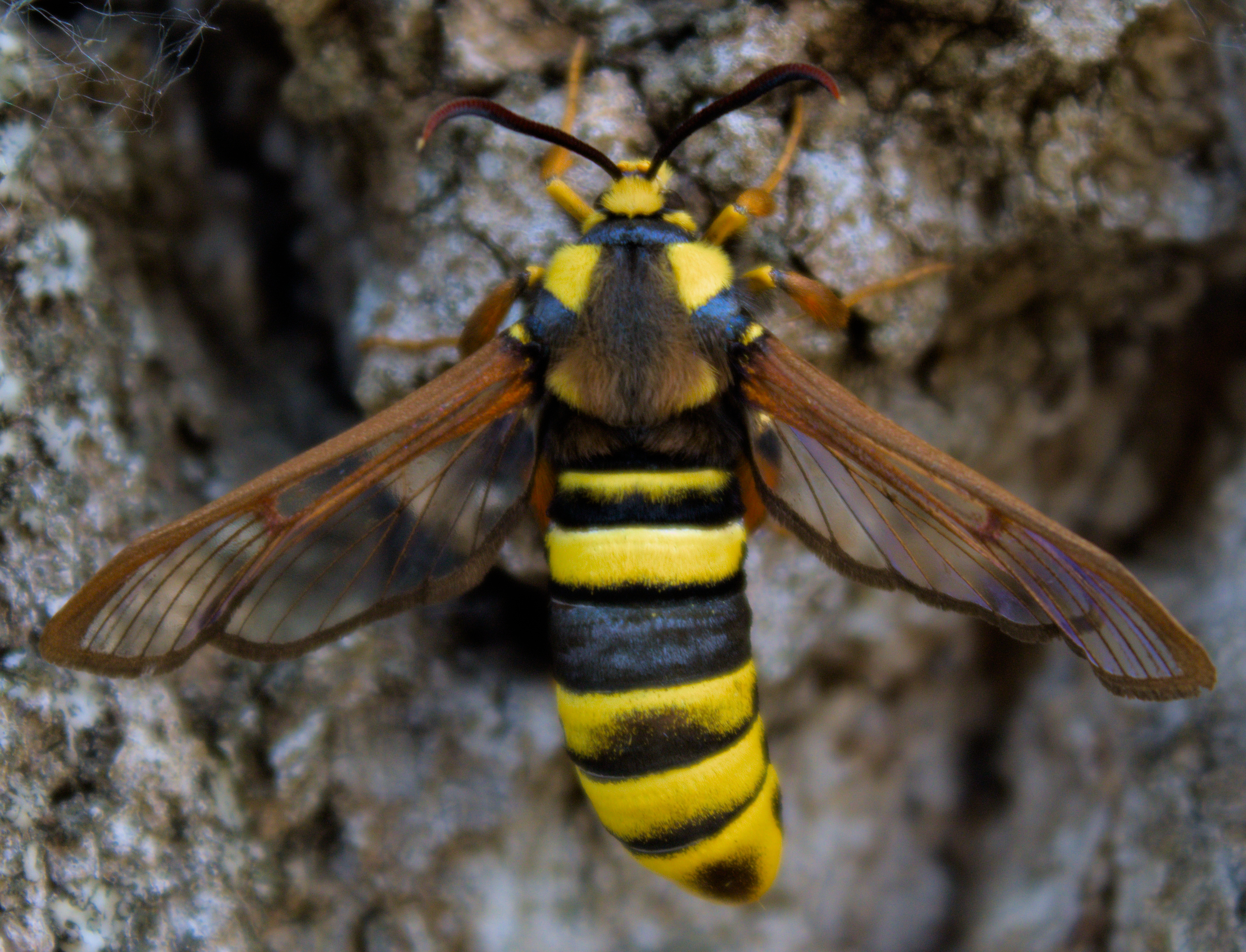

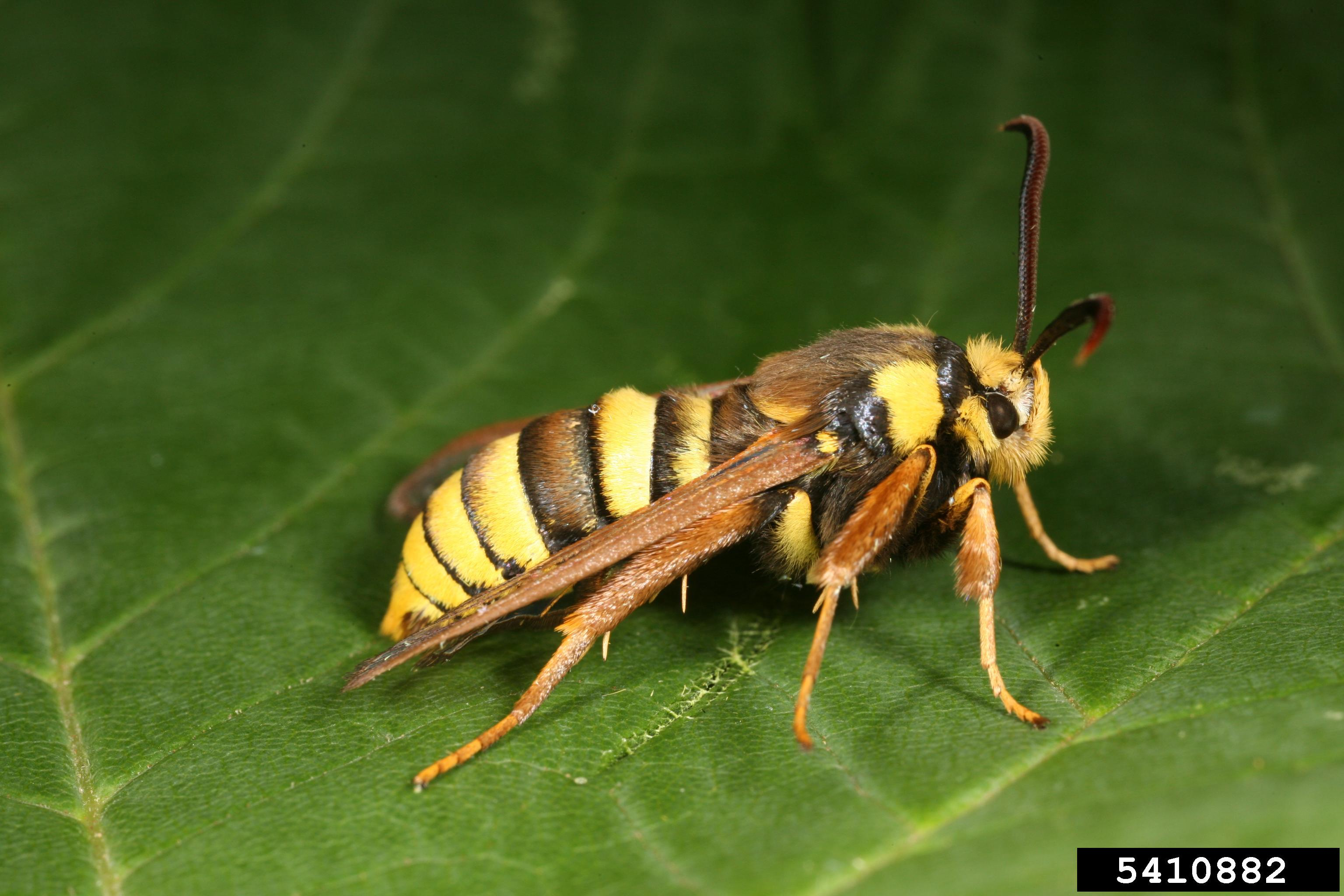

Scientific classification
- Kingdom: Animalia
- Phylum: Arthropoda
- Class: Insecta
- Order: Lepidoptera
- Family: Sesiidae
- Genus: Sesia
- Species: S. apiformis

Binomial name
- Sesia apiformis (Clerck, 1759)

Synonyms
- Sphinx apiformis Clerck, 1759 (nec Linnaeus, 1761, nec Hübner, 1796); Sphinx apiformis Linnaeus, 1761 (nec Hübner, 1796); Sphinx crabroniformis [Denis & Schiffermüller], 1775 (nec Fabricius, 1793, nec Lewin, 1797, nec Laspeyres, 1801); Sphinx sireciformis Esper, 1782; Sphinx tenebrioniformis Esper, 1782; Sphinx vespa Retzius, 1783; Trochilium apiformis f. brunneipes Turati, 1913; Trochilum apiformis ab. brunnea Caflisch, 1890; Trochilium apiformis ab. caflischii Standfuss, 1892; Aegeria apiformis ab. rhodani Mouterde, 1955

= Hornet moth =

Species of moth

The hornet moth or hornet clearwing (Sesia apiformis) is a large moth native to Europe and the Middle East and has been introduced to North America. Its protective coloration is an example of Batesian mimicry, as its similarity to a hornet makes it unappealing to predators. The hornet moth has been linked to the large dieback of poplar trees across Europe because its larvae bore into the trunk of the tree before re-emerging as adults.

== Geographic range ==
Sesia apiformis is found across mainland Europe, Great Britain, and in parts of the Middle East. It has also recently been introduced to America and Canada.

== Habitat ==
Adult hornet moths are often found in open habitat such as parks, golf courses, and marshy areas. Females prefer to lay eggs on old or isolated trees, especially trees surrounded by vegetation.

== Food resources ==
Larvae feed on host trees of several poplar species including Populus tremula and Populus nigra as well as Salix caprea. The moth also prefers to feed around trees surrounded by heavy vegetation. It was found that trees near this heavy vegetation suffered from a lot more infestation than those without the basal vegetation.

== Life history ==
=== Egg ===
Eggs of S. apiformis are brown and ovular in shape and have a major diameter of 0.43–0.85 mm. They are laid mostly around the base of an isolated tree or in surrounding vegetation. Since the female S. apiformis does not tend to disperse far from the tree from which she emerged, searching for a host plant is not a necessary step before oviposition. The female flies around the tree and continuously deposits eggs, laying from hundreds to thousands at a time. After depositing the eggs, the female flies away and does not return to care for the eggs or the larvae. It is evident when comparing the number of eggs produced to the number of adults that emerge each year that there is a large mortality between egg and adult stages. Therefore, the large number of eggs probably exhibits a trade-off for the female, with a large energy investment in developing eggs but no continued investment of parental care.

=== Larva ===
S. apiformis larvae hatch from September to May and spend two or three years in the larval stage, overwintering as larvae. The larvae are mostly found around the roots of host trees. Prior to pupating, the larvae bore up to ten centimeters into the trunk of the host tree leaving a thin layer of bark over the entrance to disguise the tunnel. Once inside the larva builds a cocoon from silk and excavated tree material.

=== Pupa ===
The pupa of S. apiformis are lined with rings of hard spines called adminicula that allow the pupa to maneuver through the bored tunnel in the tree. Males and females of the species have differing numbers of adminicula on the pupa and thus can be sexed prior to emergence as an adult. Additionally, female pupa are larger than those of males. Before the adult moth can emerge from the host tree, the pupa must make its way to the entrance of the tunnel. It does this by bending and straightening which causes the adminicula to catch on any indentations in the tree trunk and thus propels its way up the tunnel. It proceeds in this fashion until part of the pupa is protruding on the surface of the tree and stays in this position until the adult moth emerges.

=== Adult ===
Adults emerge between mid-June and July. Females spend the first few hours after emergence on the tree from which they emerged and typically do not fly until after they have mated. Conversely, males fly almost immediately after emergence and begin to look for a mate. Within seconds of emergence and prior to flying, adults expel liquid waste that can reach up to 70% of their body volume.

Adult hornet moths have clear wings that span 34–50 mm. Females and males both have yellow and black striped abdomens, but the number of stripes varies; females have two stripes whereas males have three. Females are on average larger than males.

== Enemies ==
The primary predators of S. apiformis are bird species such as magpies and great tits, which is unexpected given the moths Batesian mimicry, as these birds are not among the species that eat hornets. A likely explanation for this phenomenon is an absence of the model hornet, which would lead to a decreased efficacy of the mimicry. This could lead to the conspicuous coloration having the opposite intended effect once birds realize that the hornet moth is harmless and begin to seek it out.

== Protective coloration ==
The coloration of S. apiformis is an example of Batesian mimicry, as it resembles the coloration of hornets. The moth is as large as a hornet and even has the hornet's rather jerky flight when disturbed, but it has more yellow and lacks the waist between the abdomen and the thorax. This provides it protection from predators who want to avoid being stung and thus do not try to eat the moth.

== Mating ==
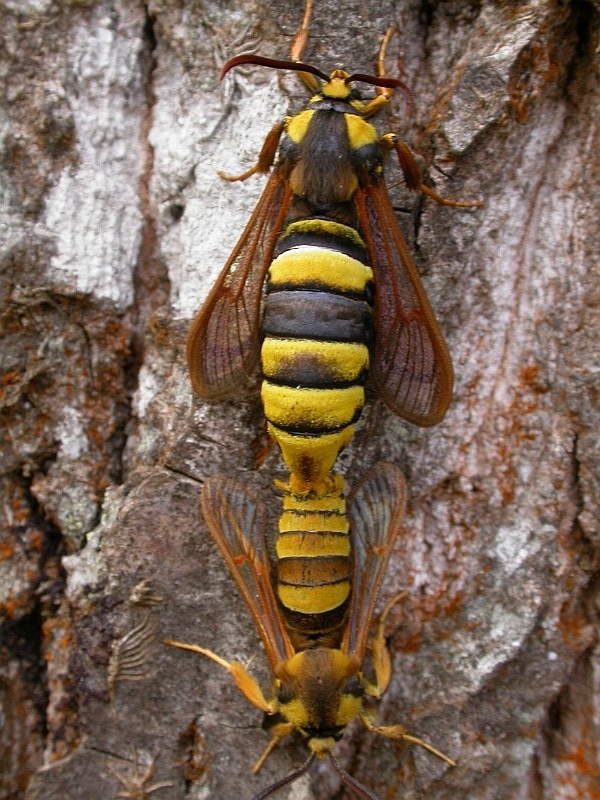
Copulation of Sesia apiformis. Female (above) is clearly larger than male (bottom) and differing number of stripes is apparent.

=== Mate searching ===
Female S. apiformis use specialized posterior glands to emit sex pheromones in order to attract potential mates. When the female is ready to mate, usually very soon after emerging from the pupae, she raises her abdomen and releases pheromones for several minutes at a time. The effectiveness of this calling is crucial for mating as the moths have only a short lifespan in which to mate and reproduce.

=== Female-Male interaction ===
The male S. apiformis does not appear to exhibit any courtship behavior; as soon as a male and female come into contact they are likely to begin mating. After the female has mated with one male, she will not wait to mate again. Each female usually mates several times before laying eggs. Males also do not appear to show a preference for virgin females as they will begin trying to mate with a female almost immediately after she has finished mating. Copulation is performed on the trunk of a tree with the female positioned above the male.

== Interactions with humans ==
=== Pest ===
Due to the large dieback of poplar trees across eastern United Kingdom and the association of boring larvae, S. apiformis has often been considered an agricultural pest. However, recent evidence suggests that the moth is not the primary driver of poplar tree dieback but rather increases the effects due to drought and human influence. Attempts to control the species have used the sex pheromones of S. apiformis females to create traps that attract individuals of the species.

=== Conservation ===
Populations of S. apiformis in the United Kingdom have shown evidence of decline over the past couple decades. While the adult forms are elusive and therefore have always been difficult to observe in the wild, the partially protruding pupae that are left after adult emergence provide a proxy for the number of moths in an ecosystem. In several sites around southern England where old exit holes were found, no new exit holes were found in trees, suggesting local population extinction. This coupled with the under-reporting of the species has led it to be classified as nationally scarce in the United Kingdom.

== Similar species ==
- British Isles Sesia bembeciformis (lunar hornet moth) smaller with black head and shoulders.
- Europe Eusphecia melanocephala Dalman 1816
- Europe Eusphecia pimplaeformis Oberthür 1872

== Gallery ==
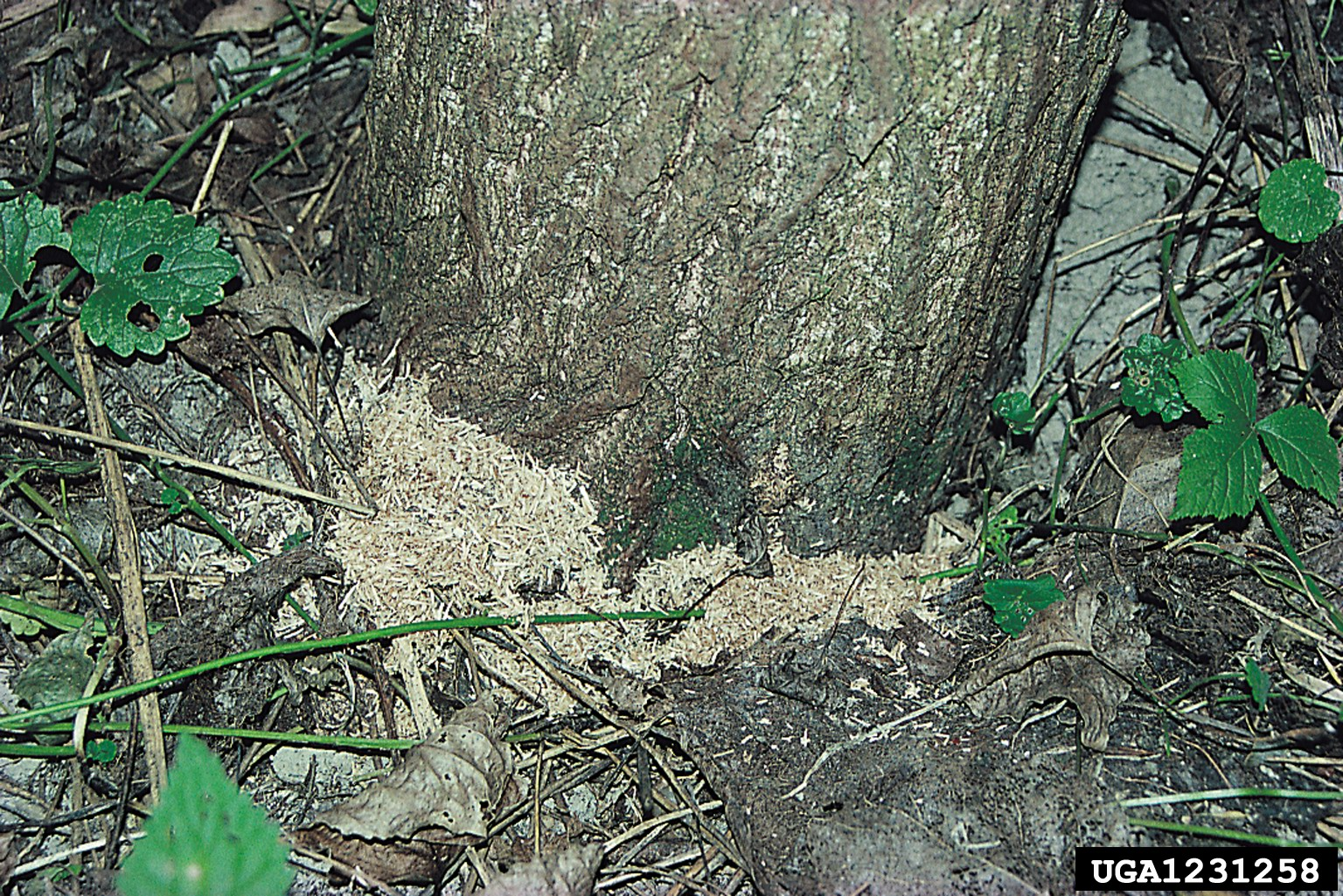
Damage

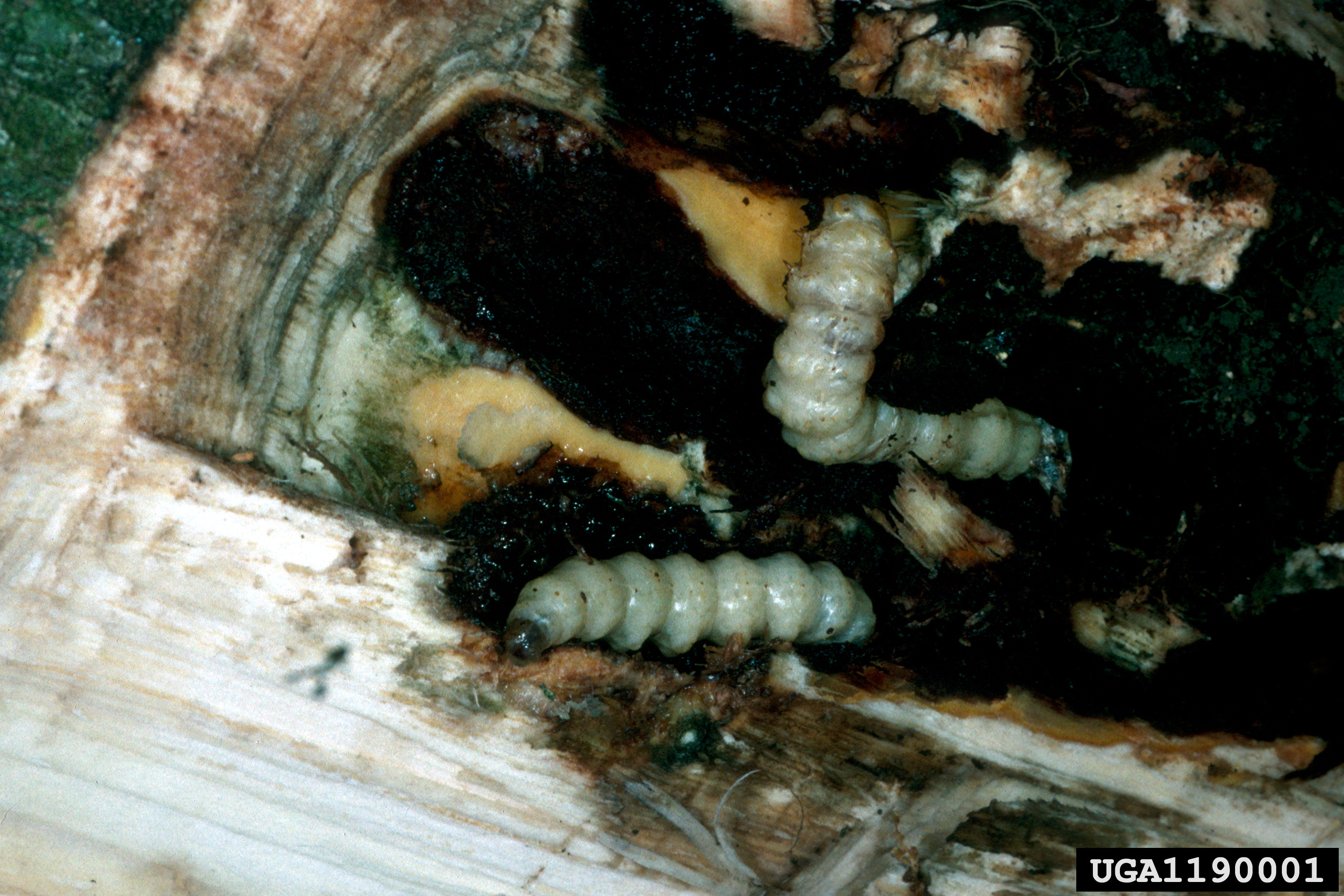
Larva

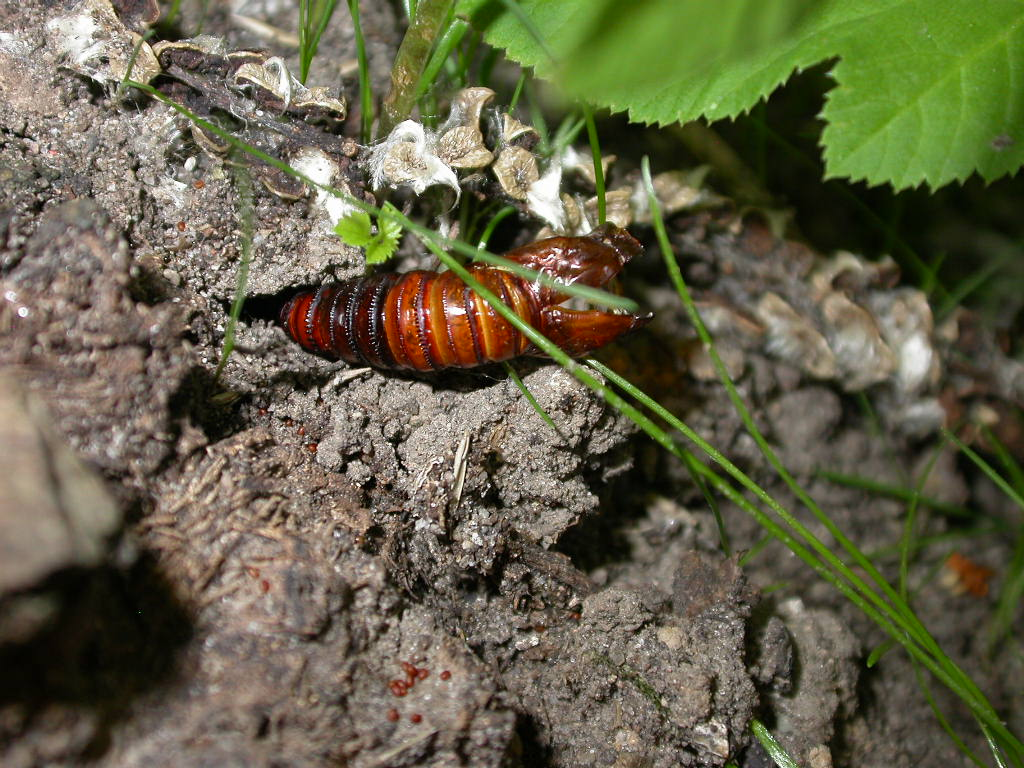
Pupa

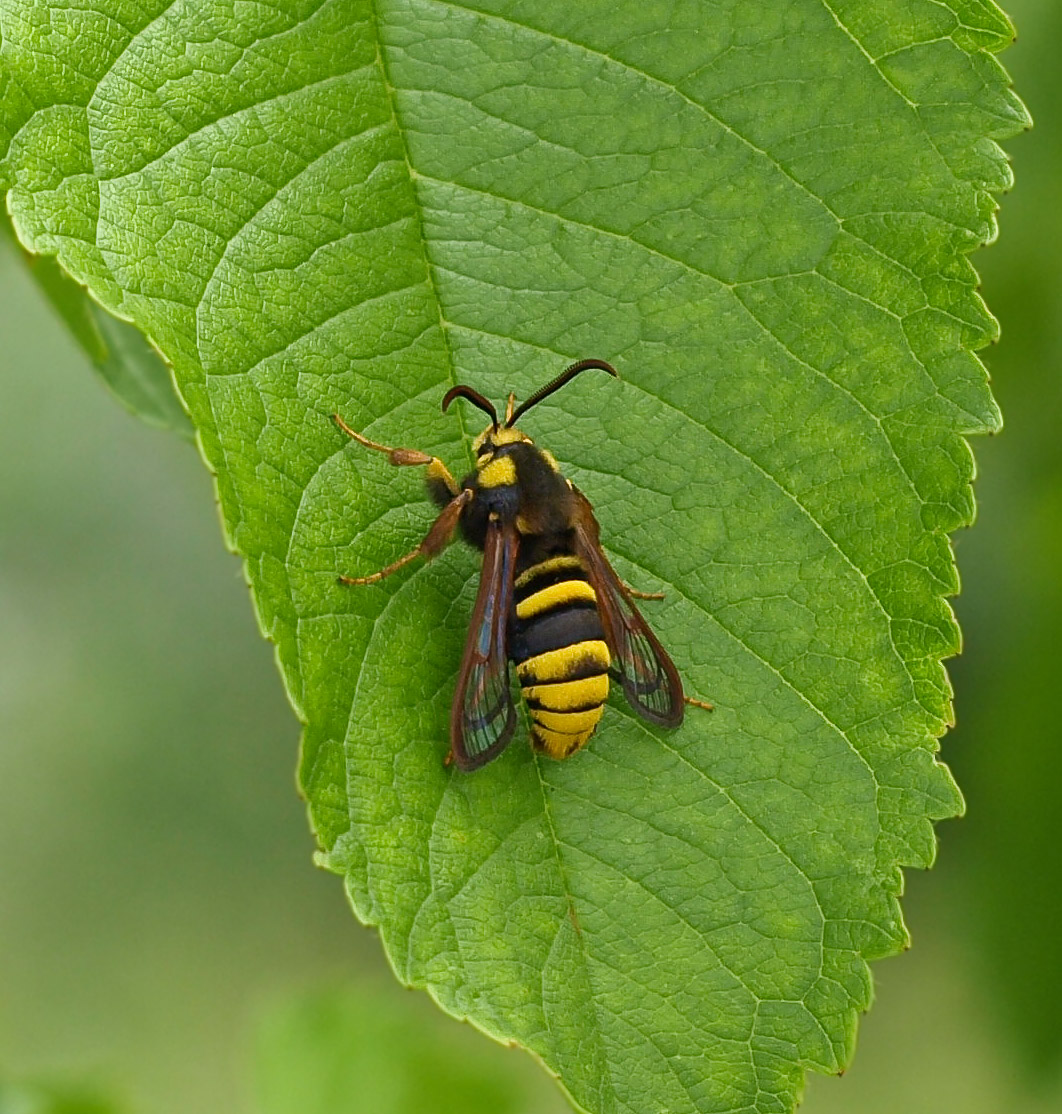
Adult Female

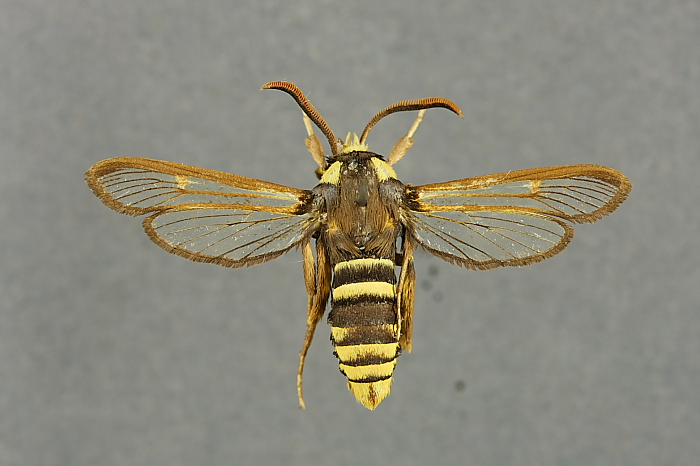
Adult Male

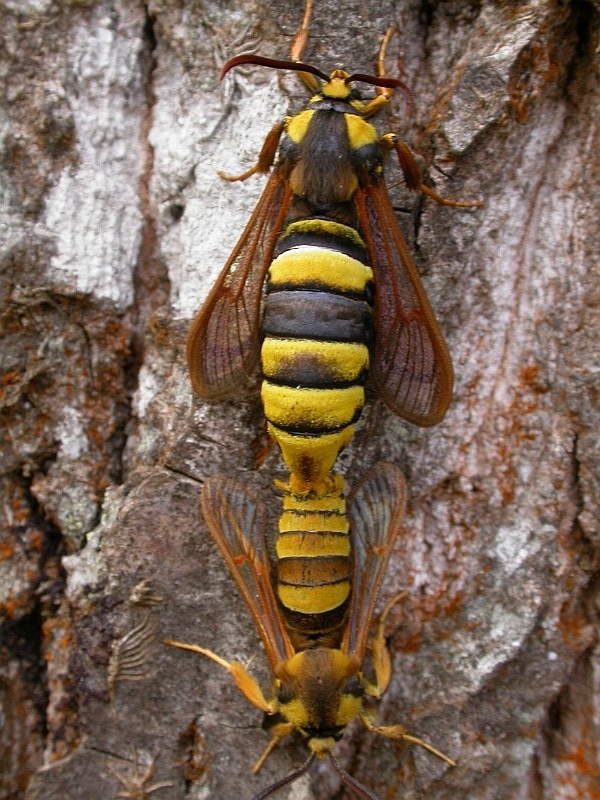
Mating

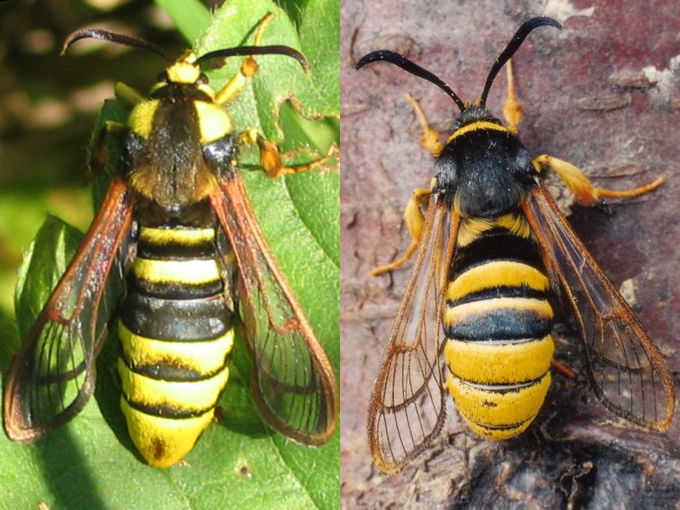
Sesia apiformis and S. bembeciformis side by side
