= Hummingbird moth =

Hummingbird moth is a common name for various species in the sphinx moth family, particularly:

- Macroglossum stellatarum, or hummingbird hawk-moth, native to Eurasia
- Hemaris thysbe, or hummingbird clearwing, native to North America
