= Camaegeria auripicta =

Scientific classification
- Kingdom: Animalia
- Phylum: Arthropoda
- Class: Insecta
- Order: Lepidoptera
- Family: Sesiidae
- Genus: Camaegeria
- Species: C. auripicta

Binomial name
- Camaegeria auripicta Strand, 1914

Species of moth

Camaegeria auripicta is a moth of the family Sesiidae. It is known from Cameroon.

This species has a wingspan of 19–25 mm, it is black, with greenish and blue-violet shine. It is close to Camaegeria aristura (Meyrick, 1931), Camaegeria monogama (Meyrick, 1932) and Camaegeria sophax (Druce, 1899)
