= Camaegeria monogama =

Scientific classification
- Kingdom: Animalia
- Phylum: Arthropoda
- Clade: Pancrustacea
- Class: Insecta
- Order: Lepidoptera
- Family: Sesiidae
- Genus: Camaegeria
- Species: C. monogama

Binomial name
- Camaegeria monogama (Meyrick, 1932)

Synonyms
- Aegeria monogama Meyrick, 1932; Macrotarsipus lioscelis Meyrick, 1935

Species of moth

Camaegeria monogama is a moth of the family Sesiidae. It is known from Sierra Leone.

This species is black and the tip of the abdomen has red-orange scales. It is similar to Camaegeria auripicta Strand, 1914, Camaegeria aristura (Meyrick, 1931) and Camaegeria sophax (Druce, 1899).

There is the possibility that this species is a junior synonym of Camaegeria exochiformis (Walker, 1856). This species is also native to Sierra Leone and its holotype is in very bad shape.
