= Camaegeria viettei =

Scientific classification
- Domain: Eukaryota
- Kingdom: Animalia
- Phylum: Arthropoda
- Class: Insecta
- Order: Lepidoptera
- Family: Sesiidae
- Genus: Camaegeria
- Species: C. viettei

Binomial name
- Camaegeria viettei Bartsch & Berg, 2012

Species of moth

Camaegeria viettei is a moth of the family Sesiidae. It is known from eastern Madagascar.

This species has a wingspan of 19.5mm. It is known only from the male holotype that was found in the region of Moramanga.
