= Tipulamima pyrosoma =

Scientific classification
- Kingdom: Animalia
- Phylum: Arthropoda
- Clade: Pancrustacea
- Class: Insecta
- Order: Lepidoptera
- Family: Sesiidae
- Genus: Tipulamima
- Species: T. pyrosoma

Binomial name
- Tipulamima pyrosoma Hampson, 1919

Species of moth

Tipulamima pyrosoma is a moth of the family Sesiidae. It is known from Uganda.
