= Tipulamima flavifrons =

Scientific classification
- Kingdom: Animalia
- Phylum: Arthropoda
- Class: Insecta
- Order: Lepidoptera
- Family: Sesiidae
- Genus: Tipulamima
- Species: T. flavifrons

Binomial name
- Tipulamima flavifrons Holland, 1893

Species of moth

Tipulamima flavifrons is a moth of the family Sesiidae. It is known from Gabon.
