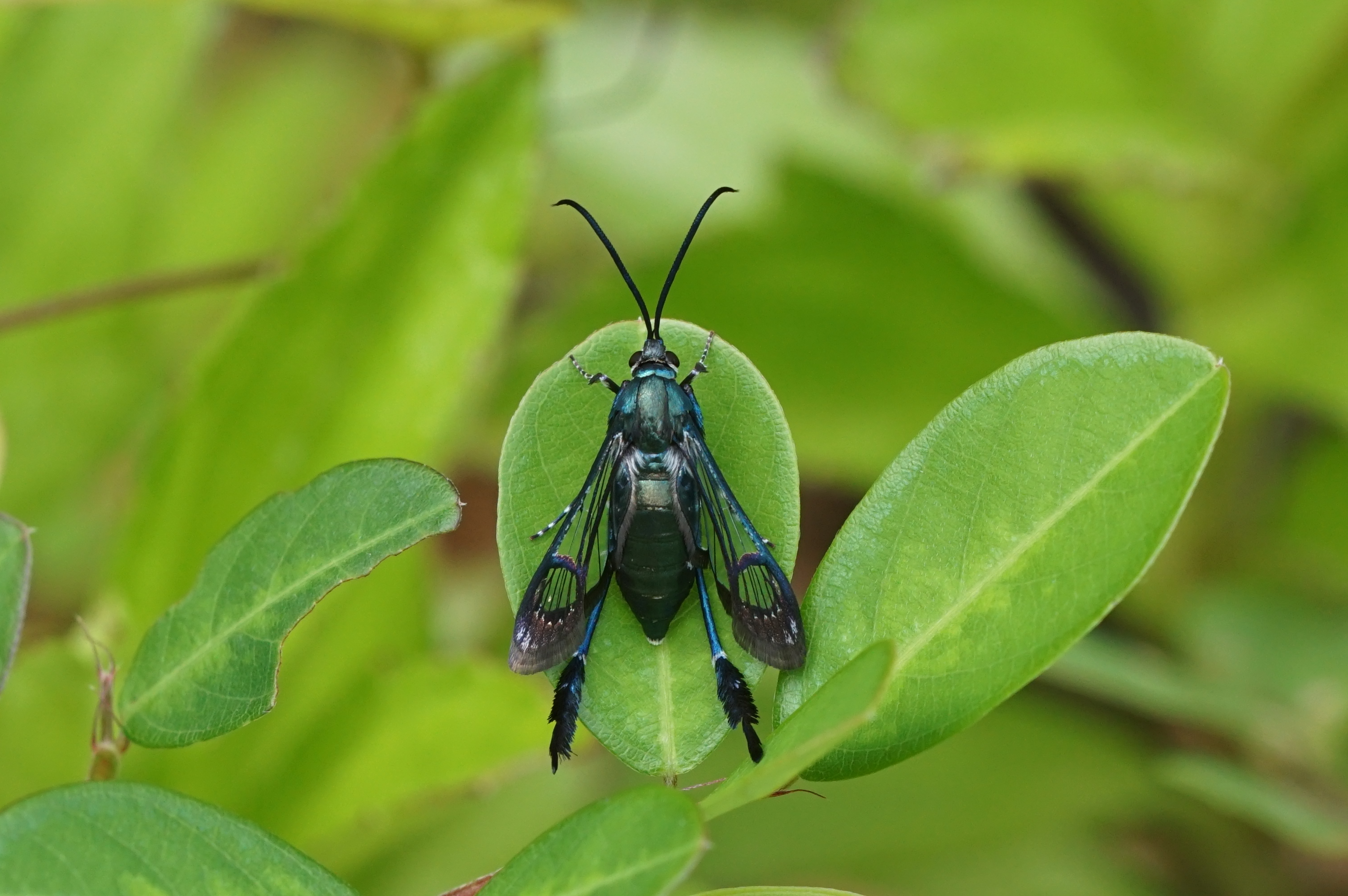

Scientific classification
- Kingdom: Animalia
- Phylum: Arthropoda
- Class: Insecta
- Order: Lepidoptera
- Family: Sesiidae
- Tribe: Synanthedonini
- Genus: Macrotarsipus; Hampson, [1893]

Species
- See text

= Macrotarsipus =

Genus of moths

Macrotarsipus is a genus of moths in the family Sesiidae.

== Species ==
- Macrotarsipus albipunctus Hampson, [1893]
- Macrotarsipus similis Arita & Gorbunov, 1995
- Macrotarsipus africanus (Beutenmüller, 1899)
- Macrotarsipus lioscelis Meyrick, 1935
- Macrotarsipus microthyris Hampson, 1919
