= Camaegeria lychnitis =

Scientific classification
- Domain: Eukaryota
- Kingdom: Animalia
- Phylum: Arthropoda
- Class: Insecta
- Order: Lepidoptera
- Family: Sesiidae
- Genus: Camaegeria
- Species: C. lychnitis

Binomial name
- Camaegeria lychnitis Bartsch & Berg, 2012

Species of moth

Camaegeria lychnitis is a moth of the family Sesiidae. It is known from Madagascar.

This species has a wingspan of 15–17.5mm. The holotype and most paratypes provided from the region of Moramanga and Andasibe from an altitude range between 1000 and 1150m. Most of them were caught in disturbed primary forests.

This species can be distinguished from other species of this genus by its red anal tuft.
