= Tipulamima opalimargo =

Scientific classification
- Domain: Eukaryota
- Kingdom: Animalia
- Phylum: Arthropoda
- Class: Insecta
- Order: Lepidoptera
- Family: Sesiidae
- Genus: Tipulamima
- Species: T. opalimargo

Binomial name
- Tipulamima opalimargo (Le Cerf, 1913)

Synonyms
- Sesia opalimargo Le Cerf, 1913

Species of moth

Tipulamima opalimargo is a moth of the family Sesiidae. It is known from Madagascar.
