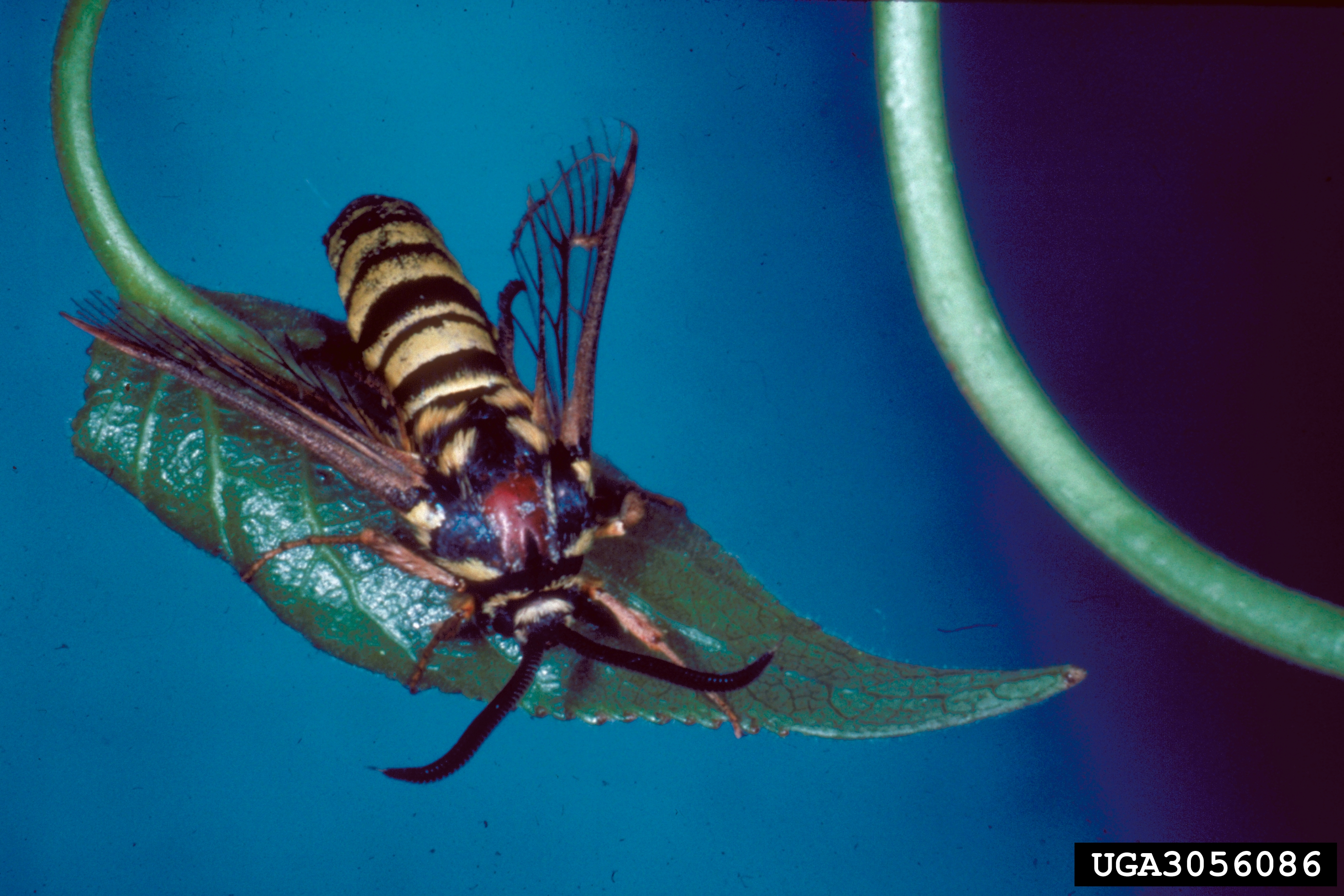

Scientific classification
- Domain: Eukaryota
- Kingdom: Animalia
- Phylum: Arthropoda
- Class: Insecta
- Order: Lepidoptera
- Family: Sesiidae
- Genus: Sesia
- Species: S. tibialis

Binomial name
- Sesia tibialis (Harris, 1839)

Synonyms
- Trochilium tibialis Harris, 1839; Melittia flavitibia Walker, 1856 (unnecessary replacement name); Trochilium pacificum Edwards, 1881; Trochilium californicum Neumoegen, 1891; Trochilium minimum Neumoegen, 1891; Aegeria tibialis var. dyari Cockerell, 1908; Aegeria tibialis var. anonyma Strand, 1925; Aegeria tibialis var. melanoformis Engelhardt, 1946

= Sesia tibialis =

Species of moth

Sesia tibialis, the American hornet moth, poplar clearwing borer or cottonwood crown borer, is a moth of the family Sesiidae. It is known from North America, including British Columbia, Colorado, Utah, Michigan, Montana, Washington, California and Arizona.

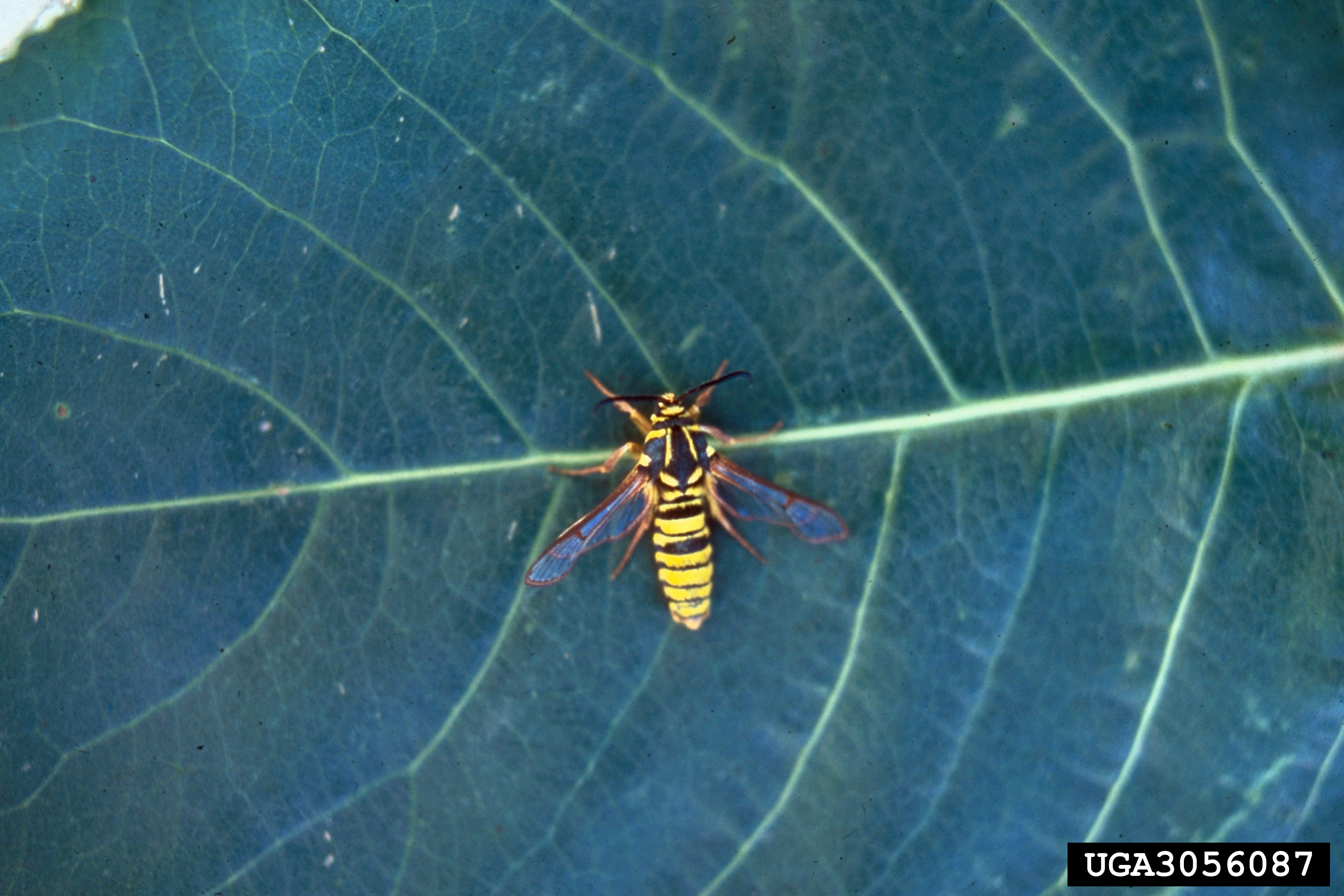

Adults resemble hornets.
