= Macrotarsipus microthyris =

Scientific classification
- Kingdom: Animalia
- Phylum: Arthropoda
- Class: Insecta
- Order: Lepidoptera
- Family: Sesiidae
- Genus: Macrotarsipus
- Species: M. microthyris

Binomial name
- Macrotarsipus microthyris Hampson, 1919

Species of moth

Macrotarsipus microthyris is a moth of the family Sesiidae. It is known from Kenya and Malawi.
