= Macrotarsipus africana =

Scientific classification
- Domain: Eukaryota
- Kingdom: Animalia
- Phylum: Arthropoda
- Class: Insecta
- Order: Lepidoptera
- Family: Sesiidae
- Genus: Macrotarsipus
- Species: M. africana

Binomial name
- Macrotarsipus africana (Beutenmüller, 1899)

Synonyms
- Sesia africana Beutenmüller, 1899; Aegeria belia Druce, 1910; Macrotarsipus africanus Beutenmüller, 1899

Species of moth

Macrotarsipus africana is a moth of the family Sesiidae described by William Beutenmüller in 1899. It is known from Cameroon, Equatorial Guinea and Gabon.
