= Tipulamima grandidieri =

Scientific classification
- Domain: Eukaryota
- Kingdom: Animalia
- Phylum: Arthropoda
- Class: Insecta
- Order: Lepidoptera
- Family: Sesiidae
- Genus: Tipulamima
- Species: T. grandidieri

Binomial name
- Tipulamima grandidieri (Le Cerf, 1917)

Synonyms
- Macrotarsipodes grandidieri Le Cerf, 1917

Species of moth

Tipulamima grandidieri is a moth of the family Sesiidae. It is known from Madagascar.
