= Tipulamima nigriceps =

Scientific classification
- Kingdom: Animalia
- Phylum: Arthropoda
- Class: Insecta
- Order: Lepidoptera
- Family: Sesiidae
- Genus: Tipulamima
- Species: T. nigriceps

Binomial name
- Tipulamima nigriceps Hampson, 1919

Species of moth

Tipulamima nigriceps is a moth of the family Sesiidae. It is known from Sierra Leone.
