= Camaegeria xanthomos =

Scientific classification
- Domain: Eukaryota
- Kingdom: Animalia
- Phylum: Arthropoda
- Class: Insecta
- Order: Lepidoptera
- Family: Sesiidae
- Genus: Camaegeria
- Species: C. xanthomos

Binomial name
- Camaegeria xanthomos Bartsch & Berg, 2012

Species of moth

Camaegeria xanthomos is a moth of the family Sesiidae first described by Daniel Bartsch and Jutta Berg in 2012. It is known from eastern Madagascar.

This species has a wingspan of 22 millimetres (0.87 in) and it is similar to Camaegeria polytelis and Camaegeria sylvestralis. The holotype, provided from the region of Moramanga and Andasibe in Madagascar, was caught in disturbed primary forests.
