= Camaegeria aristura =

Scientific classification
- Kingdom: Animalia
- Phylum: Arthropoda
- Class: Insecta
- Order: Lepidoptera
- Family: Sesiidae
- Genus: Camaegeria
- Species: C. aristura

Binomial name
- Camaegeria aristura (Meyrick, 1931)

Synonyms
- Tipulomima aristura Meyrick, 1931; Tipulamima aristura Meyrick, 1931; Aegeria leptomorpha Meyrick, 1931; Aegeria hadassa Meyrick, 1932

Species of moth

Camaegeria aristura is a moth of the family Sesiidae. It is known from Uganda.

This species is black and the tip of the abdomen has red-orange scales. It is similar to Camaegeria auripicta Strand, 1914, Camaegeria monogama (Meyrick, 1932) and Camaegeria sophax (Druce, 1899)
