= Tipulamima flammipes =

Scientific classification
- Kingdom: Animalia
- Phylum: Arthropoda
- Class: Insecta
- Order: Lepidoptera
- Family: Sesiidae
- Genus: Tipulamima
- Species: T. flammipes

Binomial name
- Tipulamima flammipes (Hampson, 1910)

Synonyms
- Macrotarsipes flammipes Hampson, 1910

Species of moth

Tipulamima flammipes is a moth of the family Sesiidae. It is known from Uganda.
