= Camaegeria =

Scientific classification
- Domain: Eukaryota
- Kingdom: Animalia
- Phylum: Arthropoda
- Class: Insecta
- Order: Lepidoptera
- Family: Sesiidae
- Tribe: Synanthedonini
- Genus: Camaegeria; Strand, 1914

Type species
- Camaegeria auripicta Strand, 1914

Genus of moths

Camaegeria is a genus of moths in the family Sesiidae. The genus was erected by Embrik Strand in 1914.

== Species ==
Species of this genus are:

- Camaegeria aristura (Meyrick, 1931)
- Camaegeria auripicta Strand, 1914
- Camaegeria exochiformis (Walker, 1856)
- Camaegeria lychnitis Bartsch & Berg, 2012
- Camaegeria massai Bartsch & Berg, 2012
- Camaegeria monogama (Meyrick, 1932)
- Camaegeria polytelis Bartsch & Berg, 2012
- Camaegeria sophax (Druce, 1899)
- Camaegeria sylvestralis (Viette, 1955)
- Camaegeria viettei Bartsch & Berg, 2012
- Camaegeria xanthomos Bartsch & Berg, 2012
- Camaegeria xanthopimplaeformis (Viette, 1956)
