= Tipulamima ivondro =

Scientific classification
- Kingdom: Animalia
- Phylum: Arthropoda
- Class: Insecta
- Order: Lepidoptera
- Family: Sesiidae
- Genus: Tipulamima
- Species: T. ivondro

Binomial name
- Tipulamima ivondro Viette, [1955]

Species of moth

Tipulamima ivondro is a moth of the family Sesiidae. It is known from Madagascar.

This species has a wingspan of 31 mm, with a length of the forewings of 14 mm. The forewings are almost completely hyaline (glass like), with the cell a little yellowish. The edge and a narrow transversal line of the forewings are blackish. The hindewings are hyaline with a little yellowish touch in the cell.

The holotype was collected by A.Seyrig north of Fort-Dauphin, in south-eastern Madagascar.
