= Tipulamima haugi =

Scientific classification
- Kingdom: Animalia
- Phylum: Arthropoda
- Class: Insecta
- Order: Lepidoptera
- Family: Sesiidae
- Genus: Tipulamima
- Species: T. haugi

Binomial name
- Tipulamima haugi (Le Cerf, 1917)

Synonyms
- Macrotarsipodes haugi Le Cerf, 1917

Species of moth

Tipulamima haugi is a moth of the family Sesiidae. It is known from Gabon.
