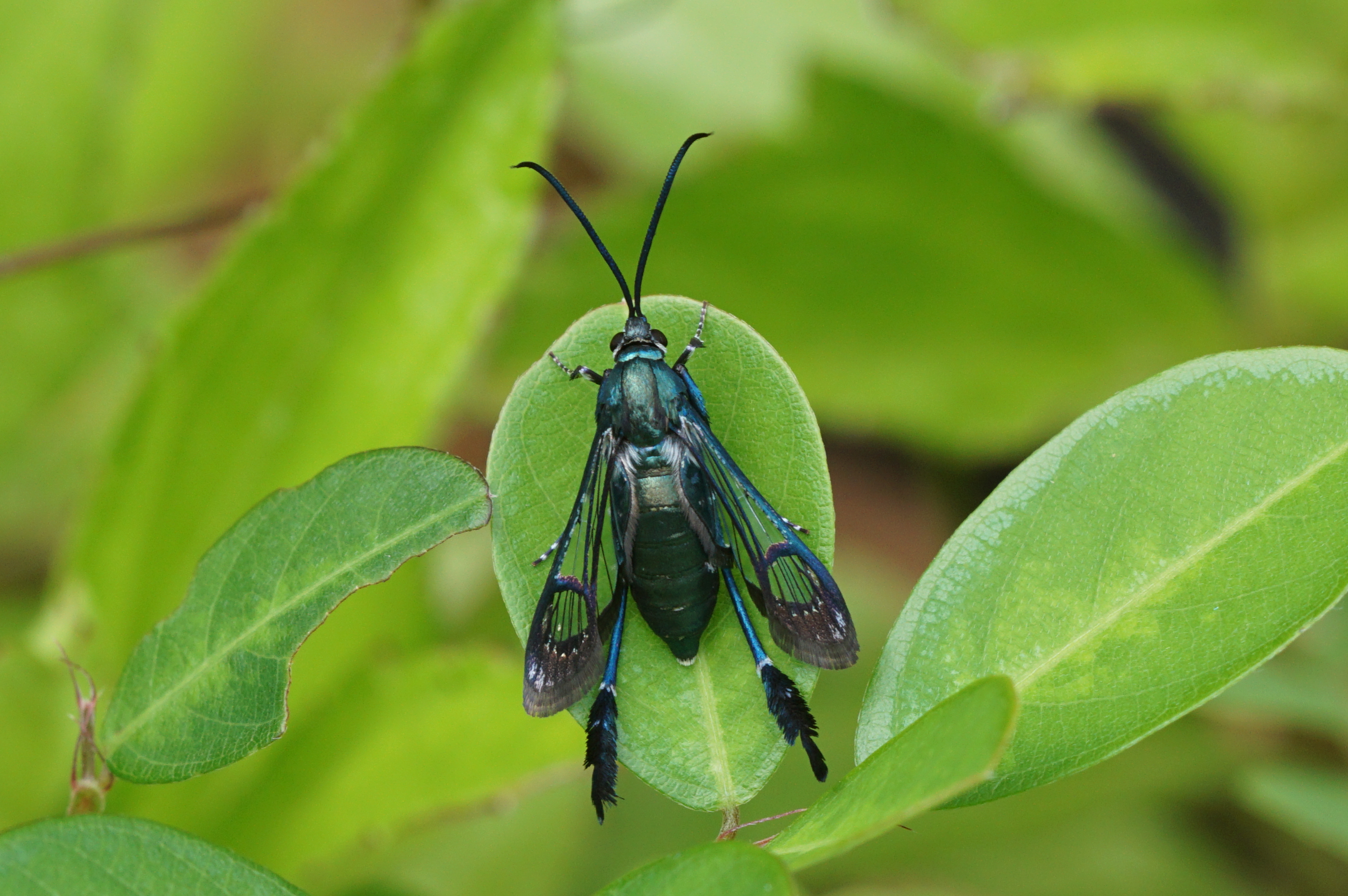

Scientific classification
- Kingdom: Animalia
- Phylum: Arthropoda
- Clade: Pancrustacea
- Class: Insecta
- Order: Lepidoptera
- Family: Sesiidae
- Genus: Macrotarsipus
- Species: M. similis

Binomial name
- Macrotarsipus similis Arita & Gorbunov, 1995

= Macrotarsipus similis =

Species of moth

Macrotarsipus similis is a moth of the family Sesiidae. It is known from Thailand and Indonesia (Java). The habitat consists of dark tropical jungle.

The wingspan is 18–18.5 mm. Adults have been recorded in mid-August and October in Thailand and in mid-March on Java.
