= Tipulamima seyrigi =

Scientific classification
- Kingdom: Animalia
- Phylum: Arthropoda
- Class: Insecta
- Order: Lepidoptera
- Family: Sesiidae
- Genus: Tipulamima
- Species: T. seyrigi

Binomial name
- Tipulamima seyrigi Viette, [1955]

Species of moth

Tipulamima seyrigi is a moth of the family Sesiidae. It is known from Madagascar.

The wingspan of this species is 33 mm with a length of the forewings of 15-15.5 mm. The forewings are hyaline (glass like) in the cell and yellowish grey at the costa. This species was named after A.Seyrig who collected the holotype in Bekily, southern Madagascar
