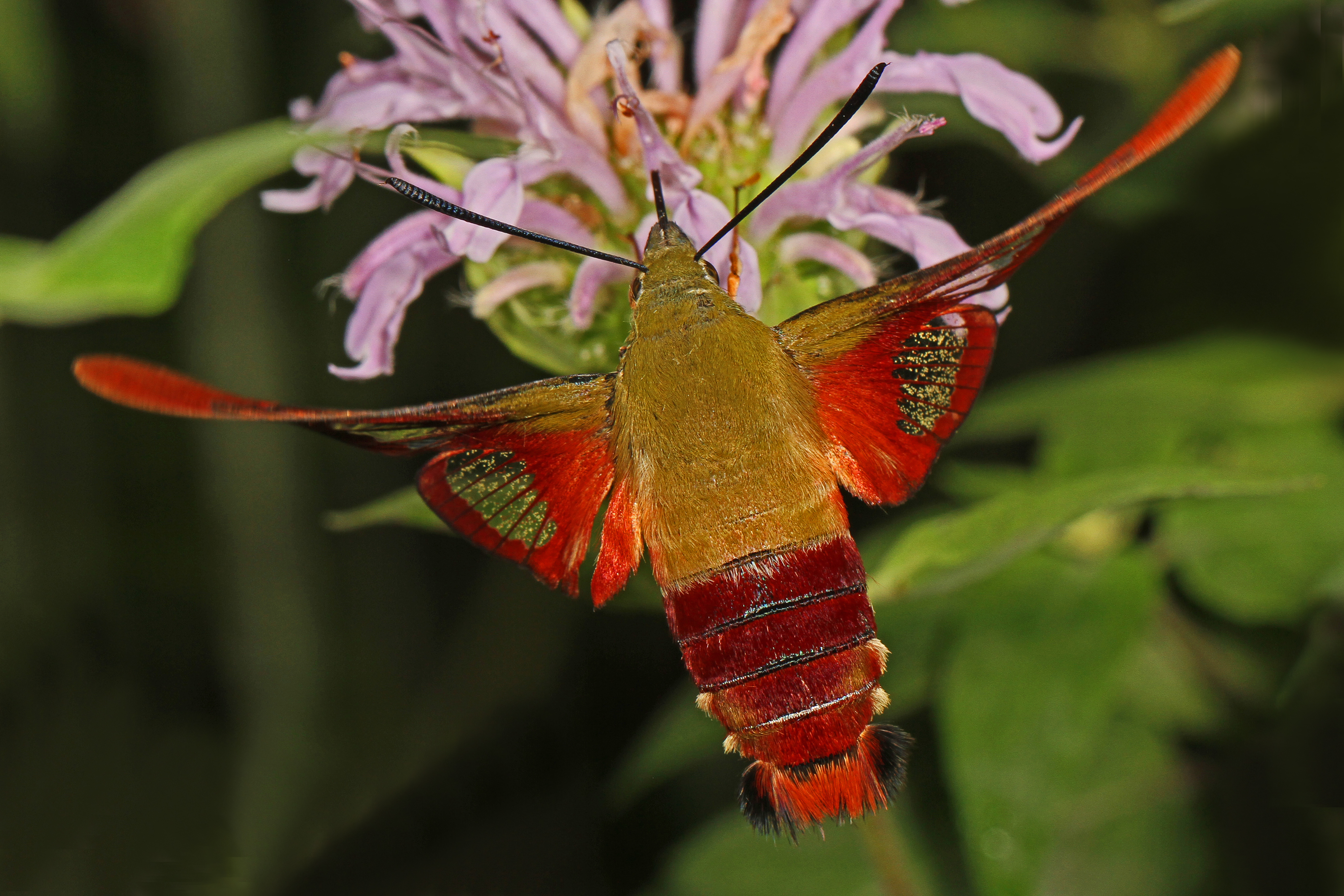
- Feeding adult
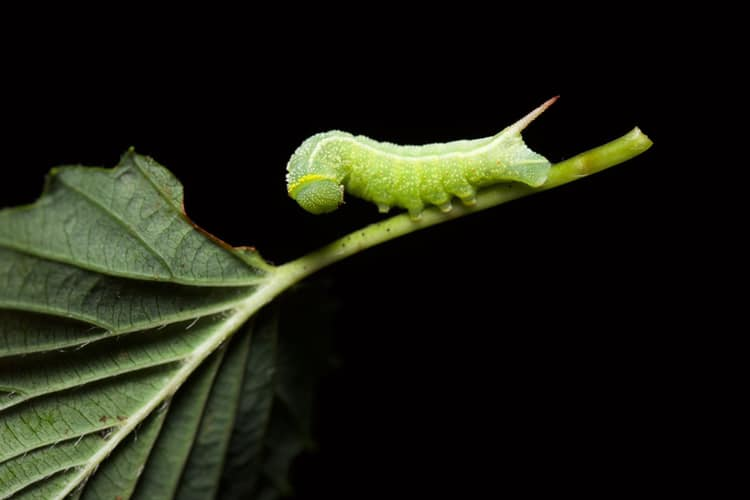
- Larva

Scientific classification
- Kingdom: Animalia
- Phylum: Arthropoda
- Class: Insecta
- Order: Lepidoptera
- Family: Sphingidae
- Genus: Hemaris
- Species: H. thysbe

Binomial name
- Hemaris thysbe (Fabricius, 1775)

Synonyms
- Sesia thysbe Fabricius, 1775; Haemorrhagia buffaloensis Grote & Robinson, 1867; Haemorrhagia floridensis Grote & Robinson, 1867; Macroglossa etolus Boisduval, 1875; Macroglossa pyramus Boisduval, 1875; Sesia cimbiciformis Stephens, 1828; Sesia fuscicaudis Walker, 1856; Sesia ruficaudis Kirby, 1837; Sesia uniformis Grote, 1868; Sphinx pelasgus Cramer, 1779

= Hemaris thysbe =

Hummingbird clearwing

Species of moth

Hemaris thysbe, the hummingbird clearwing, is a moth of the family Sphingidae (hawkmoths). Coloration varies between individuals, but typically the moth is olive green and burgundy on its back, and white or yellow and burgundy on the underside. Its wings are transparent with a reddish-brown border. It has light-colored legs, which combined with the lack of striping on the underside is diagnostic. Beating its wings rapidly, H. thysbe hovers to collect nectar from a variety of flowers. The combination of its appearance and its behavior commonly leads to it being confused with a hummingbird or bumblebee.

Hemaris thysbe is found in a large portion of North America, with a range extending from Alaska to Oregon in the west and from Newfoundland to Florida in the east. It is a migratory species and is most common in southern Ontario and the eastern United States. H. thysbe has two broods a year in the southern portion of its range, but only one in the north. As a caterpillar, it feeds on honeysuckle, dogbane, and several types of fruit trees.

Due to the variable appearance of H. thysbe, it has often been mistakenly described as multiple distinct species. It was first described by Johan Christian Fabricius in 1775. The moth is a flower pollinator.

== Description ==
The body of an adult Hemaris thysbe moth is spindle shaped, and is largely covered by a thick coat of fur. There is significant variation in coloration between individuals. Typically, the back side of the moth is olive to golden-olive on the thorax and burgundy to black with light olive to dark golden patches on the abdomen. The underside of the moth is white to yellow on the thorax and burgundy to black on the abdomen. When it first hatches, the wings of H. thysbe are dark red to black. As it begins to fly, scales fall off leaving a mostly clear wing with reddish-brown borders and veins. The width and shape of the border as well as the patterning of the veins vary between individuals. The moth beats its wings quite rapidly and has a wingspan of 4 to 5.5 centimetres (1.6 to 2.2 in). H. thysbe has light-colored, often yellow legs. In general, southern broods and individuals hatched later in the season are darker in color. Southern and eastern populations generally exhibit jagged wing borders, while northern and western ones are usually smooth.

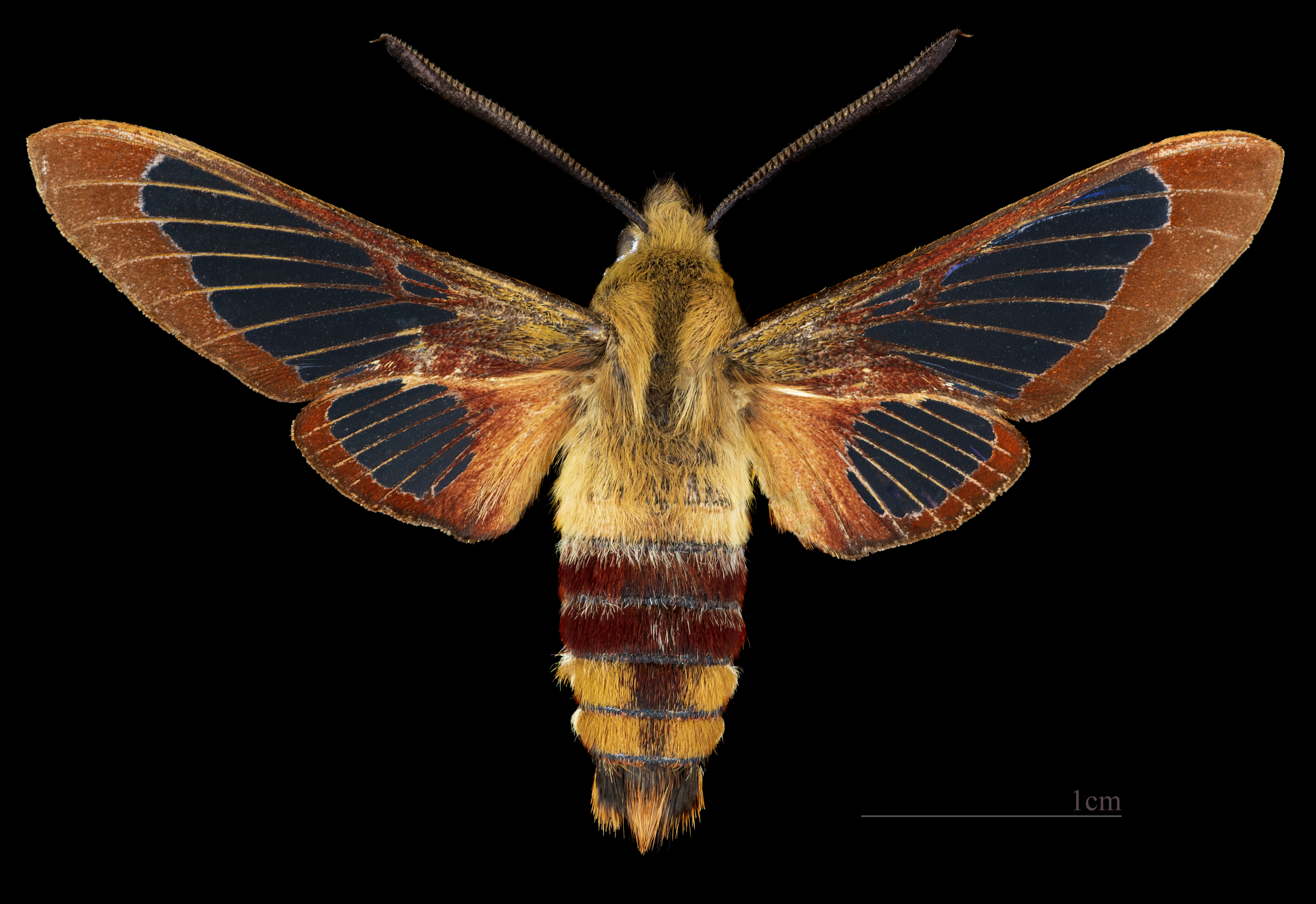
Hemaris thysbe ♂

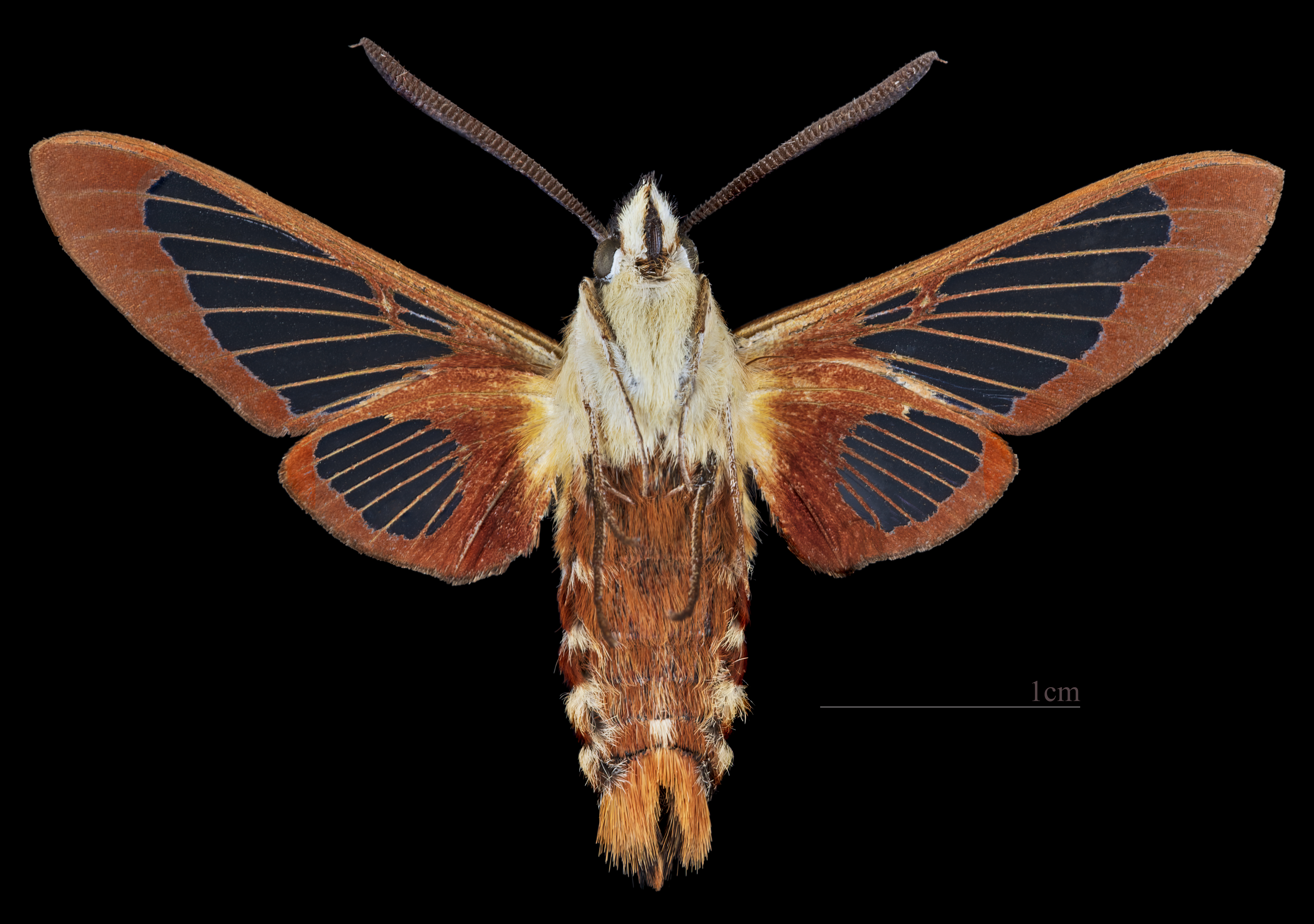
Hemaris thysbe ♂ △

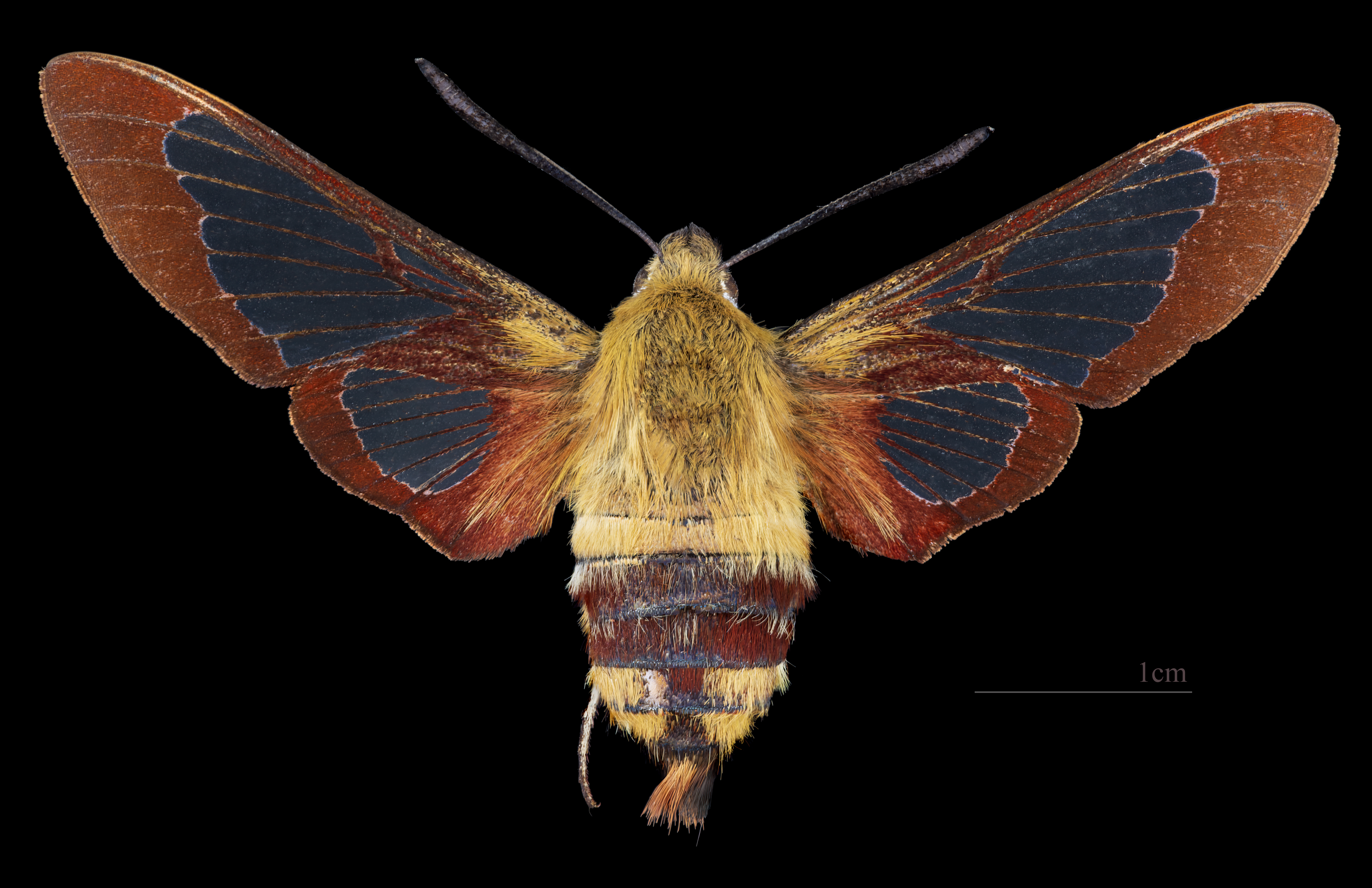
Hemaris thysbe ♀

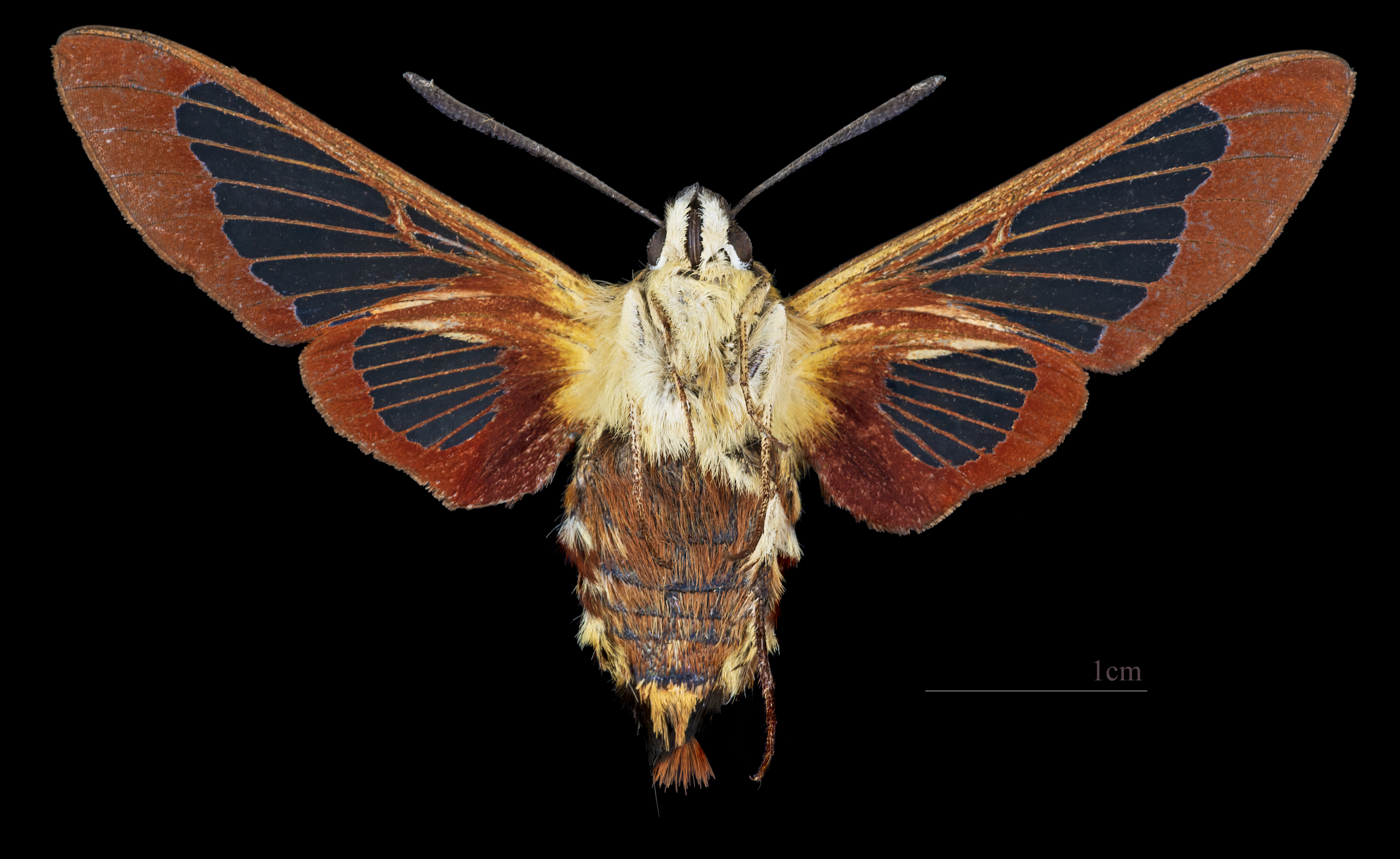
Hemaris thysbe ♀ △

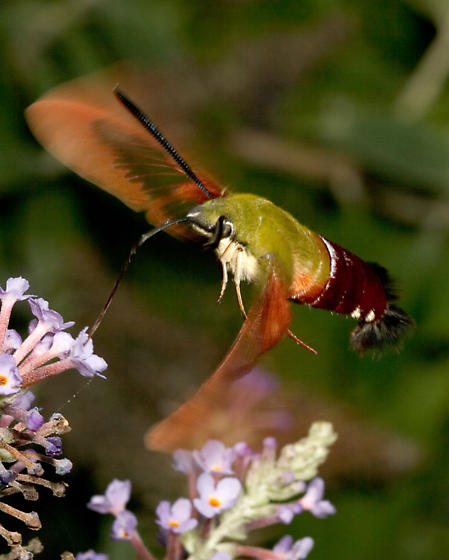
Hemaris thysbe extends its long proboscis to feed from a flower.

The antennae of H. thysbe are thicker at their base and are curved at the ends. Unlike most moths, the species lacks hearing organs. It has compound eyes and well-developed reproductive organs. Hemaris thysbe can be distinguished from Hemaris gracilis and Hemaris diffinis by the lack of stripes on the underside of its thorax and by its pale legs. (Legs are reddish in H. gracilis and black in H. diffinis.) The H. thysbe caterpillar is yellowish green with bands of dark green and reddish brown to dark brown. It has a granulose body with small, white spots and a white horn projecting from its posterior.

As a caterpillar, H. thysbe feeds on cherry trees, European cranberry bush, hawthorns, dogbane, honeysuckle, and snowberry. It burrows into the soil to overwinter as a brown, hard-shelled pupa. In the late spring, it emerges as an adult moth. H. thysbe lays green eggs on the underside of plant leaves, which hatch in about a week. Development takes four weeks, after which the caterpillar spins a cocoon at ground level. Two to four weeks later a moth emerges for a second breeding cycle before summer's end in southern climates. In northern climates, H. thysbe has a single mating cycle per year.

The mating and other behavioral habits of H. thysbe have not been well studied. Adults are most active during the hottest parts of the day, but remain active until sunset. H. thysbe collects nectar from a wide variety of flowers using a long (19–21 millimetres [0.75–0.83 in]) proboscis while hovering above the bloom. It shows a preference for pink and purple flowers, moving rapidly from one flower to the next. The moth is considered to be a hummingbird mimic and is frequently mistaken for the bird or for a bumblebee.

== Habitat and range ==
Hemaris thysbe lives in second-growth forest, in meadows, and is commonly found in cultivated gardens of suburbia. H. thysbe is a migratory species, capable of traveling long distances. In single brood regions, adults are found throughout the summer. In the south, adults are present from March to June and from August to October.

H. thysbe is most abundant in the eastern United States and southern Ontario. Its range extends eastward to Newfoundland and westward to Texas, the Great Plains, and into Manitoba, Saskatchewan and Alberta. On the west coast of North America, its range extends from Oregon, up to the Yukon Territory and Alaska. It has minimal economic impact to humans, acting neither as a crop pollinator nor as a pest. The moth does, however, pollinate several cultivated flowers, and is the primary pollinator for some species of orchid. H. thysbe is not endangered or threatened.

== Taxonomic history ==
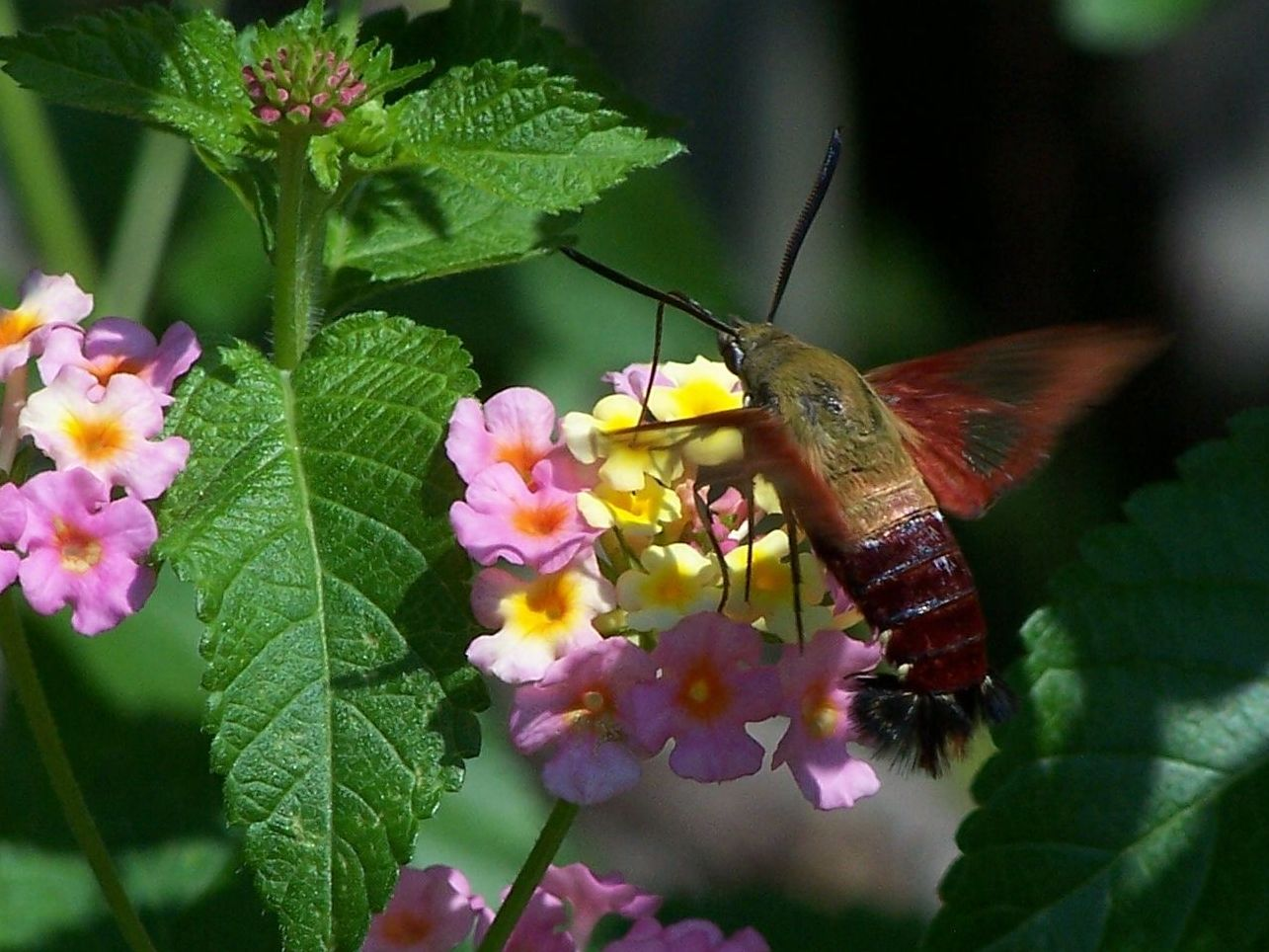
Hemaris thysbe hovers over a flower while feeding.

Hemaris thysbe was first described by Johan Christian Fabricius in 1775 as Sesia thysbe in his Systema Entomologiae. The specific name is likely a reference to Thisbe, half of a pair of ill-fated lovers in Ovid's Metamorphoses. The name thus associates the blood-stained scarf of Thisbe to the reddish-brown coloration of the moth.

Due to the variable coloration and wing patterning of H. thysbe, it, along with other members of Hermaris, were described as many different species during the 1800s. In 1971, entomologist Ronald Hodges examined the various forms in detail. He dissected a number of specimens representing the range of H. thysbe's coloration and geographic scope and found no differences in their reproductive organs. He thus concluded that the many variations represent a single species. Species collapsed into H. thysbe include:

- Sphinx pelasgus Cramer, 1780
- Sesia cimbiciformis Stephens, 1828
- Sesia ruficaudis Kirby, 1837
- Sesia fuscicaudis Walker, 1856
- Haemorrhagia buffaloensis Grote & Robinson, 1867
- Haemorrhagia floridensis Grote & Robinson, 1867
- Sesia uniformis Grote, 1868
- Macroglossa etolus Boisduval, 1875
- Macroglossa pyramus Boisduval, 1875

== See also ==
- Hummingbird hawkmoth
