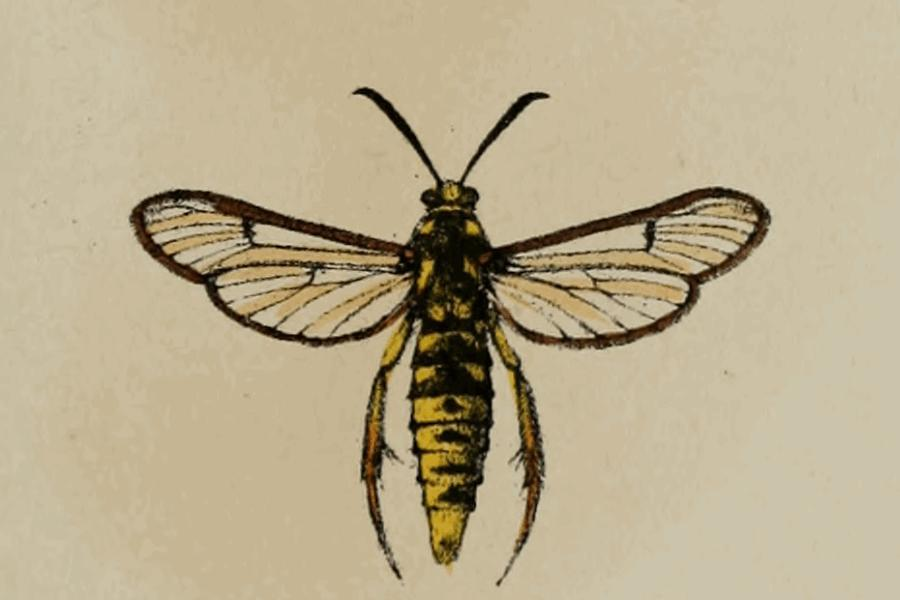
- Eusphecia pimplaeformis

Scientific classification
- Domain: Eukaryota
- Kingdom: Animalia
- Phylum: Arthropoda
- Class: Insecta
- Order: Lepidoptera
- Family: Sesiidae
- Tribe: Sesiini
- Genus: Eusphecia; Le Cerf, 1937

Species
- See text

= Eusphecia =

Genus of moths

Eusphecia is a genus of moths in the family Sesiidae.

== Species ==
- Eusphecia melanocephala (Dalman, 1816)
- Eusphecia pimplaeformis (Oberthür, 1872)
