= Camaegeria massai =

Scientific classification
- Domain: Eukaryota
- Kingdom: Animalia
- Phylum: Arthropoda
- Class: Insecta
- Order: Lepidoptera
- Family: Sesiidae
- Genus: Camaegeria
- Species: C. massai

Binomial name
- Camaegeria massai Bartsch & Berg, 2012

Species of moth

Camaegeria massai is a moth of the family Sesiidae. It is known from Tanzania and Kenya.

This species has a wingspan of 19–27 mm
