= Tipulamima auronitens =

Scientific classification
- Kingdom: Animalia
- Phylum: Arthropoda
- Clade: Pancrustacea
- Class: Insecta
- Order: Lepidoptera
- Family: Sesiidae
- Genus: Tipulamima
- Species: T. auronitens

Binomial name
- Tipulamima auronitens (Le Cerf, 1913)

Synonyms
- Sesia auronitens Le Cerf, 1913; Conopia auronitens

Species of moth

Tipulamima auronitens is a moth of the family Sesiidae. It is known from the Republic of the Congo.
