= Camaegeria polytelis =

Scientific classification
- Domain: Eukaryota
- Kingdom: Animalia
- Phylum: Arthropoda
- Class: Insecta
- Order: Lepidoptera
- Family: Sesiidae
- Genus: Camaegeria
- Species: C. polytelis

Binomial name
- Camaegeria polytelis Bartsch & Berg, 2012

Species of moth

Camaegeria polytelis is a moth of the family Sesiidae first described by Daniel Bartsch and Jutta Berg in 2012. It is known from eastern Madagascar.

This species has a wingspan of 19–24 millimetres (0.75–0.94 in) and it is close to Camaegeria xanthomos and Camaegeria sylvestralis. The holotype and most paratypes were provided from the region of Moramanga and Andasibe. Most of them were caught in disturbed primary forests.
