= Trilochana smaragdina =

Scientific classification
- Domain: Eukaryota
- Kingdom: Animalia
- Phylum: Arthropoda
- Class: Insecta
- Order: Lepidoptera
- Family: Sesiidae
- Genus: Trilochana
- Species: T. smaragdina

Binomial name
- Trilochana smaragdina Diakonoff 1954

Species of moth

Trilochana smaragdina is a moth of the family Sesiidae. It was known only from a single female from Papua, Indonesia, but has recently also been collected in Queensland, Australia.
