= Tipulamima tricincta =

Scientific classification
- Domain: Eukaryota
- Kingdom: Animalia
- Phylum: Arthropoda
- Class: Insecta
- Order: Lepidoptera
- Family: Sesiidae
- Genus: Tipulamima
- Species: T. tricincta

Binomial name
- Tipulamima tricincta (Le Cerf, 1916)

Synonyms
- Macrotarsipodes tricincta Le Cerf, 1916

Species of moth

Tipulamima tricincta is a moth of the family Sesiidae. It is known from South Africa.
