= Tipulamima hypocalla =

Scientific classification
- Domain: Eukaryota
- Kingdom: Animalia
- Phylum: Arthropoda
- Class: Insecta
- Order: Lepidoptera
- Family: Sesiidae
- Genus: Tipulamima
- Species: T. hypocalla

Binomial name
- Tipulamima hypocalla Le Cerf, 1937

Species of moth

Tipulamima hypocalla is a moth of the family Sesiidae. It is known from Angola.
