= Tipulamima sexualis =

Scientific classification
- Kingdom: Animalia
- Phylum: Arthropoda
- Class: Insecta
- Order: Lepidoptera
- Family: Sesiidae
- Genus: Tipulamima
- Species: T. sexualis

Binomial name
- Tipulamima sexualis (Hampson, 1910)

Synonyms
- Macrotarsipus sexualis Hampson, 1910; Macrotarsipus sexualis var. waterloti Le Cerf, 1917

Species of moth

Tipulamima sexualis is a moth of the family Sesiidae. It is known from Benin, Malawi and Nigeria.

The larvae feed on Ipomoea species.
