= Tipulamima pedunculata =

Scientific classification
- Kingdom: Animalia
- Phylum: Arthropoda
- Class: Insecta
- Order: Lepidoptera
- Family: Sesiidae
- Genus: Tipulamima
- Species: T. pedunculata

Binomial name
- Tipulamima pedunculata (Hampson, 1910)

Synonyms
- Ichneumenoptera pedunculata Hampson, 1910 (nec Sphecosesia pedunculata Hampson, 1910); Sphecosesia brachyptera Hampson, 1919

Species of moth

Tipulamima pedunculata is a moth of the family Sesiidae. It is known from Kenya.
