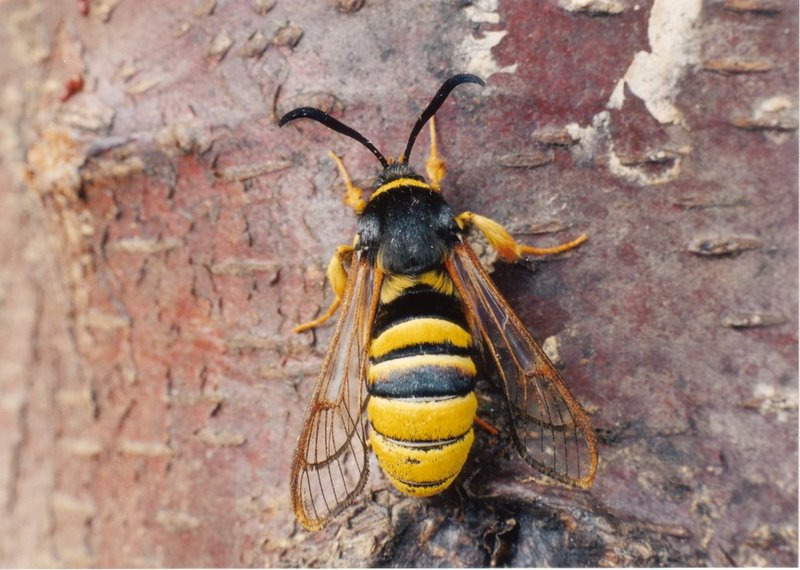

Scientific classification
- Kingdom: Animalia
- Phylum: Arthropoda
- Clade: Pancrustacea
- Class: Insecta
- Order: Lepidoptera
- Family: Sesiidae
- Genus: Sesia
- Species: S. bembeciformis

Binomial name
- Sesia bembeciformis (Hübner, 1806)

Synonyms
- Sphinx bembeciformis Hübner, 1806; Sphinx crabroniformis Lewin, 1797 (nec [Denis & Schiffermüller], 1775, nec Fabricius, 1793, nec Laspeyres, 1801); Sphecia dasypodiformis Walker, 1856; Aegeria montelli Löfqvist, 1922; Sphecia bembeciformis var. orophila Zukowsky, 1929; Aegeria bembeciformis ab. incognita Strand, [1927]; Sphecia bembeciformis f. fumosa Lempke, 1961

= Sesia bembeciformis =

Species of moth

Sesia bembeciformis, the lunar hornet moth, is a moth of the family Sesiidae. It is found in Europe.

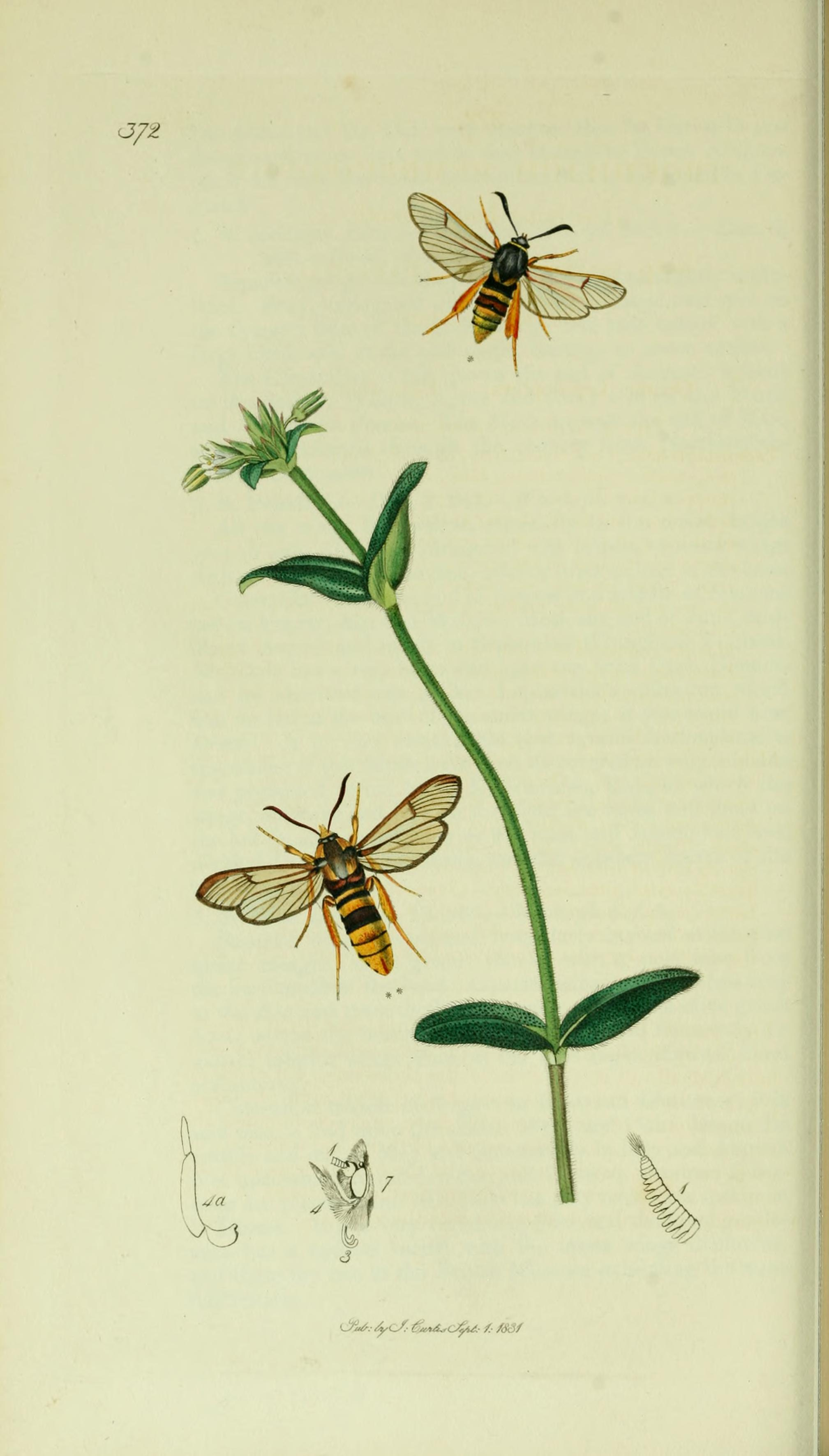
Illustration from John Curtis's British Entomology Volume 5, depicting Sesia apiformis and Sesia bembeciformis

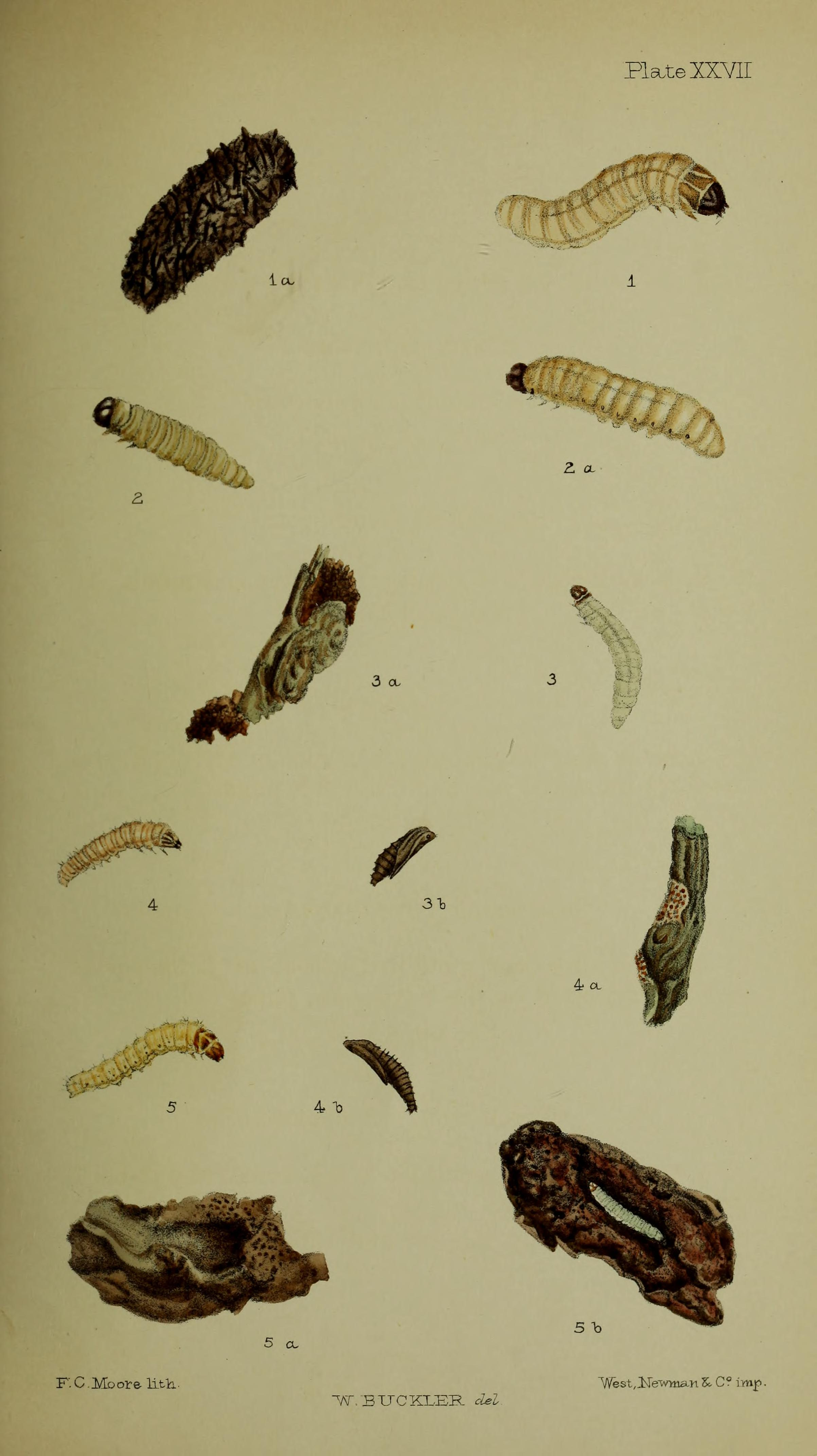
Figs. 2 larvae before last moult 2a larvae after last moult

The wingspan is 32–42 mm. The length of the forewings is 15–19 mm. Like all moths of the Sesiidae family, the Bembex clearwing resembles a hymenopteran (wasp) both in its appearance and flight. The wings are scaleless and transparent, narrow and elongated in shape.

Sesia bembeciformis is hardly distinguishable from its closest congener Sesia apiformis. However, apiformis has yellow 'epaulettes' on the "shoulders" directly above the wing bases; Sesia bembeciformis is dark coloured at this point except for the yellow neck ring. Sesia bembeciformis is also smaller and has a black head. In general, females are considerably larger than males. It resembles a big hornet (Vespa crabro) really well - an instance of mimicry.

The moths appear in June, July and August, they are then found resting on the trunks of willows. These include sal willow (Salix caprea), ash willow (Salix cinerea) and ear willow (Salix aurita). The eggs are laid on the bark. The larvae first gnaw between the bark and the wood, but later crawl further into the stem. Larva development takes 3 – 4 years. The species has a hidden way of life, and the imago lives only briefly, which makes it easily overlooked.
