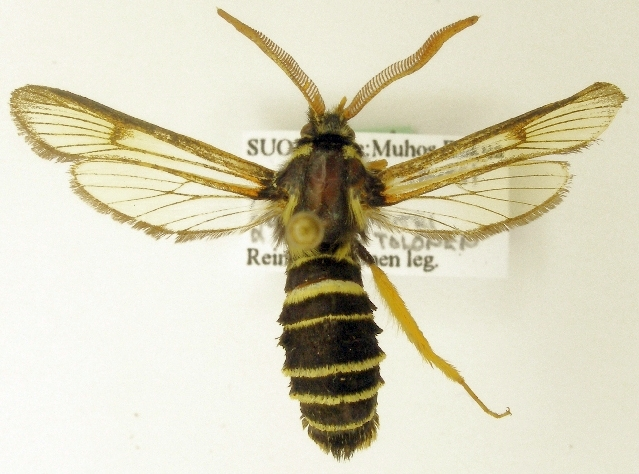

Scientific classification
- Kingdom: Animalia
- Phylum: Arthropoda
- Clade: Pancrustacea
- Class: Insecta
- Order: Lepidoptera
- Family: Sesiidae
- Genus: Eusphecia
- Species: E. melanocephala

Binomial name
- Eusphecia melanocephala (Dalman, 1816)

Synonyms
- Sesia melanocephala Dalman, 1816; Sphinx laphriaeformis Hübner, [1824–1825]; Trochilium melanocephalum; Trochilium melanocephala; Aegeria melanocephala

= Eusphecia melanocephala =

Species of moth

Eusphecia melanocephala is a moth of the family Sesiidae. It is found in central, eastern and northern Europe and parts of western Europe as well as Asia. The range extends from the Pyrenees, through southern France and central Europe into Asia. In the north, it can be found up to Fennoscandia and in the south down to the southern edge of the Alps and the northern Balkans.

The wingspan is 30–40 mm. Adults are on wing from June to July in one generation depending on the location.

The larvae feed on Populus tremula.
