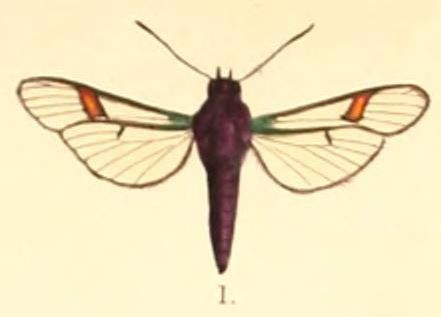

Scientific classification
- Kingdom: Animalia
- Phylum: Arthropoda
- Class: Insecta
- Order: Lepidoptera
- Family: Sesiidae
- Tribe: Paranthrenini
- Genus: Pramila; Moore, 1879
- Species: P. atkinsoni

Binomial name
- Pramila atkinsoni Moore, 1879

= Pramila (moth) =

Genus of moths

Pramila is a monotypic genus of moth in the family Sesiidae. Its only species, Pramila atkinsoni, occurs in the Bengal region of what was British India. Both the genus and species were first described by Frederic Moore in 1879.
