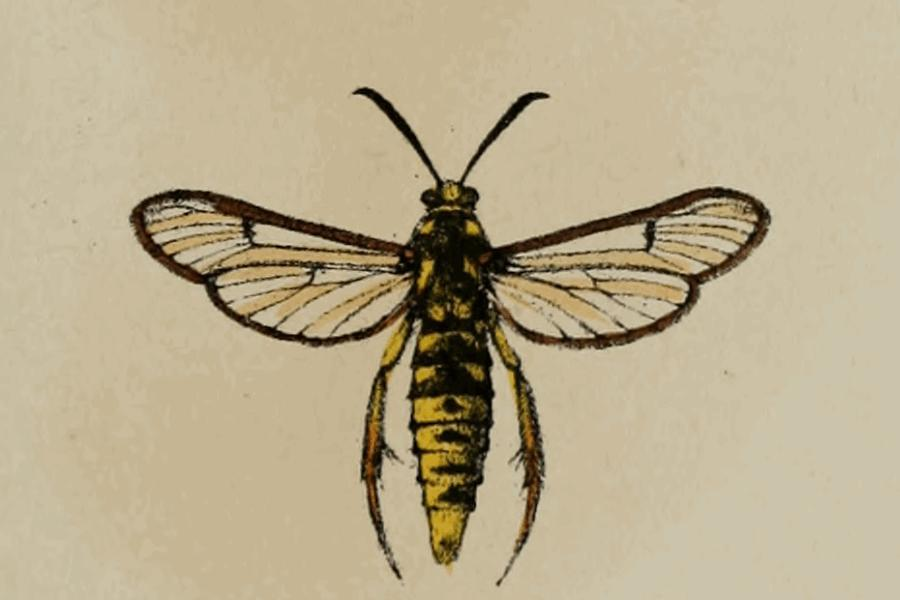

Scientific classification
- Domain: Eukaryota
- Kingdom: Animalia
- Phylum: Arthropoda
- Class: Insecta
- Order: Lepidoptera
- Family: Sesiidae
- Genus: Eusphecia
- Species: E. pimplaeformis

Binomial name
- Eusphecia pimplaeformis (Oberthür, 1872)

Synonyms
- Sesia pimplaeformis Oberthur, 1872; Trochilium maculiferum Staudinger, 1895

= Eusphecia pimplaeformis =

Species of moth

Eusphecia pimplaeformis is a moth of the family Sesiidae. It is found in Bulgaria, the Republic of Macedonia and Greece, as well as Turkey, Iran, the Caucasus and Iraq.

The larvae feed on Populus alba and sometimes Salix species. They mine the trunks of their host plant.
