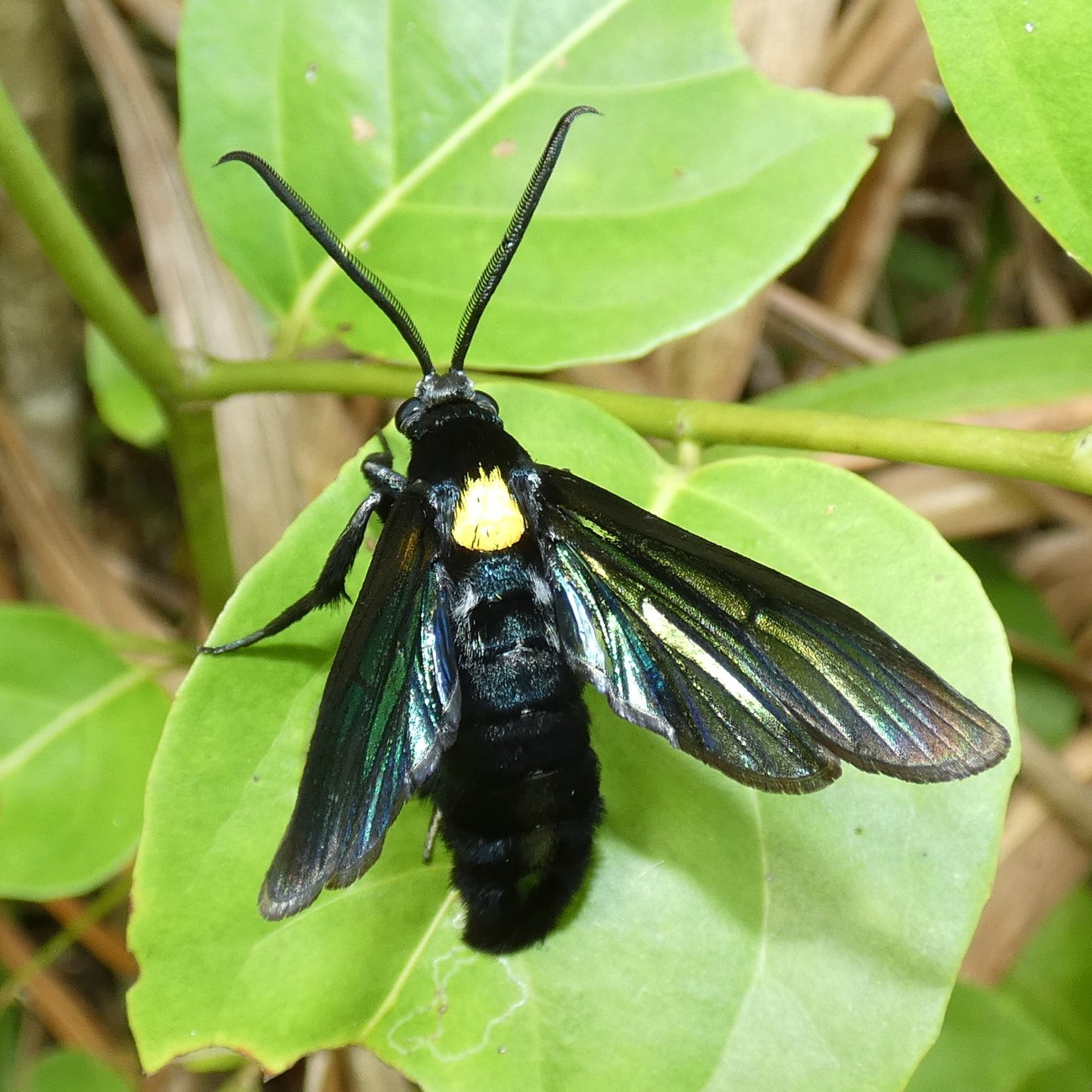
- Trilochana triscoliopsis

Scientific classification
- Kingdom: Animalia
- Phylum: Arthropoda
- Clade: Pancrustacea
- Class: Insecta
- Order: Lepidoptera
- Family: Sesiidae
- Tribe: Sesiini
- Genus: Trilochana; Moore, 1879

Species
- See text

= Trilochana =

Genus of moths

Trilochana is a genus of moths in the family Sesiidae.

== Species ==
- Trilochana scolioides Moore, 1879
- Trilochana caseariae Yang & Wang, 1989
- Trilochana chalciptera Hampson, 1919
- Trilochana illustris Kallies & Arita, 1998
- Trilochana insignis (Butler, 1885)
- Trilochana nagaii Arita & Kallies, 2003
- Trilochana oberthueri Le Cerf, 1917
- Trilochana smaragdina Diakonoff, 1954
- Trilochana triscoliopsis Rothschild, 1925
