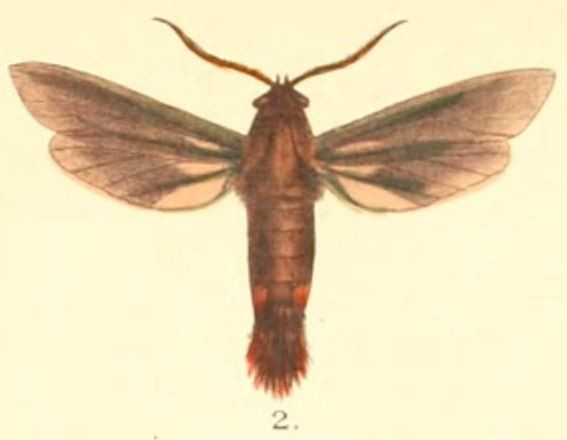

Scientific classification
- Domain: Eukaryota
- Kingdom: Animalia
- Phylum: Arthropoda
- Class: Insecta
- Order: Lepidoptera
- Family: Sesiidae
- Genus: Trilochana
- Species: T. scolioides

Binomial name
- Trilochana scolioides Moore, 1879

Synonyms
- Trilochana megascolioides Arita, 1989

= Trilochana scolioides =

Species of moth

Trilochana scolioides is a moth of the family Sesiidae. It is found in India (Darjeeling), Thailand and Vietnam.
