= Camaegeria xanthopimplaeformis =

Scientific classification
- Kingdom: Animalia
- Phylum: Arthropoda
- Class: Insecta
- Order: Lepidoptera
- Family: Sesiidae
- Genus: Camaegeria
- Species: C. xanthopimplaeformis

Binomial name
- Camaegeria xanthopimplaeformis (Viette, 1955)

Synonyms
- Lepidopoda xanthopimplaeformis Viette, 1955

Species of moth

Camaegeria xanthopimplaeformis is a moth of the family Sesiidae. It is known from eastern Madagascar.

This species has a wingspan of 26 millimetres (1.0 in) with a length of the forewings of 12 mm (0.47 in). The forewings are hyaline with steel-blue reflects and the costal and marginal region blackish and bronze. It can be distinguished by its yellow body.

The holotype was collected by A.Seyrig North of Anivorano at the railroad Antananarivo-Toamasina.
