= Aschistophleps =

Scientific classification
- Kingdom: Animalia
- Phylum: Arthropoda
- Class: Insecta
- Order: Lepidoptera
- Family: Sesiidae
- Tribe: Osminiini
- Genus: Aschistophleps; Hampson [1893]

Type species
- Aschistophleps lampropoda Hampson, 1893

Species
- See text

Genus of moths

Aschistophleps is a genus of moths in the family Sesiidae.

== Species ==
- Aschistophleps argentifasciata Skowron Volponi & Volponi, 2018
- Aschistophleps bicella (Xu & Arita, 2015)
- Aschistophleps cruentata (Swinhoe, 1896)
- Aschistophleps cucphuonganae (Arita & Gorbunov, 2000)
- Aschistophleps ellawi (Skowron Volponi, 2017)
- Aschistophleps haematochrodes Le Cerf, 1912
- Aschistophleps ignisquamulata Kallies & Štolc, 2018
- Aschistophleps lampropoda Hampson, 1892
- Aschistophleps longipoda Arita & Gorbunov, 2000
- Aschistophleps nigripennis (Arita & Gorbunov, 2000)
- Aschistophleps ruficrista (Rothschild, 1912)
- Aschistophleps vitripennis (Arita & Gorbunov, 2000)
- Aschistophleps xanthocrista Gorbunov & Arita, 1995
