= Camaegeria exochiformis =

Scientific classification
- Kingdom: Animalia
- Phylum: Arthropoda
- Class: Insecta
- Order: Lepidoptera
- Family: Sesiidae
- Genus: Camaegeria
- Species: C. exochiformis

Binomial name
- Camaegeria exochiformis (Walker, 1856)

Synonyms
- Aegeria exochiformis Walker, 1856

Species of moth

Camaegeria exochiformis is a moth of the family Sesiidae. It is known from Ghana and Sierra Leone.
