= Macrotarsipus albipunctus =

Scientific classification
- Kingdom: Animalia
- Phylum: Arthropoda
- Class: Insecta
- Order: Lepidoptera
- Family: Sesiidae
- Genus: Macrotarsipus
- Species: M. albipunctus

Binomial name
- Macrotarsipus albipunctus Hampson, [1893]

Species of moth

Macrotarsipus albipunctus is a moth of the family Sesiidae. It was described by George Hampson in 1893 and is known from Myanmar and central Vietnam. There are also records from Kenya and Malawi.

The wingspan is 22–24 mm.
