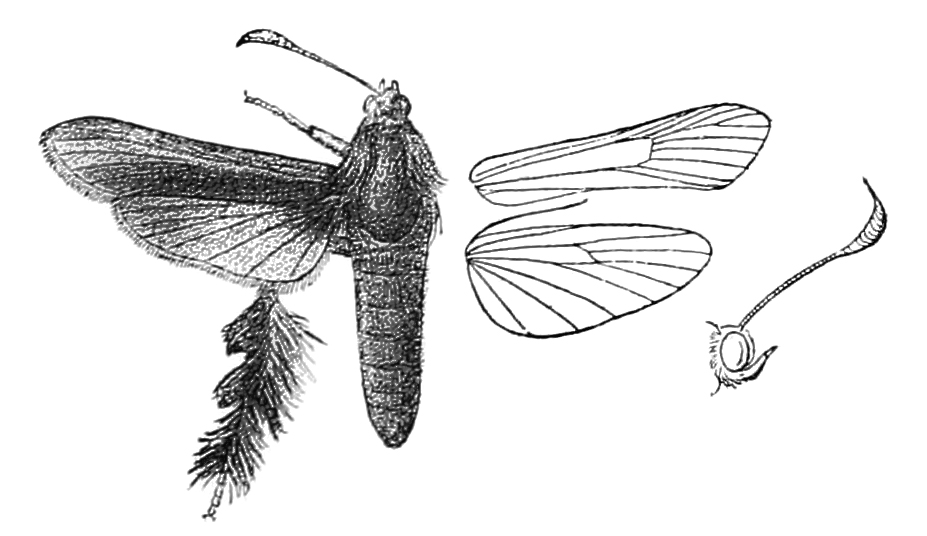
- Lenyra ashtaroth

Scientific classification
- Kingdom: Animalia
- Phylum: Arthropoda
- Class: Insecta
- Order: Lepidoptera
- Family: Sesiidae
- Tribe: Sesiini
- Genus: Lenyra; Walker, 1856

Species
- See text

= Lenyra =

Genus of moths

Lenyra is a genus of moths in the family Sesiidae.

== Species ==
- Lenyra ashtaroth (Westwood, 1848)
