= Adixoa =

Scientific classification
- Kingdom: Animalia
- Phylum: Arthropoda
- Class: Insecta
- Order: Lepidoptera
- Family: Sesiidae
- Tribe: Paranthrenini
- Genus: Adixoa; Hampson, [1893]

Species
- See text

Genus of moths

Adixoa is a genus of moths in the family Sesiidae.

== Species ==
- Adixoa alterna (Walker, [1865])
- Adixoa leucocyanea (Zukowsky, 1929)
- Adixoa tomentosa Schultze, 1908
- Adixoa trizonata (Hampson, 1900)
