= Camaegeria sylvestralis =

Scientific classification
- Kingdom: Animalia
- Phylum: Arthropoda
- Class: Insecta
- Order: Lepidoptera
- Family: Sesiidae
- Genus: Camaegeria
- Species: C. sylvestralis

Binomial name
- Camaegeria sylvestralis (Viette, 1955)

Synonyms
- Lepidopoda sylvestralis Viette, 1955

Species of moth

Camaegeria sylvestralis is a moth of the family Sesiidae. It is known from eastern Madagascar.

This species has a wingspan of 36 millimetres (1.4 in) with a length of the forewings of 17 mm (0.67 in). Both pairs of wings are completely hyaline. This species is close to Camaegeria xanthomos and Camaegeria polytelis from which it can be distinguished by the abdomen that is dorsally completely red.
