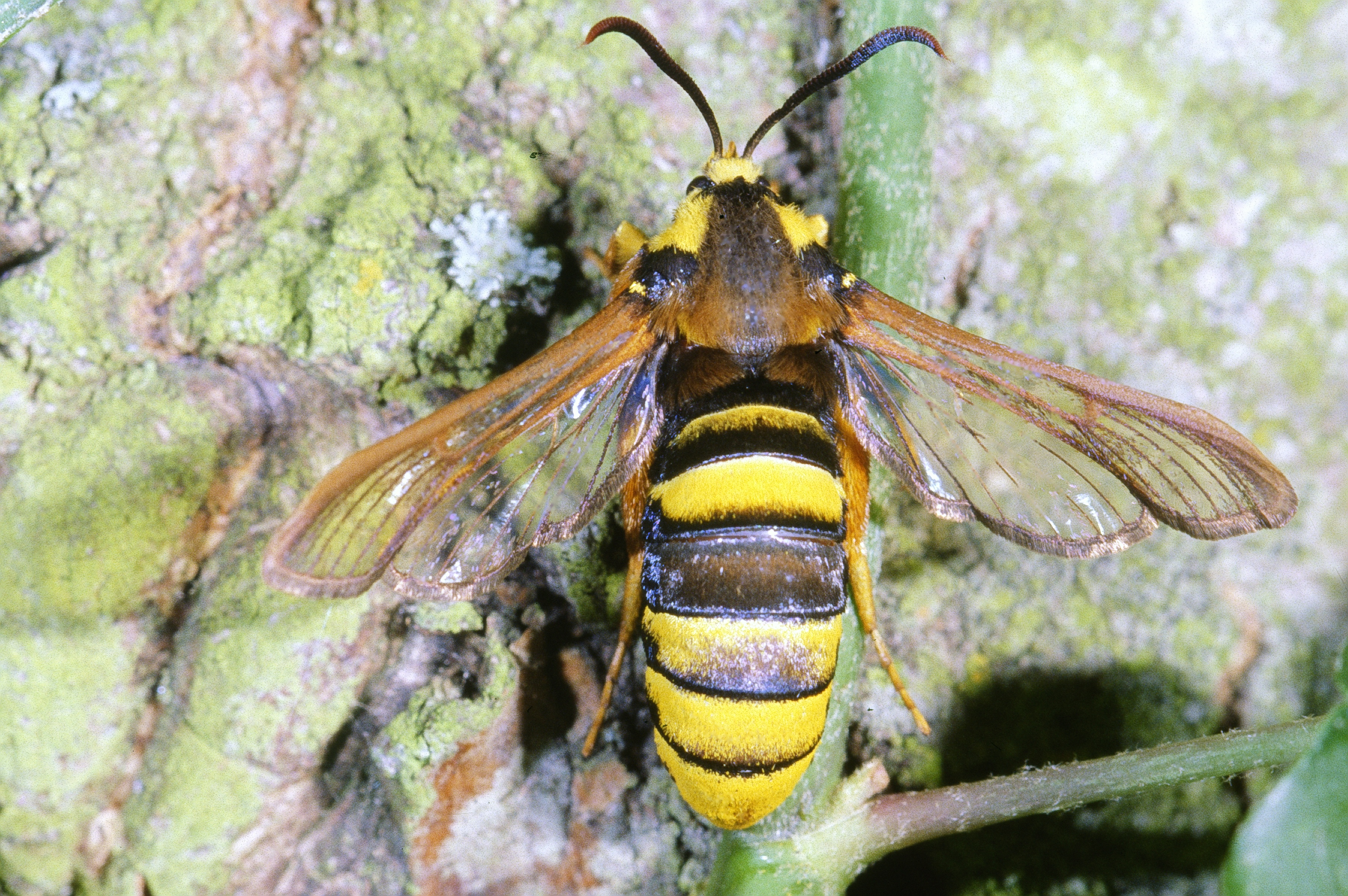
- Sésia apiformis

Scientific classification
- Kingdom: Animalia
- Phylum: Arthropoda
- Clade: Pancrustacea
- Class: Insecta
- Order: Lepidoptera
- Family: Sesiidae
- Tribe: Sesiini
- Genus: Sesia; Fabricius, 1775

Species
- See text

= Sesia (moth) =

Genus of moths

Sesia is a genus of moths in the family Sesiidae.

== Species ==
- Sesia apiformis (Clerck, 1759)
- Sesia bembeciformis (Hübner, [1803-1806])
- Sesia flavicollis (Hampson, [1893])
- Sesia gloriosa (Le Cerf, 1914)
- Sesia himachalensis Kallies & de Freina, 2009
- Sesia huaxica Xu, 1995
- Sesia ladakhensis Špatenka, 1990
- Sesia nirdhoji Petersen & Lingenhöle, 1998
- Sesia oberthueri (Le Cerf, 1914)
- Sesia przewalskii (Alpheraky, 1882)
- Sesia ruficollis Petersen & Lingenhöle, 1998
- Sesia siningensis (Hsu, 1981)
- Sesia solitera Špatenka & Arita, 1992
- Sesia tibetensis Arita & Xu, 1994b
- Sesia timur (Grum-Grshimailo, 1893)
- Sesia yezoensis (Hampson, 1919)
- Sesia ignicollis (Hampson, [1893])
- Sesia ommatiaeformis (Moore, 1891)
- Sesia repanda (Walker, 1856)
- Sesia spartani Eichlin & Taft, 1988
- Sesia tibialis (Harris, 1839)

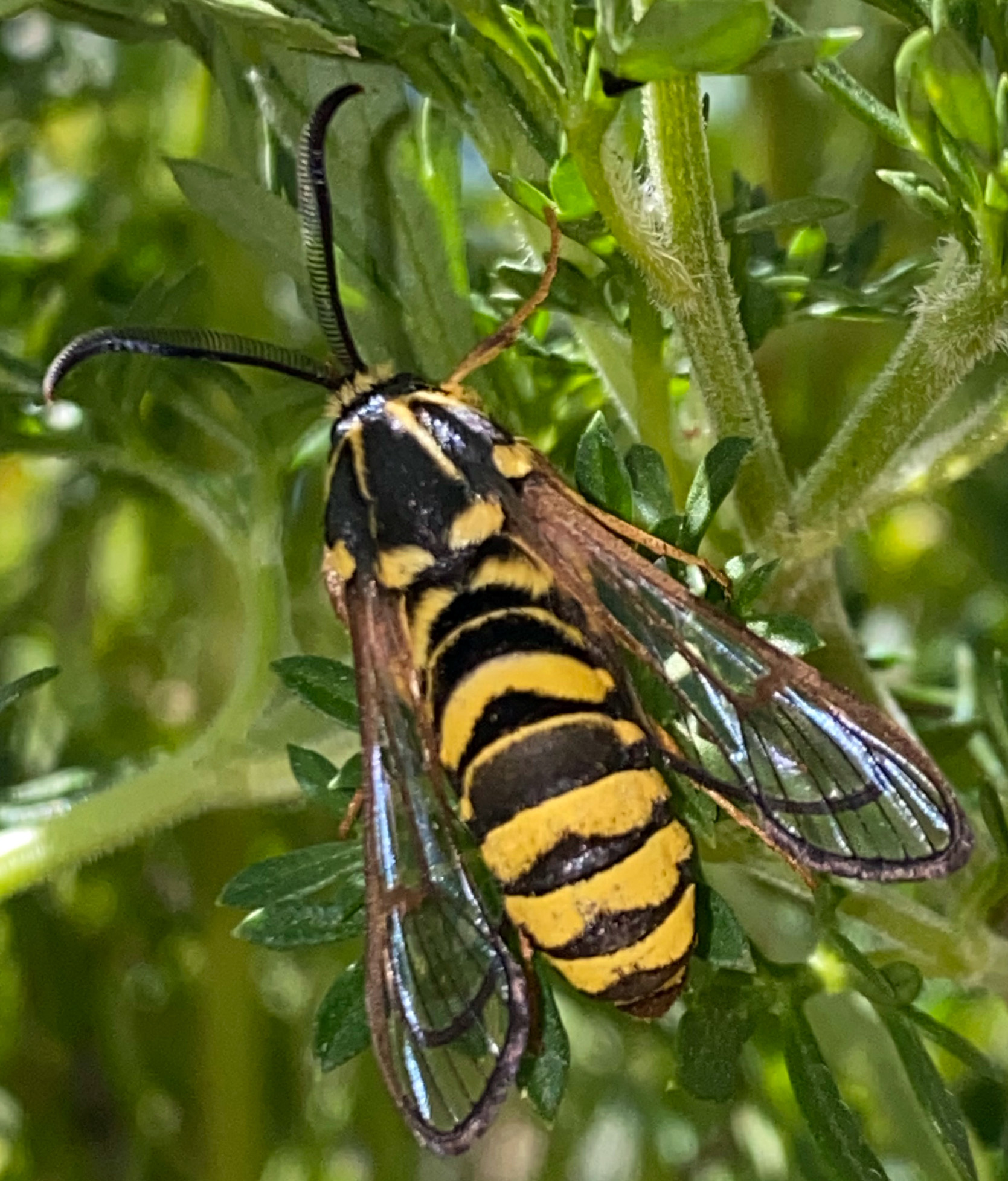
Sesia pacificum in Oregon
