= Camaegeria sophax =

Scientific classification
- Domain: Eukaryota
- Kingdom: Animalia
- Phylum: Arthropoda
- Class: Insecta
- Order: Lepidoptera
- Family: Sesiidae
- Genus: Camaegeria
- Species: C. sophax

Binomial name
- Camaegeria sophax (H. Druce, 1899)

Synonyms
- Aegeria sophax H. Druce, 1899

Species of moth

Camaegeria sophax is a moth of the family Sesiidae first described by Herbert Druce in 1899. It is known from Malawi, Mozambique, Uganda and Zimbabwe.
