= Osminia namibiana =

Scientific classification
- Domain: Eukaryota
- Kingdom: Animalia
- Phylum: Arthropoda
- Class: Insecta
- Order: Lepidoptera
- Family: Sesiidae
- Genus: Osminia
- Species: O. namibiana

Binomial name
- Osminia namibiana Kallies, 2004

Species of moth

Osminia namibiana is a moth of the family Sesiidae. It is known from Namibia.
