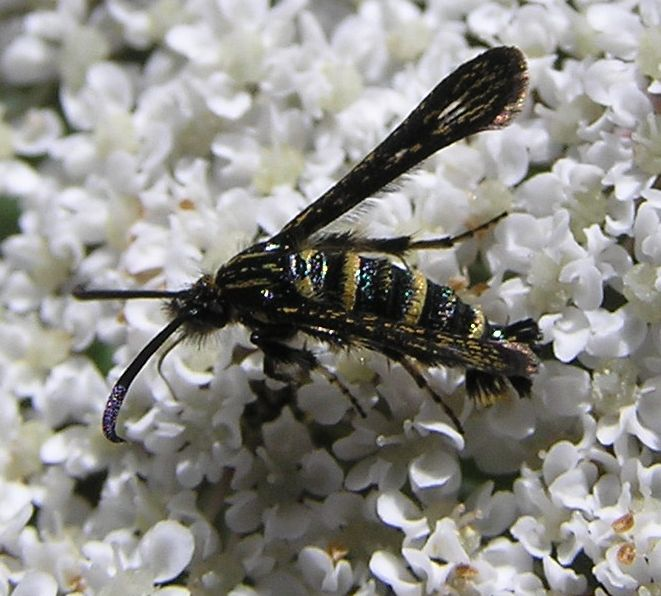

Scientific classification
- Domain: Eukaryota
- Kingdom: Animalia
- Phylum: Arthropoda
- Class: Insecta
- Order: Lepidoptera
- Family: Sesiidae
- Genus: Osminia
- Species: O. fenusaeformis

Binomial name
- Osminia fenusaeformis (Herrich-Schaffer, 1852)

Synonyms
- Sesia fenusaeformis Herrich-Schaffer, 1852; Sesia fenusiformis Staudinger, 1856; Sesia pompiliformis Herrich-Schäffer, 1846; Sesia alysaeformis Herrich-Schäffer, 1846; Sesia foenusaeformis Herrich-Schäffer, 1846; Sesia leucopsiformis Herrich-Schäffer, 1846 (nec Esper, 1800)

= Osminia fenusaeformis =

Species of moth

Osminia fenusaeformis is a moth of the family Sesiidae. It is found on Crete and from Asia Minor to Iran and to the Levant.

The larvae possibly feed on Rumex species.
