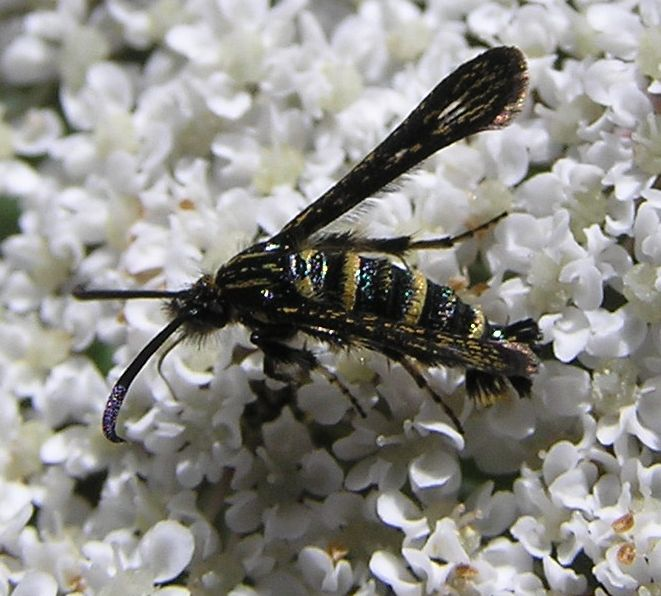
- Osminia fenusaeformis

Scientific classification
- Domain: Eukaryota
- Kingdom: Animalia
- Phylum: Arthropoda
- Class: Insecta
- Order: Lepidoptera
- Family: Sesiidae
- Tribe: Osminiini
- Genus: Osminia; Le Cerf, 1917

= Osminia =

Genus of moths

Osminia is a genus of moths in the family Sesiidae.

== Species ==
- Osminia donahueorum Duckworth & Eichlin, 1983
- Osminia ruficornis (Edwards, 1881)
- Osminia albipilosa Eichlin, 1998
- Osminia bicornicolis Duckworth & Eichlin, 1983
- Osminia colimaensis Duckworth & Eichlin, 1983
- Osminia exigua Eichlin, 1998
- Osminia fenusaeformis (Herrich-Schäffer, 1852)
- Osminia ferruginea Le Cerf, 1917
- Osminia fisheri Eichlin, 1987
- Osminia heitzmani Eichlin, 1998
- Osminia phalarocera Duckworth & Eichlin, 1983
- Osminia rubrialvus Eichlin, 1998
- Osminia namibiana Kallies, 2004
- Osminia gorodinskii (Gorbunov & Arita, 2001)
