= Glyphipterix plagiographa =

Scientific classification
- Kingdom: Animalia
- Phylum: Arthropoda
- Clade: Pancrustacea
- Class: Insecta
- Order: Lepidoptera
- Family: Glyphipterigidae
- Genus: Glyphipterix
- Species: G. plagiographa

Binomial name
- Glyphipterix plagiographa Bradley, 1965

Species of moth

Glyphipterix plagiographa is a species of sedge moth in the genus Glyphipterix. It was described by John David Bradley in 1965 and is found in Uganda.
