= Glyphipterix tetrachrysa =

Scientific classification
- Kingdom: Animalia
- Phylum: Arthropoda
- Clade: Pancrustacea
- Class: Insecta
- Order: Lepidoptera
- Family: Glyphipterigidae
- Genus: Glyphipterix
- Species: G. tetrachrysa

Binomial name
- Glyphipterix tetrachrysa Meyrick, 1907

Species of moth

Glyphipterix tetrachrysa is a species of sedge moth in the genus Glyphipterix. It was described by Edward Meyrick in 1907. It is found in Sri Lanka.
