= Glyphipterix callidelta =

Scientific classification
- Kingdom: Animalia
- Phylum: Arthropoda
- Clade: Pancrustacea
- Class: Insecta
- Order: Lepidoptera
- Family: Glyphipterigidae
- Genus: Glyphipterix
- Species: G. callidelta

Binomial name
- Glyphipterix callidelta Meyrick, 1922

Species of sedge moth

Glyphipterix callidelta is a species of sedge moth in the genus Glyphipterix. It was described by Edward Meyrick in 1922. It is found in South America.
