= Glyphipterix bohemani =

Scientific classification
- Kingdom: Animalia
- Phylum: Arthropoda
- Clade: Pancrustacea
- Class: Insecta
- Order: Lepidoptera
- Family: Glyphipterigidae
- Genus: Glyphipterix
- Species: G. bohemani

Binomial name
- Glyphipterix bohemani (Zeller, 1852)

Synonyms
- Aechmia bohemani Zeller, 1852

Species of moth

Glyphipterix bohemani is a moth in the family Glyphipterigidae. It is known from South Africa.
