= Glyphipterix cestrota =

Scientific classification
- Kingdom: Animalia
- Phylum: Arthropoda
- Clade: Pancrustacea
- Class: Insecta
- Order: Lepidoptera
- Family: Glyphipterigidae
- Genus: Glyphipterix
- Species: G. cestrota

Binomial name
- Glyphipterix cestrota Meyrick, 1915

Species of moth

Glyphipterix cestrota is a species of sedge moth in the genus Glyphipterix. It was described by Edward Meyrick in 1915. It is found in Peru.
