= Glyphipterix diplotoxa =

Scientific classification
- Kingdom: Animalia
- Phylum: Arthropoda
- Clade: Pancrustacea
- Class: Insecta
- Order: Lepidoptera
- Family: Glyphipterigidae
- Genus: Glyphipterix
- Species: G. diplotoxa

Binomial name
- Glyphipterix diplotoxa Meyrick, 1920

Species of moth

Glyphipterix diplotoxa is a moth in the family Glyphipterigidae. It is known from South Africa.
