= Glyphipterix rhanteria =

Scientific classification
- Kingdom: Animalia
- Phylum: Arthropoda
- Clade: Pancrustacea
- Class: Insecta
- Order: Lepidoptera
- Family: Glyphipterigidae
- Genus: Glyphipterix
- Species: G. rhanteria

Binomial name
- Glyphipterix rhanteria Turner, 1913

Synonyms
- Acrolepia honorata Meyrick, 1921; Glyphipterix honorata

Species of moth

Glyphipterix rhanteria is a species of sedge moth in the genus Glyphipterix. It was described by Alfred Jefferis Turner in 1913. It is found in Australia, including Queensland.
