= Glyphipterix harpogramma =

Scientific classification
- Kingdom: Animalia
- Phylum: Arthropoda
- Clade: Pancrustacea
- Class: Insecta
- Order: Lepidoptera
- Family: Glyphipterigidae
- Genus: Glyphipterix
- Species: G. harpogramma

Binomial name
- Glyphipterix harpogramma (Turner, 1913)

Synonyms
- Glyphipteryx harpogramma Turner, 1913

Species of moth

Glyphipterix harpogramma is a species of sedge moth in the genus Glyphipterix. It was described by Turner in 1913. It is found in Australia, including Queensland.
