= Glyphipterix isoclista =

Scientific classification
- Kingdom: Animalia
- Phylum: Arthropoda
- Clade: Pancrustacea
- Class: Insecta
- Order: Lepidoptera
- Family: Glyphipterigidae
- Genus: Glyphipterix
- Species: G. isoclista

Binomial name
- Glyphipterix isoclista Meyrick, 1925

Species of moth

Glyphipterix isoclista is a species of sedge moth in the genus Glyphipterix. It was described by Edward Meyrick in 1925. It is found in Fiji.
