= Glyphipterix gemmipunctella =

Scientific classification
- Kingdom: Animalia
- Phylum: Arthropoda
- Clade: Pancrustacea
- Class: Insecta
- Order: Lepidoptera
- Family: Glyphipterigidae
- Genus: Glyphipterix
- Species: G. gemmipunctella

Binomial name
- Glyphipterix gemmipunctella Walker, 1869

Synonyms
- Gelechia gemmipunctella Walker, 1869; Glyphipterix atristriella Zeller, 1877; Glyphipteryx chrysolithella Meyrick, 1880

Species of moth

Glyphipterix gemmipunctella is a species of sedge moth in the genus Glyphipterix. It is found in Australia, where it is found on the Atherton Tableland in Queensland and from southern Queensland to Victoria.
