= Glyphipterix cyanochalca =

Scientific classification
- Kingdom: Animalia
- Phylum: Arthropoda
- Clade: Pancrustacea
- Class: Insecta
- Order: Lepidoptera
- Family: Glyphipterigidae
- Genus: Glyphipterix
- Species: G. cyanochalca

Binomial name
- Glyphipterix cyanochalca Meyrick, 1882

Synonyms
- Glyphipteryx lyelliana Lower, 1893; Glyphipterix lyelliana

Species of moth

Glyphipterix cyanochalca is a species of sedge moth in the genus Glyphipterix. It was described by Edward Meyrick in 1882. It is found in south-east Australia.
