= Glyphipterix triplaca =

Scientific classification
- Kingdom: Animalia
- Phylum: Arthropoda
- Clade: Pancrustacea
- Class: Insecta
- Order: Lepidoptera
- Family: Glyphipterigidae
- Genus: Glyphipterix
- Species: G. triplaca

Binomial name
- Glyphipterix triplaca Turner, 1913

Species of moth

Glyphipterix triplaca is a species of sedge moth in the genus Glyphipterix. It was described by Alfred Jefferis Turner. It is found in Australia, including Queensland.
