= Glyphipterix maritima =

Scientific classification
- Kingdom: Animalia
- Phylum: Arthropoda
- Clade: Pancrustacea
- Class: Insecta
- Order: Lepidoptera
- Family: Glyphipterigidae
- Genus: Glyphipterix
- Species: G. maritima

Binomial name
- Glyphipterix maritima Diakonoff, 1979

Species of moth

Glyphipterix maritima is a species of sedge moth in the genus Glyphipterix. It was described by Alexey Diakonoff in 1979. It is found in Russia.
