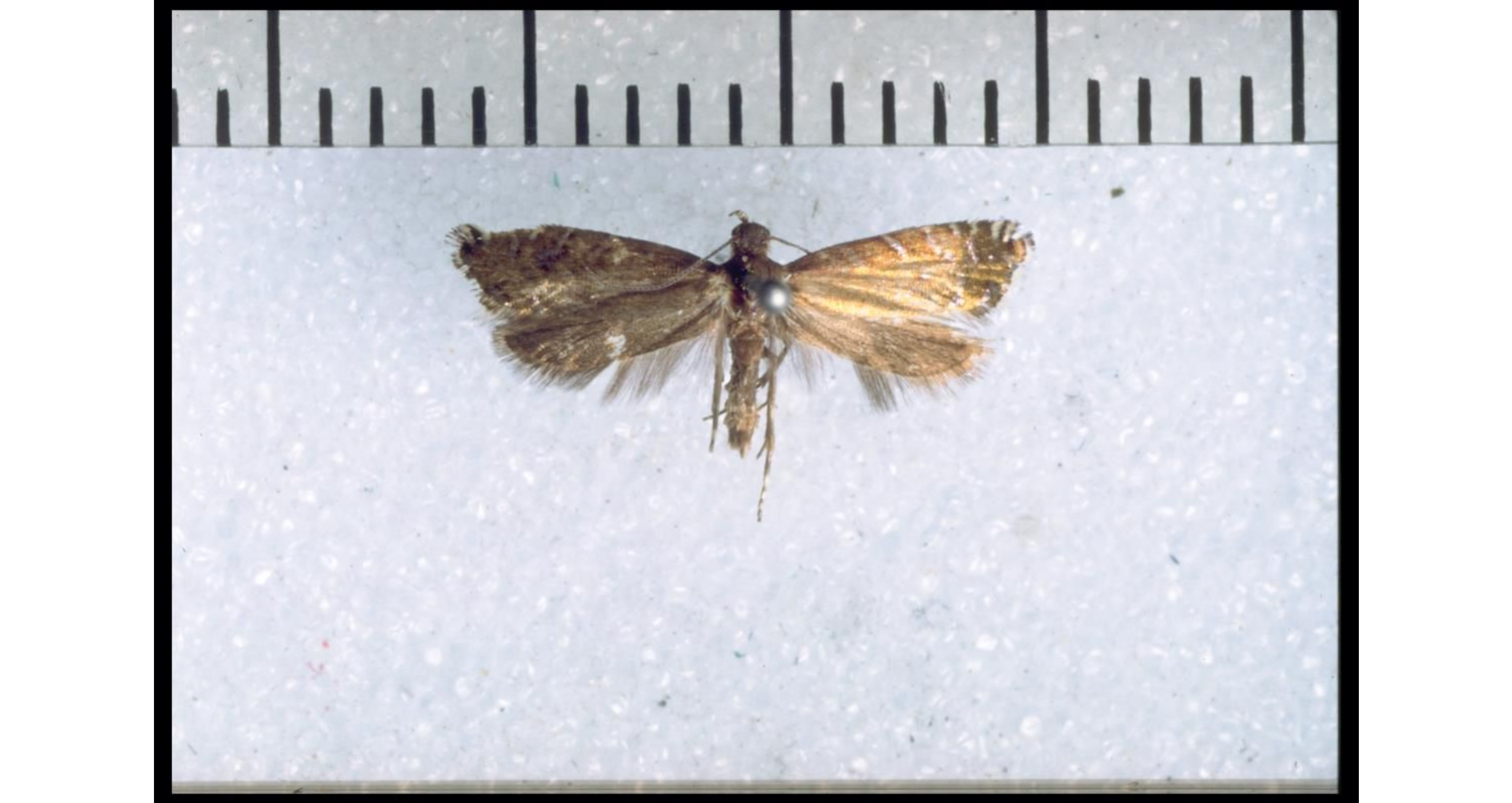

Scientific classification
- Kingdom: Animalia
- Phylum: Arthropoda
- Clade: Pancrustacea
- Class: Insecta
- Order: Lepidoptera
- Family: Glyphipterigidae
- Genus: Glyphipterix
- Species: G. octonaria

Binomial name
- Glyphipterix octonaria Philpott, 1924

= Glyphipterix octonaria =

Species of moth

Glyphipterix octonaria is a species of sedge moth in the genus Glyphipterix. It was described by Alfred Philpott, 1924. It is found in New Zealand.
