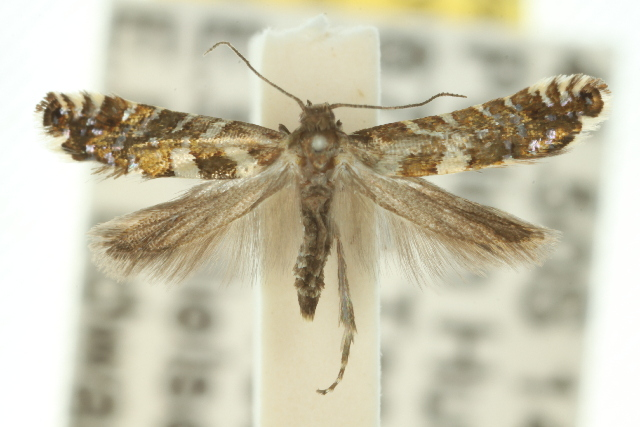

Scientific classification
- Kingdom: Animalia
- Phylum: Arthropoda
- Clade: Pancrustacea
- Class: Insecta
- Order: Lepidoptera
- Family: Glyphipterigidae
- Genus: Glyphipterix
- Species: G. tetrasema

Binomial name
- Glyphipterix tetrasema Meyrick, 1882

= Glyphipterix tetrasema =

Species of moth

Glyphipterix tetrasema is a species of sedge moth in the genus Glyphipterix. It was described by Edward Meyrick in 1882. It is found in Australia, including Tasmania.
