= Glyphipterix oxycopis =

Scientific classification
- Kingdom: Animalia
- Phylum: Arthropoda
- Clade: Pancrustacea
- Class: Insecta
- Order: Lepidoptera
- Family: Glyphipterigidae
- Genus: Glyphipterix
- Species: G. oxycopis

Binomial name
- Glyphipterix oxycopis Meyrick, 1918

Species of moth

Glyphipterix oxycopis is a species of sedge moth in the genus Glyphipterix. It was described by Edward Meyrick in 1918. It is found in Assam in India and in Sri Lanka.
