= Glyphipterix actinobola =

Scientific classification
- Kingdom: Animalia
- Phylum: Arthropoda
- Clade: Pancrustacea
- Class: Insecta
- Order: Lepidoptera
- Family: Glyphipterigidae
- Genus: Glyphipterix
- Species: G. actinobola

Binomial name
- Glyphipterix actinobola Meyrick, 1880

Species of moth

Glyphipterix actinobola is a species of sedge moth in the genus Glyphipterix. It was described by Edward Meyrick in 1880. It is found in Australia.
