= Glyphipterix melania =

Scientific classification
- Kingdom: Animalia
- Phylum: Arthropoda
- Clade: Pancrustacea
- Class: Insecta
- Order: Lepidoptera
- Family: Glyphipterigidae
- Genus: Glyphipterix
- Species: G. melania

Binomial name
- Glyphipterix melania Diakonoff, 1976

Species of moth

Glyphipterix melania is a species of sedge moth in the genus Glyphipterix. It was described by Alexey Diakonoff in 1976. It is found in Japan.
