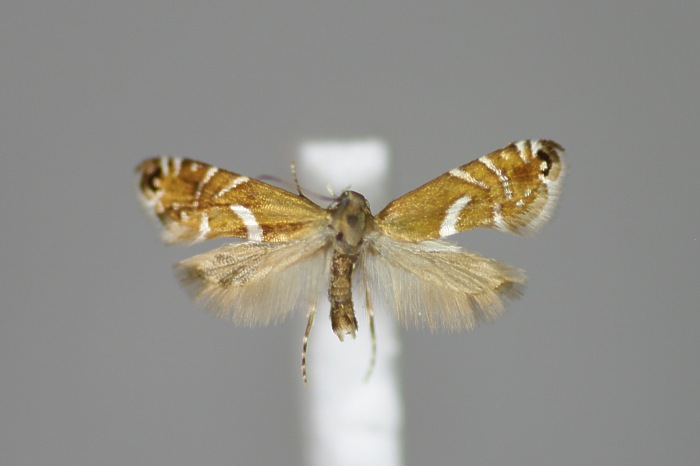
- Glyphipterix forsterella

Scientific classification
- Kingdom: Animalia
- Phylum: Arthropoda
- Clade: Pancrustacea
- Class: Insecta
- Order: Lepidoptera
- Family: Glyphipterigidae
- Genus: Glyphipterix; Hübner, 1825

Synonyms
- Aechmia Treitschke, 1833; Aecimia Boisduval, 1836; Anacampsoides Bruand, [1851]; Apistomorpha Meyrick, 1880; Circica Meyrick, 1888; Diploschizia Heppner, 1981; Glyphipteryx Zeller, 1839; Phryganostola Meyrick, 1880; Heribeia Stephens, 1829

= Glyphipterix =

Genus of moths

Glyphipterix is a genus of sedge moths. It was described by Jacob Hübner in 1825.

== Taxonomy ==
This genus was first described by Jacob Hübner in 1825. In 1986 the International Commission on Zoological Nomenclature treated Glyphipteryx Curtis, 1827 as an unjustified emendation of Glyphipterix Hübner, [1825].

== Species ==
- Glyphipterix achlyoessa (Meyrick, 1880) (New Zealand)
- Glyphipterix acinacella Meyrick, 1882 (Australia)
- Glyphipterix acronoma Meyrick, 1888 (New Zealand)
- Glyphipterix acrothecta Meyrick, 1880 (New Zealand)
- Glyphipterix actinobola Meyrick, 1880 (Australia)
- Glyphipterix aenea Philpott, 1917 (New Zealand)
- Glyphipterix aerifera Meyrick, 1912 (New Zealand)
- Glyphipterix affinis Arita & Heppner, 1992 (Taiwan)
- Glyphipterix alpha Moriuti & Saito, 1964 (Japan)
- Glyphipterix amblycerella Meyrick, 1882 (Australia)
- Glyphipterix ametris Diakonoff, 1979 (Taiwan)
- Glyphipterix amphipeda Meyrick, 1920 (South Africa)
- Glyphipterix amphipoda
- Glyphipterix amseli Diakonoff, 1978 (China)
- Glyphipterix anaclastis (Meyrick, 1907) (Australia)
- Glyphipterix angoonae Arita, 1983 (Thailand)
- Glyphipterix antidoxa Meyrick, 1909 (India and Sri Lanka)
- Glyphipterix archimedica Meyrick, 1921 (South Africa)
- Glyphipterix argophracta Meyrick, 1926 (South Africa)
- Glyphipterix argyrea Arita, 1983 (Thailand)
- Glyphipterix argyrelata (Turner, 1932) (Australia)
- Glyphipterix argyroguttella Ragonot, 1885 (France, Italy, Russia)
- Glyphipterix argyromis Meyrick, 1907 (India & Sri Lanka)
- Glyphipterix argyrosema
- Glyphipterix argyrotoxa
- Glyphipterix asterias
- Glyphipterix asteriella Meyrick, 1880 (Australia)
- Glyphipterix astrapaea
- Glyphipterix ataracta
- Glyphipterix atelura
- Glyphipterix aulogramma
- Glyphipterix autoglypta
- Glyphipterix autopetes (Meyrick, 1907) (Australia)
- Glyphipterix bactrias
- Glyphipterix barbata Philpott, 1918 (New Zealand)
- Glyphipterix basifasciata
- Glyphipterix bergstraesserella (Fabricius, 1781) (from Europe)
- Glyphipterix beta
- Glyphipterix bicornis
- Glyphipterix bifasciata
- Glyphipterix bifasciella
- Glyphipterix bizonata
- Glyphipterix bohemani (Zeller, 1852) (South Africa)
- Glyphipterix brachydelta
- Glyphipterix brevimucronata Sahoo, 2026 (India: Assam)
- Glyphipterix californiae (Walsingham, 1881) (North America)
- Glyphipterix calliactis
- Glyphipterix callicrossa (Meyrick, 1907) (Australia)
- Glyphipterix callidelta
- Glyphipterix calliscopa
- Glyphipterix callithea Meyrick, 1921 (South Africa)
- Glyphipterix canachodes
- Glyphipterix carenota Meyrick, 1909 (India)
- Glyphipterix caudatella
- Glyphipterix cestrota
- Glyphipterix chalcodaedala
- Glyphipterix chalcostrepta
- Glyphipterix chionosoma
- Glyphipterix chrysallacta
- Glyphipterix chrysoplanetis
- Glyphipterix cionophora
- Glyphipterix circumscriptella
- Glyphipterix clearcha
- Glyphipterix climacaspis Meyrick, 1920 (South Africa)
- Glyphipterix codonias
- Glyphipterix colorata
- Glyphipterix columnaris
- Glyphipterix cometophora
- Glyphipterix compastis
- Glyphipterix conosema
- Glyphipterix convoluta
- Glyphipterix cornigerella
- Glyphipterix crinita
- Glyphipterix crotalotis
- Glyphipterix cultrata
- Glyphipterix cyanochalca (Meyrick, 1882) (Australia)
- Glyphipterix cyanophracta (Meyrick, 1882) (Australia)
- Glyphipterix danilevskii
- Glyphipterix decachrysa Meyrick, 1918 (South Africa)
- Glyphipterix deliciosa
- Glyphipterix delta
- Glyphipterix deltodes
- Glyphipterix deuterastis (Meyrick, 1907) (Australia)
- Glyphipterix diaphora
- Glyphipterix dichalina Meyrick, 1911 (Seychelles)
- Glyphipterix dichorda
- Glyphipterix diplotoxa Meyrick, 1920 (South Africa)
- Glyphipterix ditiorana (Walker, 1863) (India, Asia, Japan, South Africa, Mauritius)
- Glyphipterix dolichophyes
- Glyphipterix dolichophyses
- Glyphipterix drosophaes
- Glyphipterix enclitica
- Glyphipterix epastra
- Glyphipterix equitella
- Glyphipterix erastis
- Glyphipterix erebanassa
- Glyphipterix euastera
- Glyphipterix euthybelemna
- Glyphipterix euleucotoma
- Glyphipterix eumitrella
- Glyphipterix expurgata
- Glyphipterix falcigera
- Glyphipterix formosametron
- Glyphipterix formosensis
- Glyphipterix forsterella (Fabricius, 1781) (Europe, Caucasus, Japan)
- Glyphipterix fortunatella Walsingham, 1908 (Canary islands)
- Glyphipterix funditrix
- Glyphipterix fuscoviridella
- Glyphipterix gamma
- Glyphipterix gaudialis
- Glyphipterix gemmatella (Walker, 1864) (Congo, Gabon, Sierra Leone, Uganda)
- Glyphipterix gemmipunctella
- Glyphipterix gemmula
- Glyphipterix gianelliella
- Glyphipterix gonoteles (Meyrick, 1907) (Australia)
- Glyphipterix grandis Arita & Heppner, 1992
- Glyphipterix grapholithoides (Walsingham, 1891) (South Africa, Congo)
- Glyphipterix gypsonota
- Glyphipterix halimophila Mey, 1991 (Philippines)
- Glyphipterix hannemanni
- Glyphipterix haplographa
- Glyphipterix harpogramma
- Glyphipterix haworthana (Stephens, 1834) (North America)
- Glyphipterix hemipempta
- Glyphipterix heptaglyphella
- Glyphipterix holodesma
- Glyphipterix hologramma
- Glyphipterix hyperlampra
- Glyphipterix idiomorpha Meyrick, 1917 (South Africa)
- Glyphipterix imparfasciata
- Glyphipterix indomita
- Glyphipterix invicta
- Glyphipterix iocheaera
- Glyphipterix ioclista
- Glyphipterix iometalla Meyrick, 1880 (Australia)
- Glyphipterix isoclista
- Glyphipterix isozela (Meyrick, 1907) (Australia)
- Glyphipterix issikii
- Glyphipterix japonicella
- Glyphipterix juncivora Heppner, 198 (North America)
- Glyphipterix lamprocoma (Meyrick, 1907) (Australia)
- Glyphipterix lamprosema
- Glyphipterix leptocona
- Glyphipterix leptosema
- Glyphipterix leucocerastes
- Glyphipterix leucophragma
- Glyphipterix leucoplaca
- Glyphipterix lineovalvae
- Glyphipterix loricatella (Treitschke, 1833) (from Hungary)
- Glyphipterix lunaris
- Glyphipterix luteocapitella
- Glyphipterix luteomaculata
- Glyphipterix lycnophora
- Glyphipterix macrantha
- Glyphipterix macraula (Meyrick, 1907) (Australia)
- Glyphipterix macrodrachma
- Glyphipterix maculata
- Glyphipterix madagascariensis Viette, 1951 (Madagascar, Réunion)
- Glyphipterix magnatella
- Glyphipterix marinae
- Glyphipterix maritima
- Glyphipterix marmaropa
- Glyphipterix maschalis
- Glyphipterix medica Meyrick, 1911 (Seychelles & South Africa)
- Glyphipterix melania
- Glyphipterix mesaula (Meyrick, 1907) (Australia)
- Glyphipterix metasticta
- Glyphipterix meteora
- Glyphipterix metron
- Glyphipterix metronoma (Meyrick, 1907) (Australia)
- Glyphipterix mikadonis
- Glyphipterix miniata
- Glyphipterix molybdastra Meyrick, 1923 (from Angola)
- Glyphipterix molybdora
- Glyphipterix monodonta
- Glyphipterix montisella Chambers, 1875 (North America)
- Glyphipterix morangella
- Glyphipterix moriutii Arita, 1983 (Thailand)
- Glyphipterix necopina
- Glyphipterix neochorda
- Glyphipterix nephoptera
- Glyphipterix nicaeella Möschler, 1866 (from Europe)
- Glyphipterix nigromarginata
- Glyphipterix nugella
- Glyphipterix octatoma
- Glyphipterix octonaria
- Glyphipterix okui
- Glyphipterix oligastra
- Glyphipterix orthodeta
- Glyphipterix ortholeuca Meyrick, 1921 (South Africa)
- Glyphipterix orthomacha
- Glyphipterix orymagdis
- Glyphipterix oxycopis Meyrick, 1918 (India, Sri Lanka)
- Glyphipterix oxymachaera (Meyrick, 1880) (New Zealand)
- Glyphipterix oxytricha Meyrick, 1928 (South Africa)
- Glyphipterix palaeomorpha
- Glyphipterix palpella
- Glyphipterix paradisea
- Glyphipterix parazona
- Glyphipterix perfracta
- Glyphipterix perimetalla
- Glyphipterix persica Diakonoff, 1979 (Iran)
- Glyphipterix pertenuis Diakonoff, 1979 (Tunesia)
- Glyphipterix pharetropis
- Glyphipterix phosphora (Meyrick, 1907) (Australia)
- Glyphipterix plagiographa Bradley, 1965 (Uganda)
- Glyphipterix platydisema
- Glyphipterix platyochra
- Glyphipterix polychroa
- Glyphipterix polyzela
- Glyphipterix protomacra (Meyrick, 1907) (Australia)
- Glyphipterix protoscleriae
- Glyphipterix pseudogamma
- Glyphipterix pseudomelania
- Glyphipterix pseudostoma
- Glyphipterix pseudotaiwana
- Glyphipterix psychopa
- Glyphipterix purpurea Arita, 1983 (Thailand)
- Glyphipterix pygmaeella
- Glyphipterix pyrogastra
- Glyphipterix pyrophora
- Glyphipterix quadragintapunctata
- Glyphipterix refractella
- Glyphipterix regula
- Glyphipterix reikoae
- Glyphipterix rhanteria
- Glyphipterix rhinoceropa Meyrick, 1935 (from China)
- Glyphipterix rhodanis
- Glyphipterix rugata
- Glyphipterix sabella Newman, 1856 (Australia)
- Glyphipterix saurodonta
- Glyphipterix schoenicolella
- Glyphipterix scintilella
- Glyphipterix scintilla
- Glyphipterix scleriae
- Glyphipterix sclerodes Meyrick, 1909 (Sri Lanka)
- Glyphipterix scolias
- Glyphipterix semiflavana
- Glyphipterix semilunaris Wollaston E., 1879 (from St.Helena)
- Glyphipterix semisparsa
- Glyphipterix septemstrigella
- Glyphipterix siamensis Arita, 1983 (Thailand)
- Glyphipterix silvestris Arita, 1983 (Thailand)
- Glyphipterix similis
- Glyphipterix simplicella
- Glyphipterix simpliciella
- Glyphipterix sistes Heppner, 1985 (North America)
- Glyphipterix speculiferella
- Glyphipterix stasichlora
- Glyphipterix stelucha Meyrick, 1909 (from South Africa)
- Glyphipterix stilata
- Glyphipterix sulcosa
- Glyphipterix synarma
- Glyphipterix syndecta
- Glyphipterix synorista
- Glyphipterix taiwana
- Glyphipterix tenuis
- Glyphipterix tetrachrysa Meyrick, 1907 (Sri Lanka)
- Glyphipterix tetrasema
- Glyphipterix thrasonella (Scopoli, 1763) (from Europe)
- Glyphipterix tona
- Glyphipterix trigonaspis
- Glyphipterix trigonodes
- Glyphipterix tripedila
- Glyphipterix triplaca
- Glyphipterix triselena
- Glyphipterix tungella
- Glyphipterix umbilici M. Hering, 1927 (Portugal)
- Glyphipterix uncta
- Glyphipterix unguifera
- Glyphipterix urticae Heppner, 1985 (USA)
- Glyphipterix unifasciata
- Glyphipterix variata
- Glyphipterix versicolor
- Glyphipterix virgata
- Glyphipterix voluptella
- Glyphipterix xanthoplecta
- Glyphipterix xestobela (Meyrick, 1888) (New Zealand)
- Glyphipterix xyridota
- Glyphipterix zalodisca
- Glyphipterix zelota

== Selected former species ==
- Glyphipterix plenella
