= Glyphipterix dolichophyes =

Scientific classification
- Kingdom: Animalia
- Phylum: Arthropoda
- Clade: Pancrustacea
- Class: Insecta
- Order: Lepidoptera
- Family: Glyphipterigidae
- Genus: Glyphipterix
- Species: G. dolichophyes

Binomial name
- Glyphipterix dolichophyes Diakonoff, 1978

Synonyms
- Glyphipteryx xyridota Meyrick, 1935 (nec 1918); Glyphipteryx oxydonta Diakonoff, 1978

Species of moth

Glyphipterix dolichophyes is a species of sedge moth in the genus Glyphipterix. It was described by Alexey Diakonoff in 1978. It is found in China (Lungtan, Hungshan, western Tien-mu-shan).
