= Glyphipterix saurodonta =

Scientific classification
- Kingdom: Animalia
- Phylum: Arthropoda
- Clade: Pancrustacea
- Class: Insecta
- Order: Lepidoptera
- Family: Glyphipterigidae
- Genus: Glyphipterix
- Species: G. saurodonta

Binomial name
- Glyphipterix saurodonta Meyrick, 1913

Species of moth

Glyphipterix saurodonta is a species of sedge moth in the genus Glyphipterix. It was described by Edward Meyrick in 1913. It is found in North America.
