= Glyphipterix argyrotoxa =

Scientific classification
- Kingdom: Animalia
- Phylum: Arthropoda
- Clade: Pancrustacea
- Class: Insecta
- Order: Lepidoptera
- Family: Glyphipterigidae
- Genus: Glyphipterix
- Species: G. argyrotoxa

Binomial name
- Glyphipterix argyrotoxa Turner, 1913

Species of moth

Glyphipterix argyrotoxa is a species of sedge moths in the genus Glyphipterix. It was described by Alfred Jefferis Turner in 1913. It is found in Australia, including Queensland.
