= Glyphipterix lamprosema =

Scientific classification
- Kingdom: Animalia
- Phylum: Arthropoda
- Clade: Pancrustacea
- Class: Insecta
- Order: Lepidoptera
- Family: Glyphipterigidae
- Genus: Glyphipterix
- Species: G. lamprosema

Binomial name
- Glyphipterix lamprosema Turner, 1926

Species of moth

Glyphipterix lamprosema is a species of sedge moth in the genus Glyphipterix. It was described by Alfred Jefferis Turner in 1926. It is found in Australia, including New South Wales.
