= Glyphipterix amphipeda =

Scientific classification
- Kingdom: Animalia
- Phylum: Arthropoda
- Clade: Pancrustacea
- Class: Insecta
- Order: Lepidoptera
- Family: Glyphipterigidae
- Genus: Glyphipterix
- Species: G. amphipeda

Binomial name
- Glyphipterix amphipeda Meyrick, 1920

Species of moth

Glyphipterix amphipeda is a moth in the family Glyphipterigidae known to be native to South Africa.
