= Glyphipterix eumitrella =

Scientific classification
- Kingdom: Animalia
- Phylum: Arthropoda
- Clade: Pancrustacea
- Class: Insecta
- Order: Lepidoptera
- Family: Glyphipterigidae
- Genus: Glyphipterix
- Species: G. eumitrella

Binomial name
- Glyphipterix eumitrella Busck, 1914

Species of moth

Glyphipterix eumitrella is a species of sedge moth in the genus Glyphipterix. It was described by August Busck in 1914. It is found in Panama.
