= Glyphipterix ametris =

Scientific classification
- Kingdom: Animalia
- Phylum: Arthropoda
- Clade: Pancrustacea
- Class: Insecta
- Order: Lepidoptera
- Family: Glyphipterigidae
- Genus: Glyphipterix
- Species: G. ametris

Binomial name
- Glyphipterix ametris Diakonoff, 1979

Species of moth

Glyphipterix ametris is a species of sedge moth in the genus Glyphipterix. It was described by Alexey Diakonoff in 1979. It is found in Taiwan.
