= Glyphipterix astrapaea =

Scientific classification
- Kingdom: Animalia
- Phylum: Arthropoda
- Clade: Pancrustacea
- Class: Insecta
- Order: Lepidoptera
- Family: Glyphipterigidae
- Genus: Glyphipterix
- Species: G. astrapaea

Binomial name
- Glyphipterix astrapaea Meyrick, 1880

Species of moth

Glyphipterix astrapaea is a species of sedge moth in the genus Glyphipterix. It was first described by Edward Meyrick in 1880. It is endemic to New Zealand.
