= Glyphipterix scolias =

Scientific classification
- Kingdom: Animalia
- Phylum: Arthropoda
- Clade: Pancrustacea
- Class: Insecta
- Order: Lepidoptera
- Family: Glyphipterigidae
- Genus: Glyphipterix
- Species: G. scolias

Binomial name
- Glyphipterix scolias Meyrick, 1910

Species of moth

Glyphipterix scolias is a species of sedge moth in the genus Glyphipterix. It was described by Edward Meyrick in 1910. It is found on the Kermadec Islands.
