= Glyphipterix voluptella =

Scientific classification
- Kingdom: Animalia
- Phylum: Arthropoda
- Clade: Pancrustacea
- Class: Insecta
- Order: Lepidoptera
- Family: Glyphipterigidae
- Genus: Glyphipterix
- Species: G. voluptella

Binomial name
- Glyphipterix voluptella Felder, 1875

Species of moth

Glyphipterix voluptella is a species of sedge moth in the genus Glyphipterix. It was described by Felder in 1875. It is found in Brazil.
