= Glyphipterix grapholithoides =

Scientific classification
- Kingdom: Animalia
- Phylum: Arthropoda
- Clade: Pancrustacea
- Class: Insecta
- Order: Lepidoptera
- Family: Glyphipterigidae
- Genus: Glyphipterix
- Species: G. grapholithoides

Binomial name
- Glyphipterix grapholithoides (Walsingham, 1891)

Synonyms
- Glyphipteryx grapholithoides Walsingham, 1891

Species of moth

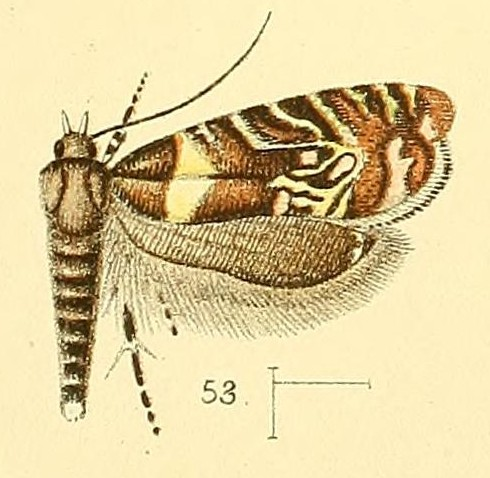
Glyphipterix grapholithoides

Glyphipterix grapholithoides is a moth in the family Glyphipterigidae. It is known from South Africa.
