= Glyphipterix dichalina =

Scientific classification
- Kingdom: Animalia
- Phylum: Arthropoda
- Clade: Pancrustacea
- Class: Insecta
- Order: Lepidoptera
- Family: Glyphipterigidae
- Genus: Glyphipterix
- Species: G. dichalina

Binomial name
- Glyphipterix dichalina Meyrick, 1911

Species of moth

Glyphipterix dichalina is a moth in the family Glyphipterigidae. It is known from the Seychelles.
