= Glyphipterix idiomorpha =

Scientific classification
- Kingdom: Animalia
- Phylum: Arthropoda
- Clade: Pancrustacea
- Class: Insecta
- Order: Lepidoptera
- Family: Glyphipterigidae
- Genus: Glyphipterix
- Species: G. idiomorpha

Binomial name
- Glyphipterix idiomorpha Meyrick, 1917

Species of moth

Glyphipterix idiomorpha is a moth in the family Glyphipterigidae that lives in South Africa.
