= Glyphipterix palpella =

Scientific classification
- Kingdom: Animalia
- Phylum: Arthropoda
- Clade: Pancrustacea
- Class: Insecta
- Order: Lepidoptera
- Family: Glyphipterigidae
- Genus: Glyphipterix
- Species: G. palpella

Binomial name
- Glyphipterix palpella Walsingham, 1914

Species of moth

Glyphipterix palpella is a species of sedge moth in the genus Glyphipterix. It was described by Walsingham in 1914. It is found in Central America.
