= Glyphipterix acinacella =

Scientific classification
- Kingdom: Animalia
- Phylum: Arthropoda
- Clade: Pancrustacea
- Class: Insecta
- Order: Lepidoptera
- Family: Glyphipterigidae
- Genus: Glyphipterix
- Species: G. acinacella

Binomial name
- Glyphipterix acinacella Meyrick, 1882

Species of moth

Glyphipterix acinacella is a species of sedge moth in the genus Glyphipterix. It was described by Edward Meyrick in 1882. It is found in Victoria and Queensland.

Adults are black or brown with an iridescent silver line across the forewing. The hindwings are plain brown.
