= Glyphipterix compastis =

Scientific classification
- Kingdom: Animalia
- Phylum: Arthropoda
- Clade: Pancrustacea
- Class: Insecta
- Order: Lepidoptera
- Family: Glyphipterigidae
- Genus: Glyphipterix
- Species: G. compastis

Binomial name
- Glyphipterix compastis Meyrick, 1923

Species of moth

Glyphipterix compastis is a species of sedge moths in the genus Glyphipterix. It was described by Edward Meyrick in 1923. It is found in India (Assam).
