= Glyphipterix autoglypta =

Scientific classification
- Kingdom: Animalia
- Phylum: Arthropoda
- Clade: Pancrustacea
- Class: Insecta
- Order: Lepidoptera
- Family: Glyphipterigidae
- Genus: Glyphipterix
- Species: G. autoglypta

Binomial name
- Glyphipterix autoglypta Meyrick, 1921

Species of moth

Glyphipterix autoglypta is a species of sedge moths in the genus Glyphipterix. It was described by Edward Meyrick in 1921. It is found on Java.
