= Glyphipterix phosphora =

Scientific classification
- Kingdom: Animalia
- Phylum: Arthropoda
- Clade: Pancrustacea
- Class: Insecta
- Order: Lepidoptera
- Family: Glyphipterigidae
- Genus: Glyphipterix
- Species: G. phosphora

Binomial name
- Glyphipterix phosphora Meyrick, 1907

Species of insect

Glyphipterix phosphora is a species of sedge moth in the genus Glyphipterix. It was described by Edward Meyrick in 1907. It is found in South Australia.
