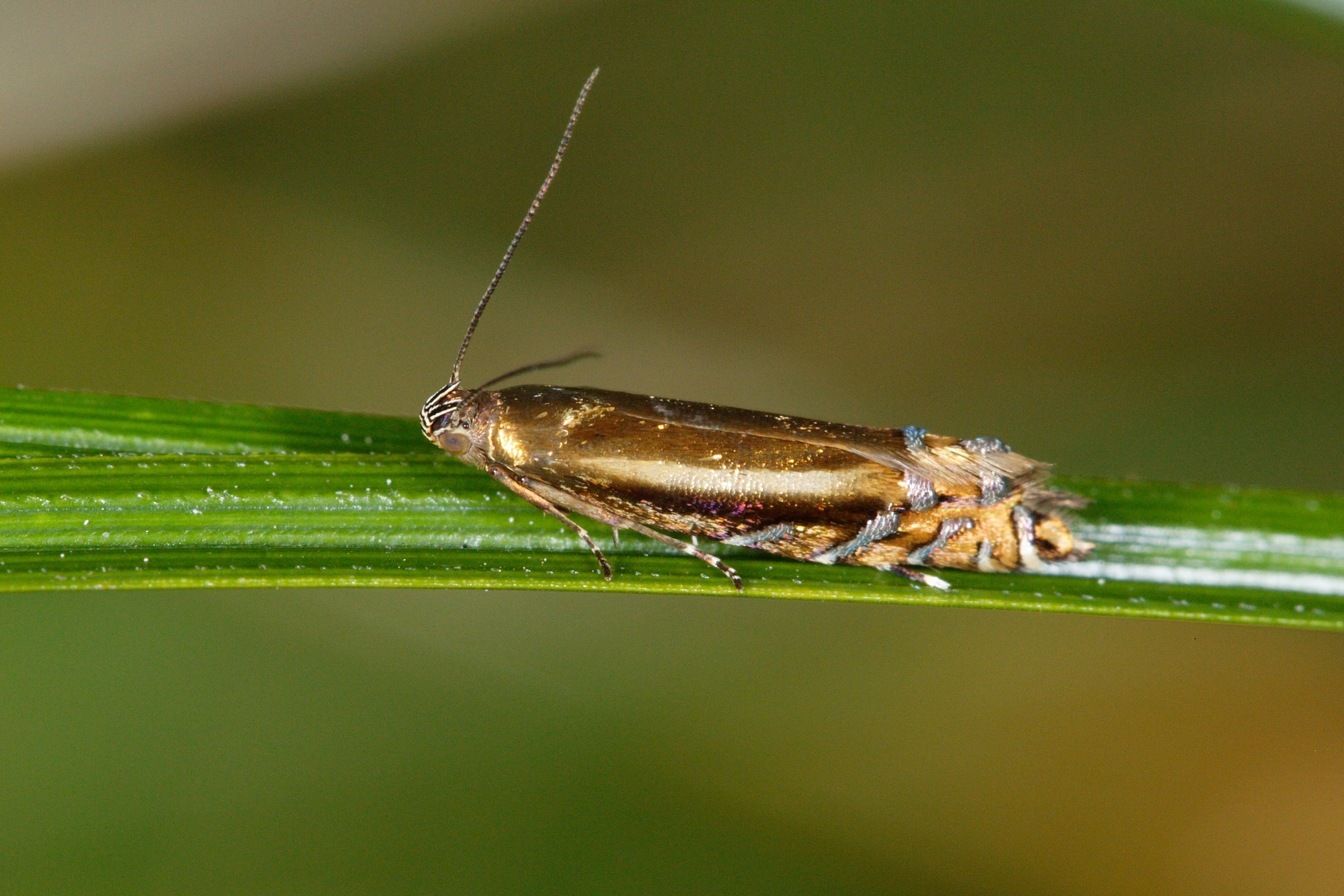

Scientific classification
- Kingdom: Animalia
- Phylum: Arthropoda
- Clade: Pancrustacea
- Class: Insecta
- Order: Lepidoptera
- Family: Glyphipterigidae
- Genus: Glyphipterix
- Species: G. scintelella

Binomial name
- Glyphipterix scintelella Walker, 1864

Synonyms
- Argyresthia transversella Walker, 1864; Glyphipterix transversella

= Glyphipterix scintilella =

Species of moth

Glyphipterix scintelella is a species of sedge moth in the genus Glyphipterix. It was described by Francis Walker in 1864 and named Glyphiterix scintelella. It is endemic to New Zealand. The larvae of this species mine sedge tillers.
