= Glyphipterix syndecta =

Scientific classification
- Kingdom: Animalia
- Phylum: Arthropoda
- Clade: Pancrustacea
- Class: Insecta
- Order: Lepidoptera
- Family: Glyphipterigidae
- Genus: Glyphipterix
- Species: G. syndecta

Binomial name
- Glyphipterix syndecta Meyrick, 1915

Species of moth

Glyphipterix syndecta is a species of sedge moth in the genus Glyphipterix. It was described by Edward Meyrick in 1915. It is found in Peru.
