= Glyphipterix luteocapitella =

Scientific classification
- Kingdom: Animalia
- Phylum: Arthropoda
- Clade: Pancrustacea
- Class: Insecta
- Order: Lepidoptera
- Family: Glyphipterigidae
- Genus: Glyphipterix
- Species: G. luteocapitella

Binomial name
- Glyphipterix luteocapitella Caradja, 1926

Species of moth

Glyphipterix luteocapitella is a species of sedge moth in the genus Glyphipterix. It was described by Aristide Caradja in 1926. It is found in Russia (Amur).
