= Glyphipterix bifasciella =

Scientific classification
- Kingdom: Animalia
- Phylum: Arthropoda
- Clade: Pancrustacea
- Class: Insecta
- Order: Lepidoptera
- Family: Glyphipterigidae
- Genus: Glyphipterix
- Species: G. bifasciella

Binomial name
- Glyphipterix bifasciella (Amsel, 1959)

Synonyms
- Glyphipteryx bifasciella Amsel, 1959

Species of moth

Glyphipterix bifasciella is a species of sedge moth in the genus Glyphipterix. It was described by Hans Georg Amsel in 1959. It is found in Iraq.
