= Glyphipterix clearcha =

Scientific classification
- Kingdom: Animalia
- Phylum: Arthropoda
- Clade: Pancrustacea
- Class: Insecta
- Order: Lepidoptera
- Family: Glyphipterigidae
- Genus: Glyphipterix
- Species: G. clearcha

Binomial name
- Glyphipterix clearcha Meyrick, 1921

Species of moth

Glyphipterix clearcha is a species of sedge moth in the genus Glyphipterix. It was described by Edward Meyrick in 1921. It is found on Java.
