= Glyphipterix octatoma =

Scientific classification
- Kingdom: Animalia
- Phylum: Arthropoda
- Clade: Pancrustacea
- Class: Insecta
- Order: Lepidoptera
- Family: Glyphipterigidae
- Genus: Glyphipterix
- Species: G. octatoma

Binomial name
- Glyphipterix octatoma Diakonoff, 1978

Species of moth

Glyphipterix octatoma is a species of sedge moth in the genus Glyphipterix. It was described by Alexey Diakonoff in 1978. It is found in China.
