= Glyphipterix polychroa =

Scientific classification
- Kingdom: Animalia
- Phylum: Arthropoda
- Clade: Pancrustacea
- Class: Insecta
- Order: Lepidoptera
- Family: Glyphipterigidae
- Genus: Glyphipterix
- Species: G. polychroa

Binomial name
- Glyphipterix polychroa Lower, 1897

Species of moth

Glyphipterix polychroa is a species of sedge moth in the genus Glyphipterix. It was described by Oswald Bertram Lower in 1897. It is found in Australia, including Victoria.
