= Glyphipterix xyridota =

Scientific classification
- Kingdom: Animalia
- Phylum: Arthropoda
- Clade: Pancrustacea
- Class: Insecta
- Order: Lepidoptera
- Family: Glyphipterigidae
- Genus: Glyphipterix
- Species: G. xyridota

Binomial name
- Glyphipterix xyridota Meyrick, 1918

Species of moth

Glyphipterix xyridota is a species of sedge moth in the genus Glyphipterix. It was described by Edward Meyrick in 1918. It is found in India (Assam).
