= Glyphipterix lycnophora =

Scientific classification
- Kingdom: Animalia
- Phylum: Arthropoda
- Clade: Pancrustacea
- Class: Insecta
- Order: Lepidoptera
- Family: Glyphipterigidae
- Genus: Glyphipterix
- Species: G. lycnophora

Binomial name
- Glyphipterix lycnophora Turner, 1913

Species of moth

Glyphipterix lycnophora is a species of sedge moth in the genus Glyphipterix. It was described by Alfred Jefferis Turner in 1913. It is found in Australia.

The Global Lepidoptera Names Index considers it to be a synonym of Glyphipterix autopetes.
