= Glyphipterix argyrosema =

Scientific classification
- Kingdom: Animalia
- Phylum: Arthropoda
- Clade: Pancrustacea
- Class: Insecta
- Order: Lepidoptera
- Family: Glyphipterigidae
- Genus: Glyphipterix
- Species: G. argyrosema

Binomial name
- Glyphipterix argyrosema (Meyrick, 1880)

Synonyms
- Apistomorpha argyrosema Meyrick, 1880

Species of moth

Glyphipterix argyrosema is a species of sedge moths in the genus Glyphipterix. It is found in eastern Australia, including Tasmania.
