= Glyphipterix rhinoceropa =

Scientific classification
- Kingdom: Animalia
- Phylum: Arthropoda
- Clade: Pancrustacea
- Class: Insecta
- Order: Lepidoptera
- Family: Glyphipterigidae
- Genus: Glyphipterix
- Species: G. rhinoceropa

Binomial name
- Glyphipterix rhinoceropa Meyrick, 1935

Species of moth

Glyphipterix rhinoceropa is a species of sedge moth in the genus Glyphipterix. It was described by Edward Meyrick in 1935. It is found in southern China.
