= Glyphipterix calliscopa =

Scientific classification
- Kingdom: Animalia
- Phylum: Arthropoda
- Clade: Pancrustacea
- Class: Insecta
- Order: Lepidoptera
- Family: Glyphipterigidae
- Genus: Glyphipterix
- Species: G. calliscopa

Binomial name
- Glyphipterix calliscopa (Lower, 1905)

Synonyms
- Glyphipteryx calliscopa Lower, 1905; Glyphipteryx brachyaula Meyrick, 1907; Glyphipterix brachyaula

Species of moth

Glyphipterix calliscopa is a species of sedge moth in the genus Glyphipterix. It was described by Oswald Bertram Lower in 1905. It is found in Australia, including Victoria and Queensland.
