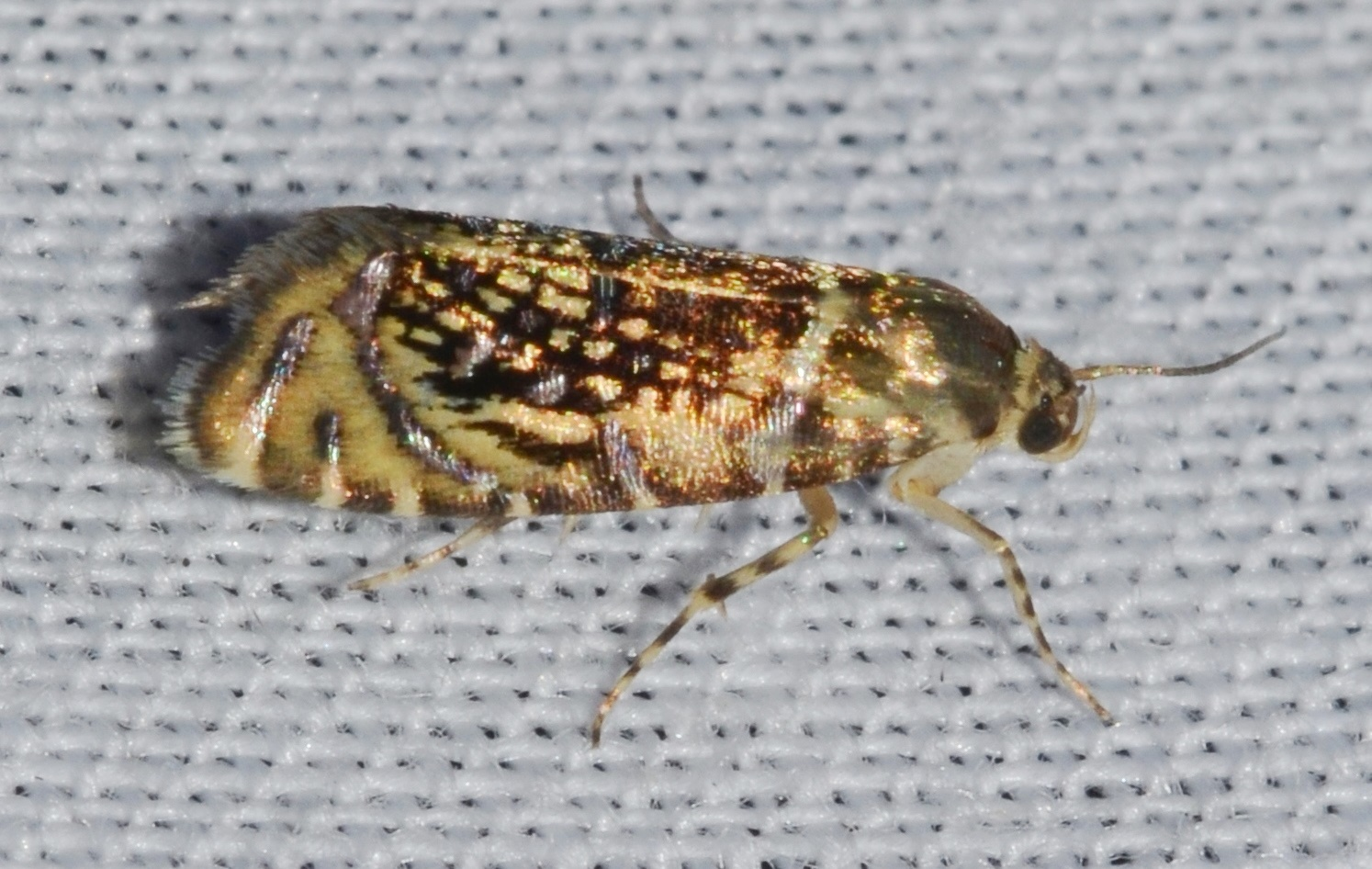

Scientific classification
- Kingdom: Animalia
- Phylum: Arthropoda
- Clade: Pancrustacea
- Class: Insecta
- Order: Lepidoptera
- Family: Glyphipterigidae
- Genus: Glyphipterix
- Species: G. quadragintapunctata

Binomial name
- Glyphipterix quadragintapunctata Dyar, 1900

= Glyphipterix quadragintapunctata =

Species of moth

Glyphipterix quadragintapunctata is a species of sedge moth in the genus Glyphipterix. It was described by Harrison Gray Dyar, Jr. in 1900. It is found in North America, including Illinois, Kentucky, North Carolina, Ohio, Pennsylvania and West Virginia. The habitat consists of low, shaded deciduous forest.
