= Glyphipterix holodesma =

Scientific classification
- Kingdom: Animalia
- Phylum: Arthropoda
- Clade: Pancrustacea
- Class: Insecta
- Order: Lepidoptera
- Family: Glyphipterigidae
- Genus: Glyphipterix
- Species: G. holodesma

Binomial name
- Glyphipterix holodesma Meyrick, 1882

Species of moth

Glyphipterix holodesma is a species of sedge moth in the genus Glyphipterix. It was described by Edward Meyrick in 1882. It is found in Australia, including Tasmania.
