= Glyphipterix ortholeuca =

Scientific classification
- Kingdom: Animalia
- Phylum: Arthropoda
- Clade: Pancrustacea
- Class: Insecta
- Order: Lepidoptera
- Family: Glyphipterigidae
- Genus: Glyphipterix
- Species: G. ortholeuca

Binomial name
- Glyphipterix ortholeuca Meyrick, 1921

Species of moth

Glyphipterix ortholeuca is a moth in the family Glyphipterigidae. It is known from South Africa.

The wingspan is about 11 mm. The forewings are dark bronzy-fuscous with an erect somewhat pointed whitish streak from the dorsum at one-fourth, reaching three-fourths across the wing. The markings are prismatic violet-blue-metallic, finely black-edged. There are six slender streaks rising from white dots on the costa, the first at one-third somewhat oblique, reaching half across the wing, the others direct, the second shorter, the third and fourth reaching nearly half across the wing, the last two short. A rather short erect streak is found from the dorsum beyond the middle, and one from before the tornus reaching half across the wing. There is a dot in the disc beyond the middle, one towards the termen above the middle, two on lower part of the termen, and one on the termen beneath the apex. The hindwings are dark grey.
