= Glyphipterix halimophila =

Scientific classification
- Kingdom: Animalia
- Phylum: Arthropoda
- Clade: Pancrustacea
- Class: Insecta
- Order: Lepidoptera
- Family: Glyphipterigidae
- Genus: Glyphipterix
- Species: G. halimophila

Binomial name
- Glyphipterix halimophila (Lower, 1893)

Synonyms
- Glyphipteryx halimophila Lower, 1893

Species of moth

Glyphipterix halimophila is a species of sedge moth in the genus Glyphipterix. It was described by Oswald Bertram Lower in 1893. It is found in south-eastern and western Australia.
