= Glyphipterix oligastra =

Scientific classification
- Kingdom: Animalia
- Phylum: Arthropoda
- Clade: Pancrustacea
- Class: Insecta
- Order: Lepidoptera
- Family: Glyphipterigidae
- Genus: Glyphipterix
- Species: G. oligastra

Binomial name
- Glyphipterix oligastra Meyrick, 1926

Species of moth

Glyphipterix oligastra is a species of sedge moth in the genus Glyphipterix. It was described by Edward Meyrick in 1926. It is found in Colombia.
