= Glyphipterix hyperlampra =

Scientific classification
- Kingdom: Animalia
- Phylum: Arthropoda
- Clade: Pancrustacea
- Class: Insecta
- Order: Lepidoptera
- Family: Glyphipterigidae
- Genus: Glyphipterix
- Species: G. hyperlampra

Binomial name
- Glyphipterix hyperlampra Turner, 1913

Species of moth

Glyphipterix hyperlampra is a species of sedge moth in the genus Glyphipterix. It was described by Alfred Jefferis Turner in 1913. It is found in Australia.
