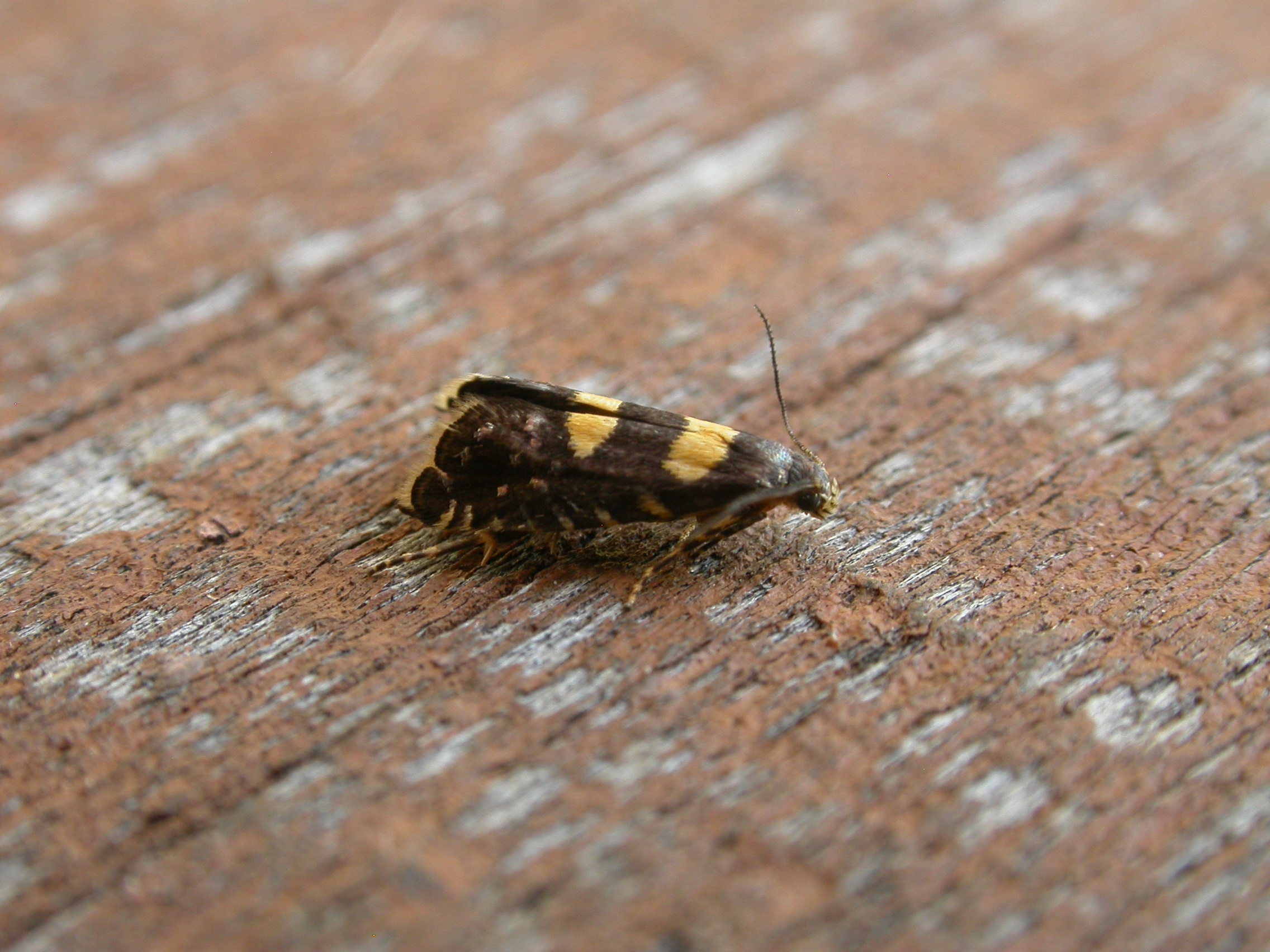

Scientific classification
- Kingdom: Animalia
- Phylum: Arthropoda
- Clade: Pancrustacea
- Class: Insecta
- Order: Lepidoptera
- Family: Glyphipterigidae
- Genus: Glyphipterix
- Species: G. chrysoplanetis

Binomial name
- Glyphipterix chrysoplanetis (Meyrick, 1880)

Synonyms
- Glyphipteryx chrysoplanetis Meyrick, 1880

= Glyphipterix chrysoplanetis =

Species of moth

Glyphipterix chrysoplanetis is a moth of the family Glyphipterigidae. It is known from Australia, including New South Wales, Queensland and Victoria
