= Glyphipterix stasichlora =

Scientific classification
- Kingdom: Animalia
- Phylum: Arthropoda
- Clade: Pancrustacea
- Class: Insecta
- Order: Lepidoptera
- Family: Glyphipterigidae
- Genus: Glyphipterix
- Species: G. stasichlora

Binomial name
- Glyphipterix stasichlora Meyrick, 1931

Species of moth

Glyphipterix stasichlora is a species of sedge moth in the genus Glyphipterix. It was described by Edward Meyrick in 1931. It is found in Peru.
