= Glyphipterix cultrata =

Scientific classification
- Kingdom: Animalia
- Phylum: Arthropoda
- Clade: Pancrustacea
- Class: Insecta
- Order: Lepidoptera
- Family: Glyphipterigidae
- Genus: Glyphipterix
- Species: G. cultrata

Binomial name
- Glyphipterix cultrata Meyrick, 1912

Species of moth

Glyphipterix cultrata is a species of sedge moth in the genus Glyphipterix. It was described by Edward Meyrick in 1912. It is found in India (Assam).
