= Glyphipterix semisparsa =

Scientific classification
- Kingdom: Animalia
- Phylum: Arthropoda
- Clade: Pancrustacea
- Class: Insecta
- Order: Lepidoptera
- Family: Glyphipterigidae
- Genus: Glyphipterix
- Species: G. semisparsa

Binomial name
- Glyphipterix semisparsa Meyrick, 1917

Species of moth

Glyphipterix semisparsa is a species of sedge moth in the genus Glyphipterix. It was described by Edward Meyrick in 1917. It is found in India.
