= Glyphipterix alpha =

Scientific classification
- Kingdom: Animalia
- Phylum: Arthropoda
- Clade: Pancrustacea
- Class: Insecta
- Order: Lepidoptera
- Family: Glyphipterigidae
- Genus: Glyphipterix
- Species: G. alpha

Binomial name
- Glyphipterix alpha Moriuti & Saito, 1964

Species of moth

Glyphipterix alpha is a species of sedge moth in the genus Glyphipterix. It was described by Sigeru Moriuti and Tosihisa Saito in 1964. It is found in Honshu, Japan.

The wingspan is 9–10 mm.
