= Glyphipterix haplographa =

Scientific classification
- Kingdom: Animalia
- Phylum: Arthropoda
- Clade: Pancrustacea
- Class: Insecta
- Order: Lepidoptera
- Family: Glyphipterigidae
- Genus: Glyphipterix
- Species: G. haplographa

Binomial name
- Glyphipterix haplographa (Turner, 1927)

Synonyms
- Glyphipteryx haplographa Turner, 1927

Species of moth

Glyphipterix haplographa is a species of sedge moth in the genus Glyphipterix. It was described by Turner in 1926. It is found in Australia, including Tasmania.

The wingspan is about 10 mm. The forewings are blackish with two slender white transverse fasciae, the first at one-third and the second at two-thirds. There is a white costal dot before the apex, partly in the cilia. The hindwings are grey.
