= Glyphipterix archimedica =

Scientific classification
- Kingdom: Animalia
- Phylum: Arthropoda
- Clade: Pancrustacea
- Class: Insecta
- Order: Lepidoptera
- Family: Glyphipterigidae
- Genus: Glyphipterix
- Species: G. archimedica

Binomial name
- Glyphipterix archimedica Meyrick, 1921

Species of moth

Glyphipterix archimedica is a moth in the family Glyphipterigidae. It is known from Zimbabwe.

The wingspan is about 8 mm. The forewings are bronzy-fuscous, the margins of the wing suffused with dark fuscous and the markings edged with dark fuscous suffusion. A slightly oblique whitish fasciate streak is found from the dorsum at one-fourth reaching more than half across the wing and there is a triangular whitish spot on the dorsum beyond the middle, its apex produced into a golden-metallic projection. Four equidistant somewhat oblique slender whitish streaks run from the costa, becoming violet-golden-metallic downwards, the first from before the middle, reaching nearly half across the wing, the second somewhat longer, third as long as the first, the fourth pre-apical, shorter and direct. There is an erect slender violet-golden-metallic streak rising from a pre-tornal whitish dot, almost touching the apex of the second costal streak and a slender violet-golden-metallic streak runs along the lower half of the termen, and an erect mark from the termen beneath the apex. The hindwings are grey.
