= Glyphipterix argophracta =

Scientific classification
- Kingdom: Animalia
- Phylum: Arthropoda
- Clade: Pancrustacea
- Class: Insecta
- Order: Lepidoptera
- Family: Glyphipterigidae
- Genus: Glyphipterix
- Species: G. argophracta

Binomial name
- Glyphipterix argophracta Meyrick, 1926

Synonyms
- Glyphipterix argyrophracta

Species of moth

Glyphipterix argophracta is a moth in the family Glyphipterigidae. It is known from South Africa.
