= Glyphipterix lineovalvae =

Scientific classification
- Kingdom: Animalia
- Phylum: Arthropoda
- Clade: Pancrustacea
- Class: Insecta
- Order: Lepidoptera
- Family: Glyphipterigidae
- Genus: Glyphipterix
- Species: G. lineovalvae

Binomial name
- Glyphipterix lineovalvae Arita & Heppner, 1992

Species of moth

Glyphipterix lineovalvae is a species of sedge moth in the genus Glyphipterix. It was described by Yutaka Arita and John B. Heppner in 1992. The species is found in Taiwan.
