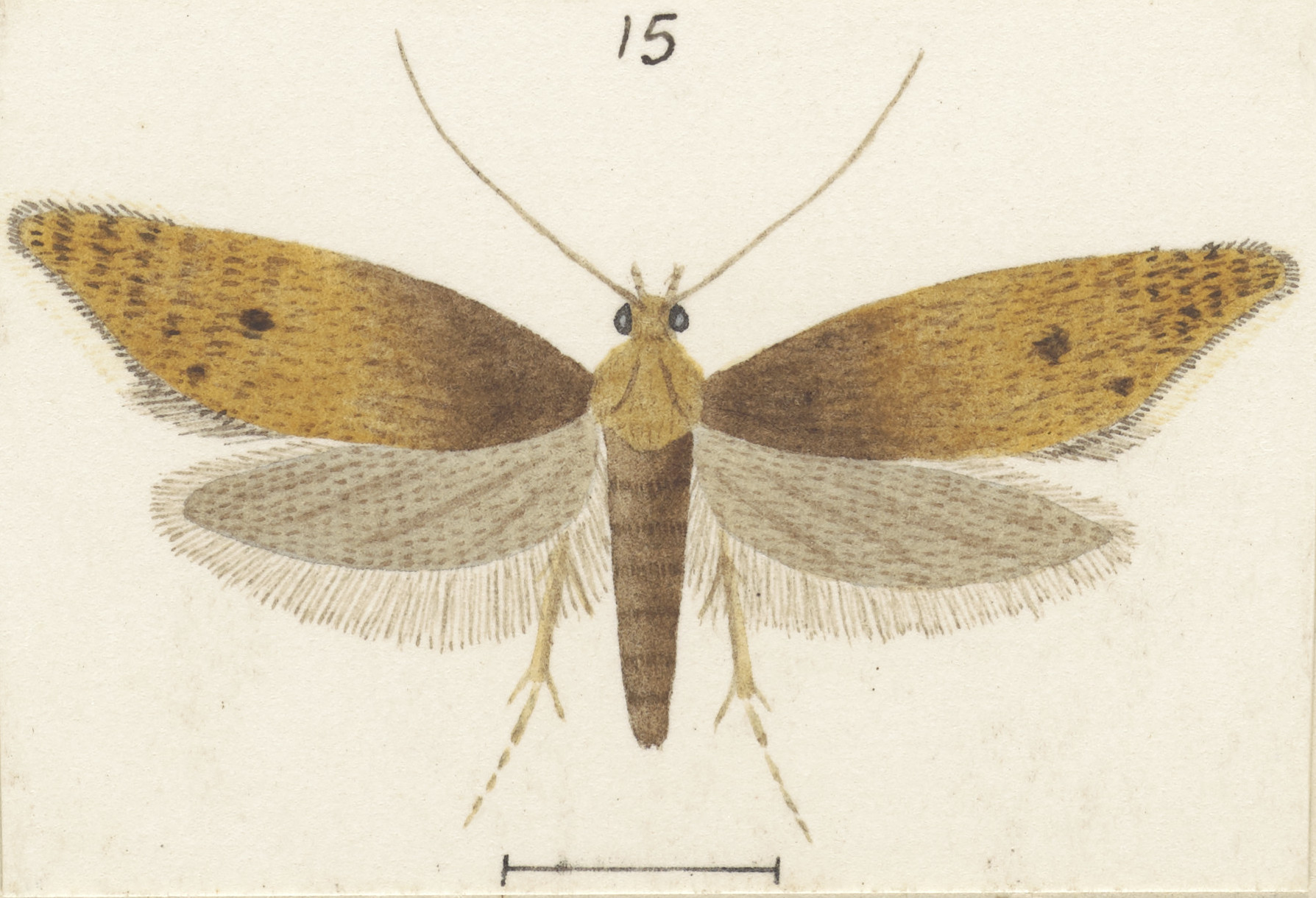
- Illustration of male

Scientific classification
- Kingdom: Animalia
- Phylum: Arthropoda
- Clade: Pancrustacea
- Class: Insecta
- Order: Lepidoptera
- Family: Glyphipterigidae
- Genus: Glyphipterix
- Species: G. metasticta

Binomial name
- Glyphipterix metasticta Meyrick, 1907

= Glyphipterix metasticta =

Species of moth

Glyphipterix metasticta is a species of sedge moth in the genus Glyphipterix. It was first described by Edward Meyrick in 1907. It is endemic to New Zealand.

== Taxonomy ==
This species was first described by Edward Meyrick in 1907. In 1928, in his book The butterflies and moths of New Zealand, George Hudsondiscussed and illustrated this species. The male lectotype specimen, collected in Invercargill by Alfred Philpott, is held at the Natural History Museum, London.

== Description ==
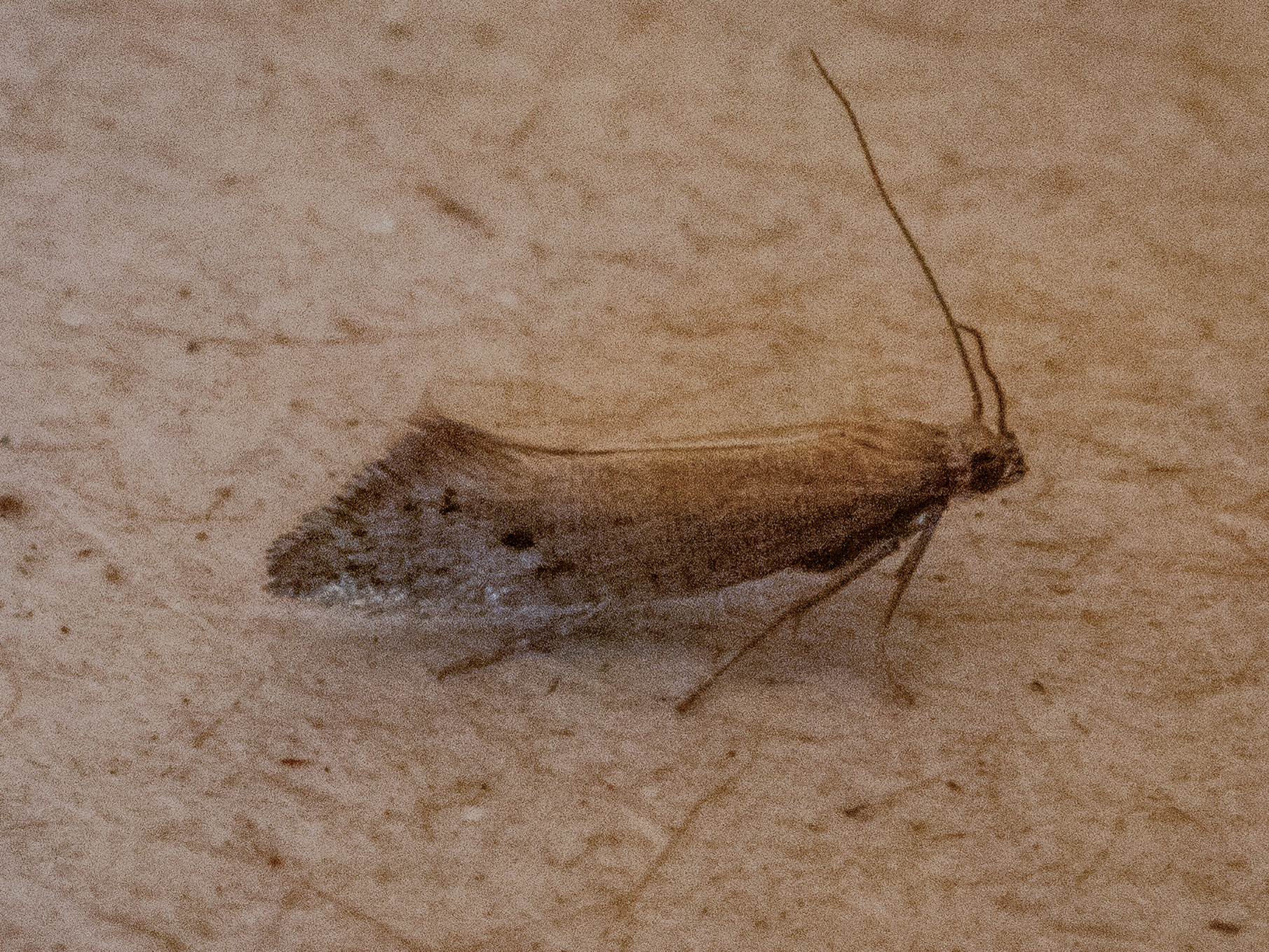
G. metasticta.

Meyrick described this species as follows:

♂♀. 11-12 mm. Head and thorax bronzy - fuscous sprinkled with dark fuscous. Palpi ochreous-whitish, with ctwo rings on second joint, and two rings and an anterior streak on apical portion of terminal joint blackish. Antennae dark fuscous. Abdomen fuscous. Forewings elongate, rather narrow, costa moderately arched, apex round-pointed, termen very obliquely rounded ; 7 and 8 stalked ; in ♂ ochreous-fuscous, sometimes partly suffused with bronzy-ochreous, in ♀ dark fuscous with a cloudy whitish streak along dorsum and posterior half obscurely marked with undefined whitish strigulae, partly edged with blackish ; second discal stigma round, blackish, sometimes with a smaller similar dot before and above it ; two or three short whitish strigulae from costa posteriorly, in ♂ very undefined, in ♀ longer and blackish-edged : cilia fuscous, on termen white with a blackish basal line. Hindwings and cilia rather dark grey, darker in ♀.

== Distribution ==
This species has been observed in the type locality Invercargill, and in Otago.

== Behaviour ==
Adults of the species are on the wing from October until February.

== Habitat ==
This species inhabits marshy locations near the seashore.
