= Glyphipterix drosophaes =

Scientific classification
- Kingdom: Animalia
- Phylum: Arthropoda
- Clade: Pancrustacea
- Class: Insecta
- Order: Lepidoptera
- Family: Glyphipterigidae
- Genus: Glyphipterix
- Species: G. drosophaes

Binomial name
- Glyphipterix drosophaes (Meyrick, 1880)

Synonyms
- Phryganostola drosophaes Meyrick, 1880

Species of moth

Glyphipterix drosophaes is a species of sedge moth in the genus Glyphipterix. It was described by Edward Meyrick in 1880. It is found in Australia, including New South Wales and Tasmania.
