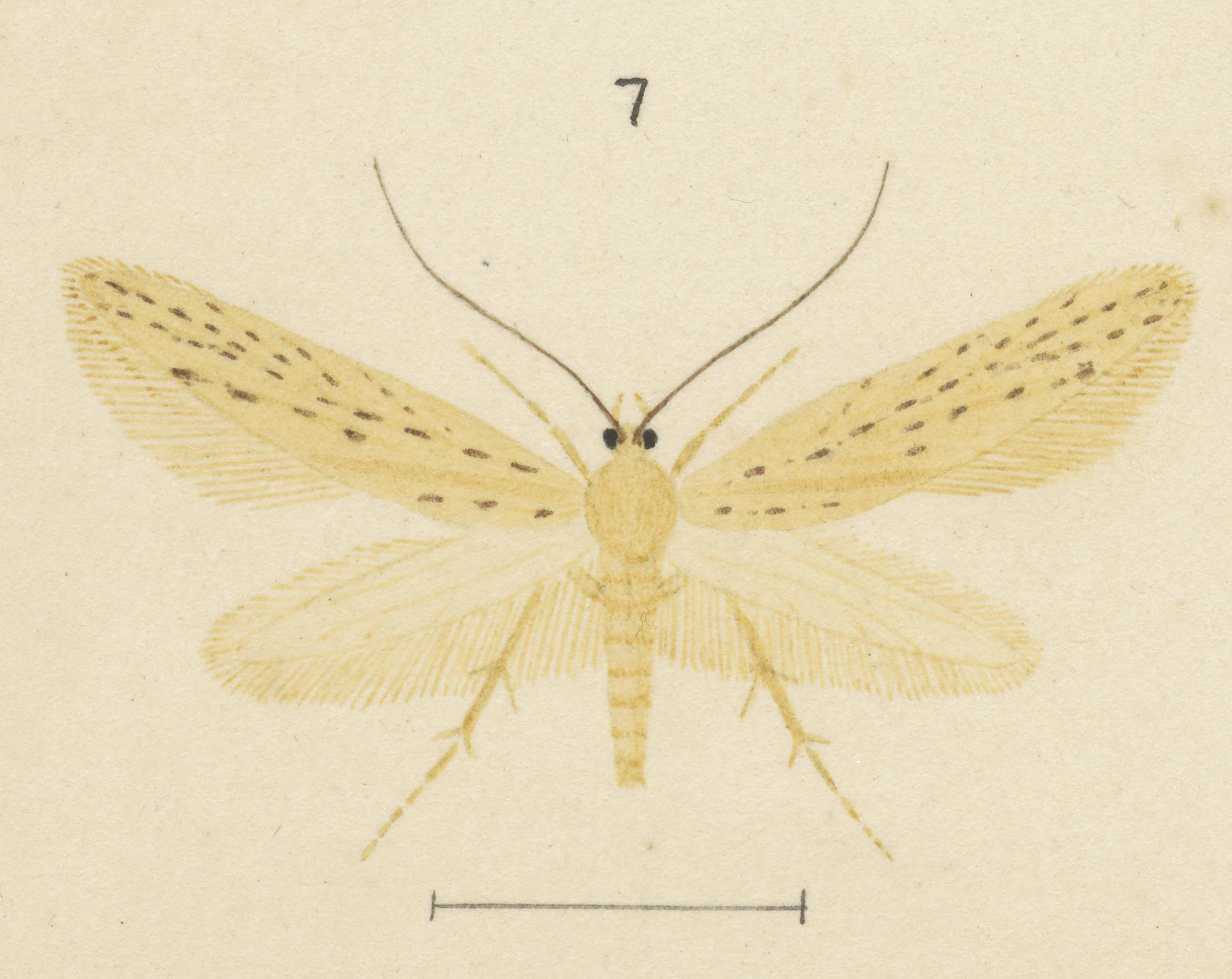
- Illustration of male

Scientific classification
- Kingdom: Animalia
- Phylum: Arthropoda
- Clade: Pancrustacea
- Class: Insecta
- Order: Lepidoptera
- Family: Glyphipterigidae
- Genus: Glyphipterix
- Species: G. ataracta

Binomial name
- Glyphipterix ataracta (Meyrick, 1888)

Synonyms
- Phryganostola ataracta Meyrick, 1888

= Glyphipterix ataracta =

Species of moth

Glyphipterix ataracta is a species of sedge moth in the genus Glyphipterix. It was described by Edward Meyrick in 1888. It is found in New Zealand.
