= Glyphipterix luteomaculata =

Scientific classification
- Kingdom: Animalia
- Phylum: Arthropoda
- Clade: Pancrustacea
- Class: Insecta
- Order: Lepidoptera
- Family: Glyphipterigidae
- Genus: Glyphipterix
- Species: G. luteomaculata

Binomial name
- Glyphipterix luteomaculata Arita, 1979

Species of moth

Glyphipterix luteomaculata is a species of sedge moth in the genus Glyphipterix. It was described by Yutaka Arita in 1979. It is found in Japan (Ryukyu) and Taiwan.

The wingspan 9–13 mm.
