= Glyphipterix monodonta =

Scientific classification
- Kingdom: Animalia
- Phylum: Arthropoda
- Clade: Pancrustacea
- Class: Insecta
- Order: Lepidoptera
- Family: Glyphipterigidae
- Genus: Glyphipterix
- Species: G. monodonta

Binomial name
- Glyphipterix monodonta Diakonoff, 1948

Species of moth

Glyphipterix monodonta is a species of sedge moth in the genus Glyphipterix. It was described by Alexey Diakonoff in 1948. It is found on Buru.
