= Glyphipterix codonias =

Scientific classification
- Kingdom: Animalia
- Phylum: Arthropoda
- Clade: Pancrustacea
- Class: Insecta
- Order: Lepidoptera
- Family: Glyphipterigidae
- Genus: Glyphipterix
- Species: G. codonias

Binomial name
- Glyphipterix codonias Meyrick, 1909

Species of moth

Glyphipterix codonias is a species of sedge moths in the genus Glyphipterix. It was described by Edward Meyrick in 1909. It is found in New Zealand.
