= Glyphipterix leucophragma =

Scientific classification
- Kingdom: Animalia
- Phylum: Arthropoda
- Clade: Pancrustacea
- Class: Insecta
- Order: Lepidoptera
- Family: Glyphipterigidae
- Genus: Glyphipterix
- Species: G. leucophragma

Binomial name
- Glyphipterix leucophragma Meyrick, 1923

Species of moth

Glyphipterix leucophragma is a moth in the family Glyphipterigidae. It is known from Angola.
