= Glyphipterix platydisema =

Scientific classification
- Kingdom: Animalia
- Phylum: Arthropoda
- Clade: Pancrustacea
- Class: Insecta
- Order: Lepidoptera
- Family: Glyphipterigidae
- Genus: Glyphipterix
- Species: G. platydisema

Binomial name
- Glyphipterix platydisema Lower, 1893

Species of moth

Glyphipterix platydisema is a species of sedge moth in the genus Glyphipterix. It was described by Oswald Bertram Lower in 1893. It is found in Australia, including Victoria and Tasmania.
