= Glyphipterix deltodes =

Scientific classification
- Kingdom: Animalia
- Phylum: Arthropoda
- Clade: Pancrustacea
- Class: Insecta
- Order: Lepidoptera
- Family: Glyphipterigidae
- Genus: Glyphipterix
- Species: G. deltodes

Binomial name
- Glyphipterix deltodes Walsingham, 1914

Species of moth

Glyphipterix deltodes is a species of sedge moths in the genus Glyphipterix. It was described by Walsingham in 1914. It is found in Central America.
