= Glyphipterix cyanophracta =

Scientific classification
- Kingdom: Animalia
- Phylum: Arthropoda
- Clade: Pancrustacea
- Class: Insecta
- Order: Lepidoptera
- Family: Glyphipterigidae
- Genus: Glyphipterix
- Species: G. cyanophracta

Binomial name
- Glyphipterix cyanophracta Meyrick, 1882

Species of moth

Glyphipterix cyanophracta is a species of sedge moth in the genus Glyphipterix. It was described by Edward Meyrick in 1882. It is found in Australia, including New South Wales and Victoria.
