= Glyphipterix hannemanni =

Scientific classification
- Kingdom: Animalia
- Phylum: Arthropoda
- Clade: Pancrustacea
- Class: Insecta
- Order: Lepidoptera
- Family: Glyphipterigidae
- Genus: Glyphipterix
- Species: G. hannemanni

Binomial name
- Glyphipterix hannemanni Mey, 1991

Species of moth

Glyphipterix hannemanni is a species of sedge moth in the genus Glyphipterix. It was described by Wolfram Mey in 1991. It is found in the Philippines.
