= Glyphipterix gypsonota =

Scientific classification
- Kingdom: Animalia
- Phylum: Arthropoda
- Clade: Pancrustacea
- Class: Insecta
- Order: Lepidoptera
- Family: Glyphipterigidae
- Genus: Glyphipterix
- Species: G. gypsonota

Binomial name
- Glyphipterix gypsonota (Turner, 1927)

Synonyms
- Glyphipteryx gypsonota Turner, 1927; Glyphipteryx leucargyra Turner, 1927; Glyphipterix leucargyra

Species of moth

Glyphipterix gypsonota is a species of sedge moth in the genus Glyphipterix. It was described by Alfred Jefferis Turner in 1926. It is found in Australia, including Tasmania.

The wingspan is 16–18 mm. The forewings are pale ochreous-grey, with shining silvery-white markings. There are two short, broad, very oblique dorsal streaks, the first from the base to the fold and the second from the middle just crossing the fold. There are also seven fine costal streaks partly edged with dark-fuscous, the first from one-fourth, strongly outwardly-oblique, reaching about half across the wing, the second short and the third from the middle of the costa to the tornus, interrupted in the mid-disc, before the interruption is a white spot. The fourth is sinuate, reaching two-thirds across the disc and the fifth and sixth are very short. The seventh reaches to the terminal incision. There is a streak from the tornus towards, but not reaching the sixth costal streak and there is often some fuscous suffusion in the posterior part of the disc, but no defined markings. The hindwings are grey.
