= List of moths of Australia (Glyphipterigidae) =

Partial list of Australian moths

This is a list of the Australian moth species of the family Glyphipterigidae. It also acts as an index to the species articles and forms part of the full List of moths of Australia.

- Carmentina pyristacta (Turner, 1913)
- Glyphipterix acinacella (Meyrick, 1882)
- Glyphipterix actinobola (Meyrick, 1880)
- Glyphipterix amblycerella (Meyrick, 1882)
- Glyphipterix anaclastis (Meyrick, 1907)
- Glyphipterix argyrelata (Turner, 1932)
- Glyphipterix argyrosema (Meyrick, 1880)
- Glyphipterix argyrotoxa (Turner, 1913)
- Glyphipterix asteriella (Meyrick, 1880)
- Glyphipterix autopetes (Meyrick, 1907)
- Glyphipterix callicrossa (Meyrick, 1907)
- Glyphipterix calliscopa (Lower, 1905)
- Glyphipterix chalcodaedala (Turner, 1913)
- Glyphipterix chalcostrepta (Meyrick, 1907)
- Glyphipterix chrysoplanetis (Meyrick, 1880)
- Glyphipterix cometophora (Meyrick, 1880)
- Glyphipterix cyanochalca (Meyrick, 1882)
- Glyphipterix cyanophracta (Meyrick, 1882)
- Glyphipterix deuterastis (Meyrick, 1907)
- Glyphipterix drosophaes (Meyrick, 1880)
- Glyphipterix euthybelemna (Meyrick, 1880)
- Glyphipterix gemmipunctella (Walker, 1869)
- Glyphipterix gonoteles (Meyrick, 1907)
- Glyphipterix gypsonota (Turner, 1927)
- Glyphipterix halimophila (Lower, 1893)
- Glyphipterix haplographa (Turner, 1927)
- Glyphipterix harpogramma (Turner, 1913)
- Glyphipterix holodesma (Meyrick, 1882)
- Glyphipterix hyperlampra (Turner, 1913)
- Glyphipterix iometalla (Meyrick, 1880)
- Glyphipterix isozela (Meyrick, 1907)
- Glyphipterix lamprocoma (Meyrick, 1907)
- Glyphipterix lamprosema (Turner, 1926)
- Glyphipterix leucocerastes (Meyrick, 1880)
- Glyphipterix leucoplaca (Turner, 1913)
- Glyphipterix macrantha (Lower, 1905)
- Glyphipterix macraula (Meyrick, 1907)
- Glyphipterix marmaropa (Turner, 1913)
- Glyphipterix mesaula (Meyrick, 1907)
- Glyphipterix meteora (Meyrick, 1880)
- Glyphipterix metronoma (Meyrick, 1907)
- Glyphipterix orthomacha (Meyrick, 1920)
- Glyphipterix palaeomorpha (Meyrick, 1880)
- Glyphipterix parazona (Meyrick, 1907)
- Glyphipterix perimetalla (Lower, 1905)
- Glyphipterix pharetropis (Meyrick, 1907)
- Glyphipterix phosphora (Meyrick, 1907)
- Glyphipterix platydisema (Lower, 1893)
- Glyphipterix polychroa (Lower, 1897)
- Glyphipterix polyzela (Meyrick, 1920)
- Glyphipterix protomacra (Meyrick, 1907)
- Glyphipterix pyrophora (Turner, 1913)
- Glyphipterix rhanteria (Turner, 1913)
- Glyphipterix sabella (Newman, 1856)
- Glyphipterix tetrasema (Meyrick, 1882)
- Glyphipterix trigonaspis (Meyrick, 1907)
- Glyphipterix triplaca Meyrick, 1913
