= Glyphipterix brevimucronata =

Scientific classification
- Kingdom: Animalia
- Phylum: Arthropoda
- Clade: Pancrustacea
- Class: Insecta
- Order: Lepidoptera
- Family: Glyphipterigidae
- Genus: Glyphipterix
- Species: G. brevimucronata

Binomial name
- Glyphipterix brevimucronata Sahoo, 2026

Species of moth

Glyphipterix brevimucronata is a moth of the family Glyphipterigidae. It is found in Assam in India. It was described by Kishore Chandra Sahoo in 2026. The specific epithet brevimucronata refers to the short mucronate median projection of the saccus of the male genitalia. It is the first described species of the family Glyphipterigidae from India in more than a century.

== Description ==
The type locality of this species is near the Hoollongapar Gibbon Sanctuary in Assam, India. The only specimen is one male collected on 2 October 2025 at an altitude of 141 meters, with the left wing being faded.

Two records of this species have been found in Karimganj district and Tinsukia district in Assam.

This species is similar to the other members of the genus, for example, Glyphipterix forsterella, Glyphipterix gamma and Glyphipterix semiflavana; however, it can be distinguished by the combination of a large first dorsal streak (narrower in the similar species) and the outwardly curved second dorsal streak. The male genitalia is similar to Glyphipterix okui.

The wingspan of this species is 6.5 mm. The head is glossy fuscous, and the thorax is fuscous brown with smooth scales. The forewing has a brown ground color, with a metallic sheen on the distal third of the wing.

The costal margin has five white streaks, with a silvery-metallic sheen. The first costal streak is outwardly oblique, extending from the middle of the costa. The second costal streak is curved outwardly at an angle, and the third streak is smaller than both the first and the second, terminating before the end of the second streak. The fourth streak is almost perpendicular to the costal margin and is about the same length as the third streak. The fifth streak is the smallest, with a minute patch of black scales on the outer margin.

The dorsum also has five white streaks. The first dorsal streak is the largest, extending from the basal third of the dorsum. The second white streak is trapezoidal and is less than a third of the length of the first streak. The third streak is triangular, while the fourth streak is subtriangular and the fourth streak is bordered by a halo of black streaks. The fifth dorsal streak is the smallest and is opposite and similar in size to the fifth costal streak. The fourth and fifth dorsal streaks have a light-yellow subtriangular patch between them.
