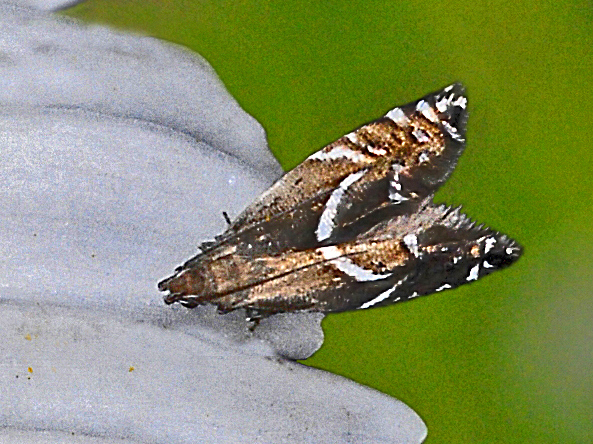
- Glyphipterix simpliciella, upperside
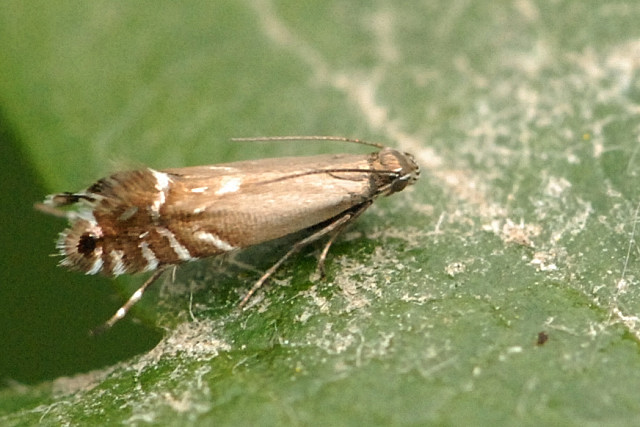
- Lateral view

Scientific classification
- Kingdom: Animalia
- Phylum: Arthropoda
- Clade: Pancrustacea
- Class: Insecta
- Order: Lepidoptera
- Family: Glyphipterigidae
- Genus: Glyphipterix
- Species: G. simpliciella

Binomial name
- Glyphipterix simpliciella (Stephens, 1834)

Synonyms
- List: Heribeia simpliciella Stephens, 1834; Heribeia cognatella Stephens,1834; Oecophora conjunctella O. G. Costa, 1834; Ornix colluripennella O. G. Costa, 1834; Elachista aechmiella Duponcel, 1838; Aechmia fischeriella Zeller, 1839; Aechmia desiderella Fischer von Röslerstamm, 1851; Aechmia desideratella Duponchel, 1842; Aechmia roesllerstammella Fischer von Röslerstamm, 1843; Glyphipteryx nattani Gozmány, 1954

= Glyphipterix simpliciella =

Cocksfoot moth

Species of moth

Glyphipterix simpliciella, the cocksfoot moth, is a species of moth of the family Glyphipterigidae.

== Distribution ==
This quite common species can be found in the western part of the Palearctic realm and is common in much of Great Britain and Ireland. This species is also found in New Zealand.

== Habitat ==
These small moths mainly inhabit flower meadows, especially with buttercup and there are often many on one flower.

== Description ==
Glyphipterix simpliciella has a wingspan of 6–9 mm. and can reach a length of 3–4 mm. These tiny cryptic moths have dark brown forewings with a slightly metallic sheen. They also show a black apical spot and five white or silvery streaks along their costa, two across the dorsum and one in the posterior corner of the wings. The hindwings are dark grey, with grey cilia. Both sexes are similar.

This species is rather similar to Glyphipterix equitella and Glyphipterix schoenicolella.

== Biology ==
It is a univoltine species. Adults are on wing from May to July. They fly in the sunshine and especially feed on nectar of buttercup (Ranunculus species), Crataegus monogyna, Euphorbia esula, and of various Apiaceae species (especially Leucanthemum vulgare).

The larvae feed on the seeds of cocksfoot (Dactylis glomerata), tall fescue (Festuca arundinacea) and Festuca pratensis. They later pupate in the stem.

== Gallery ==
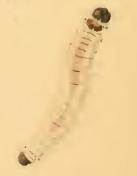
Larva

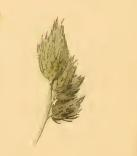
A head of Dactylis glomerata tenanted by larva

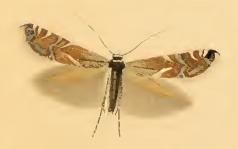
Glyphipterix simpliciella
