= Circica =

Scientific classification
- Kingdom: Animalia
- Phylum: Arthropoda
- Class: Insecta
- Order: Lepidoptera
- Family: Glyphipterigidae
- Genus: Circica; Meyrick, 1888

Genus of moths

Circica is a genus of sedge moths. It is mostly treated as a synonym of Glyphipterix, but is considered valid by some authors.

== Species ==
- Circica cionophora
- Circica xestobela
