= Neomachlotica atractias =

Scientific classification
- Kingdom: Animalia
- Phylum: Arthropoda
- Class: Insecta
- Order: Lepidoptera
- Family: Glyphipterigidae
- Genus: Neomachlotica
- Species: N. atractias

Binomial name
- Neomachlotica atractias (Meyrick, 1909)

Synonyms
- Machlotica atractias Meyrick, 1909

Species of moth

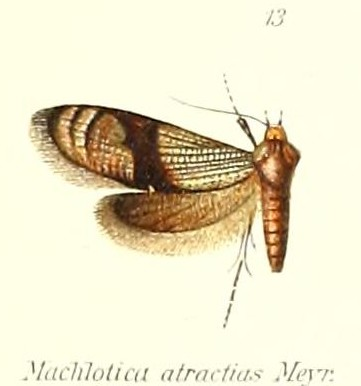
Neomachlotica atractias

Neomachlotica atractias is a species of sedge moth in the genus Neomachlotica. It was described by Edward Meyrick in 1909. It is found in Bolivia.
