= Ussara ancobathra =

Scientific classification
- Kingdom: Animalia
- Phylum: Arthropoda
- Class: Insecta
- Order: Lepidoptera
- Family: Glyphipterigidae
- Genus: Ussara
- Species: U. ancobathra

Binomial name
- Ussara ancobathra Meyrick, 1932

Species of moth

Ussara ancobathra is a species of sedge moth in the genus Ussara. It was described by Edward Meyrick in 1932. It is found in Brazil.
