= Ussara ancyristis =

Scientific classification
- Kingdom: Animalia
- Phylum: Arthropoda
- Class: Insecta
- Order: Lepidoptera
- Family: Glyphipterigidae
- Genus: Ussara
- Species: U. ancyristis

Binomial name
- Ussara ancyristis Meyrick, 1920

Species of moth

Ussara ancyristis is a species of sedge moth in the genus Ussara. It was described by Edward Meyrick in 1920. It is found in Brazil.
