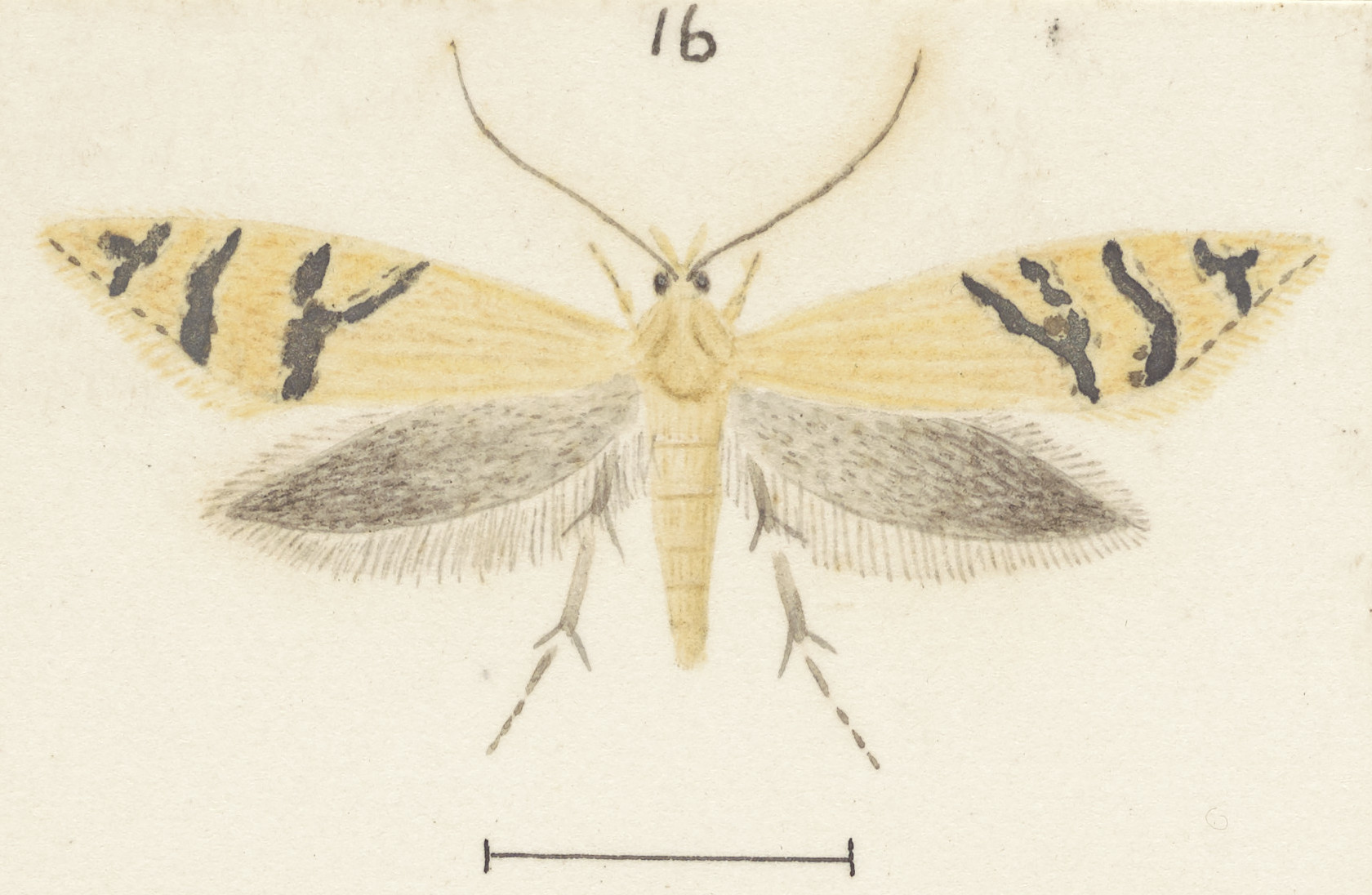
- Illustration of male

Scientific classification
- Kingdom: Animalia
- Phylum: Arthropoda
- Clade: Pancrustacea
- Class: Insecta
- Order: Lepidoptera
- Family: Glyphipterigidae
- Genus: Glyphipterix
- Species: G. aulogramma

Binomial name
- Glyphipterix aulogramma Meyrick, 1908

= Glyphipterix aulogramma =

Species of moth

Glyphipterix aulogramma is a species of sedge moths in the genus Glyphipterix. It was described by Edward Meyrick in 1908. It is found in New Zealand.
