= Cotaena mediana =

Scientific classification
- Kingdom: Animalia
- Phylum: Arthropoda
- Class: Insecta
- Order: Lepidoptera
- Family: Glyphipterigidae
- Genus: Cotaena
- Species: C. mediana

Binomial name
- Cotaena mediana Walker, 1864

Synonyms
- Myrsila auripennis Boisduval, [1875]; Encamina semifervens Meyrick, 1927

Species of moth

Cotaena mediana is a species of sedge moth, and for a long time was the only species in the genus Cotaena. It was described by Francis Walker in 1864. It is widespread throughout the Amazon, including Brazil.

It is a colourful species.
