= Diploschizia glaucophanes =

Scientific classification
- Kingdom: Animalia
- Phylum: Arthropoda
- Class: Insecta
- Order: Lepidoptera
- Family: Glyphipterigidae
- Genus: Diploschizia
- Species: D. glaucophanes

Binomial name
- Diploschizia glaucophanes (Meyrick, 1922)

Synonyms
- Glyphipteryx glaucophanes Meyrick, 1922

Species of moth

Diploschizia glaucophanes is a species of sedge moth in the genus Diploschizia. It was described by Edward Meyrick in 1922. It is found in South America.
