= Glyphipterix danilevskii =

Scientific classification
- Kingdom: Animalia
- Phylum: Arthropoda
- Clade: Pancrustacea
- Class: Insecta
- Order: Lepidoptera
- Family: Glyphipterigidae
- Genus: Glyphipterix
- Species: G. danilevskii

Binomial name
- Glyphipterix danilevskii Diakonoff, 1978

Species of moth

Glyphipterix danilevskii is a moth of the family Glyphipterigidae. It is found in Romania.
