= Ussara semmicornis =

Scientific classification
- Kingdom: Animalia
- Phylum: Arthropoda
- Class: Insecta
- Order: Lepidoptera
- Family: Glyphipterigidae
- Genus: Ussara
- Species: U. semmicornis

Binomial name
- Ussara semmicornis Meyrick, 1932

Species of moth

Ussara semmicornis is a species of sedge moth in the genus Ussara. It was described by Edward Meyrick in 1932. It is found in Ethiopia.
