= Diploschizia kimballi =

Scientific classification
- Kingdom: Animalia
- Phylum: Arthropoda
- Clade: Pancrustacea
- Class: Insecta
- Order: Lepidoptera
- Family: Glyphipterigidae
- Genus: Diploschizia
- Species: D. kimballi

Binomial name
- Diploschizia kimballi Heppner, 1981

Species of moth

Diploschizia kimballi is a species of sedge moth in the genus Diploschizia. It was described by John B. Heppner in 1981. It is found in the US state of Florida.
