= Ussara chrysangela =

Scientific classification
- Kingdom: Animalia
- Phylum: Arthropoda
- Class: Insecta
- Order: Lepidoptera
- Family: Glyphipterigidae
- Genus: Ussara
- Species: U. chrysangela

Binomial name
- Ussara chrysangela Meyrick, 1922

Species of moth

Ussara chrysangela is a species of sedge moth in the genus Ussara. It was described by Edward Meyrick in 1922. It is found in Peru.
