= Glyphipterix erebanassa =

Scientific classification
- Kingdom: Animalia
- Phylum: Arthropoda
- Clade: Pancrustacea
- Class: Insecta
- Order: Lepidoptera
- Family: Glyphipterigidae
- Genus: Glyphipterix
- Species: G. erebanassa

Binomial name
- Glyphipterix erebanassa Meyrick, 1934

Species of moth

Glyphipterix erebanassa is a species of sedge moth in the genus Glyphipterix. It was described by Edward Meyrick in 1934. It is found in China, particularly Guangdong.
