= Carmentina taiwanensis =

Scientific classification
- Kingdom: Animalia
- Phylum: Arthropoda
- Clade: Pancrustacea
- Class: Insecta
- Order: Lepidoptera
- Family: Glyphipterigidae
- Genus: Carmentina
- Species: C. taiwanensis

Binomial name
- Carmentina taiwanensis Arita & Heppner, 1992

Species of moth

Carmentina taiwanensis is a species of sedge moths in the genus Carmentina. It was described by Yutaka Arita and John B. Heppner in 1992. It is found in Taiwan.
