= Cotaena plenella =

Scientific classification
- Domain: Eukaryota
- Kingdom: Animalia
- Phylum: Arthropoda
- Class: Insecta
- Order: Lepidoptera
- Family: Glyphipterigidae
- Genus: Cotaena
- Species: C. plenella

Binomial name
- Cotaena plenella (Busck, 1914)

Synonyms
- Glyphipteryx plenella Busck, 1914; Glyphipterix plenella Busck, 1914

Species of moth

Cotaena plenella is a species of sedge moth in the genus Cotaena. It was described by August Busck in 1914. It is found in Panama and Costa Rica.
