= Carmentina chrysosema =

Scientific classification
- Kingdom: Animalia
- Phylum: Arthropoda
- Class: Insecta
- Order: Lepidoptera
- Family: Glyphipterigidae
- Genus: Carmentina
- Species: C. chrysosema

Binomial name
- Carmentina chrysosema (Meyrick, 1933)

Synonyms
- Metapodistis chrysosema Meyrick, 1933

Species of moth

Carmentina chrysosema is a species of sedge moths in the genus Carmentina. It was described by Edward Meyrick in 1933. It is found on the Solomon Islands.
