= Ussara decoratella =

Scientific classification
- Kingdom: Animalia
- Phylum: Arthropoda
- Class: Insecta
- Order: Lepidoptera
- Family: Glyphipterigidae
- Genus: Ussara
- Species: U. decoratella

Binomial name
- Ussara decoratella Walker, 1864

Species of moth

Ussara decoratella is a species of sedge moth in the genus Ussara. It was described by Francis Walker in 1864. It is found in Brazil.
