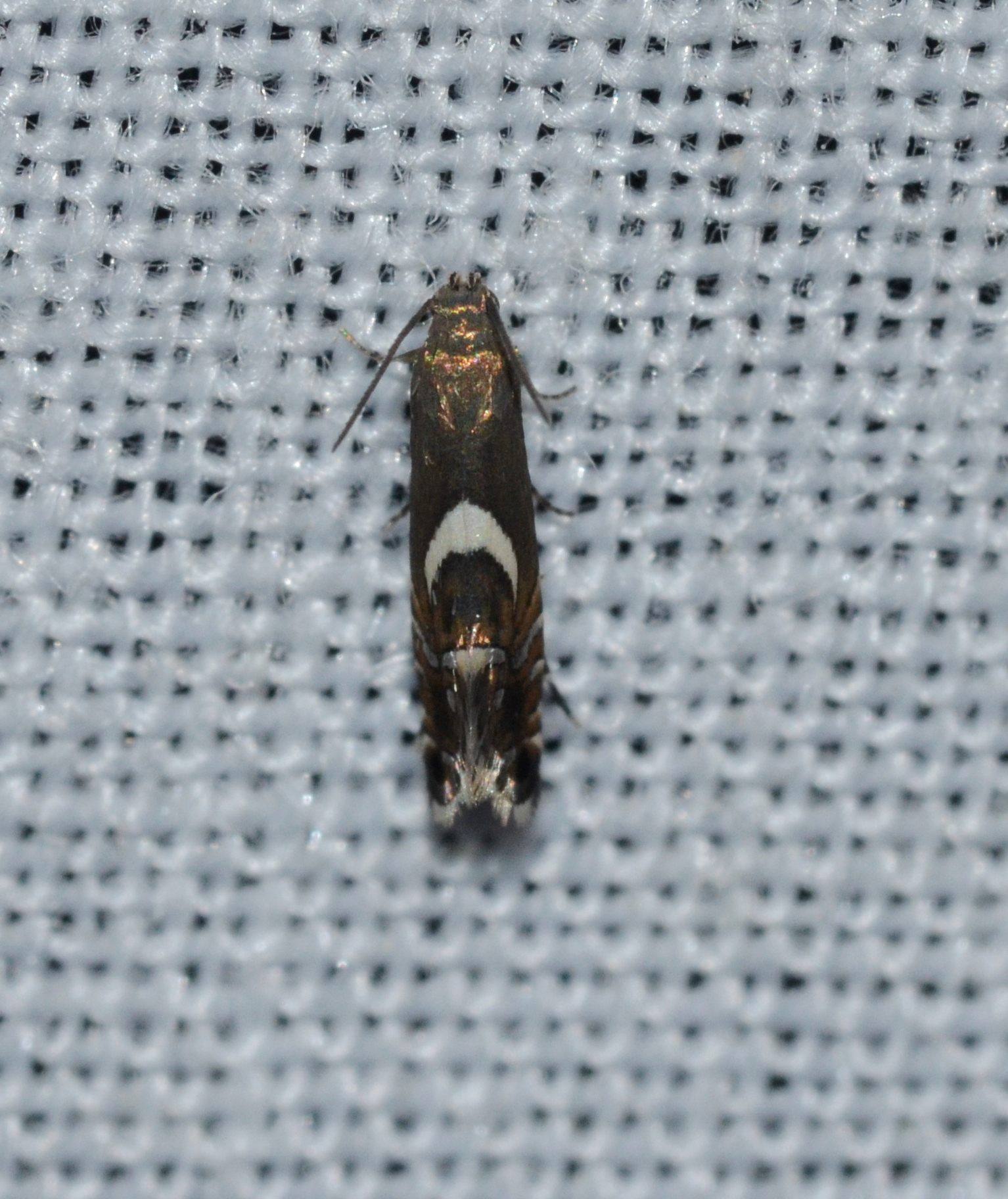

Scientific classification
- Kingdom: Animalia
- Phylum: Arthropoda
- Clade: Pancrustacea
- Class: Insecta
- Order: Lepidoptera
- Family: Glyphipterigidae
- Genus: Diploschizia
- Species: D. impigritella

Binomial name
- Diploschizia impigritella (Clemens, 1862)

Synonyms
- Glyphipteryx impigritella Clemens, 1862; Diploschizia exoptatella Chambers, 1875

= Diploschizia impigritella =

Species of moth

Diploschizia impigritella, the yellow nutsedge moth or the five-barred glyphipterid moth, is a species of sedge moth in the genus Diploschizia. It was described by James Brackenridge Clemens in 1862. It is found in North America, from Newfoundland to Florida, west to Texas and North Dakota. It has also been recorded from California.

The wingspan is 7–9 mm. Adults are on wing from early May to early November.

The larvae feed on Cyperus esculentus. They bore in the stems and leaf sheaths of their host plant.
