= Chrysocentris costella =

Scientific classification
- Kingdom: Animalia
- Phylum: Arthropoda
- Class: Insecta
- Order: Lepidoptera
- Family: Glyphipterigidae
- Genus: Chrysocentris
- Species: C. costella

Binomial name
- Chrysocentris costella Viette, 1957

Species of moth

Chrysocentris costella is a moth in the family Glyphipterigidae. It is known from Réunion island in the Indian Ocean.
