= Ussara arquata =

Scientific classification
- Kingdom: Animalia
- Phylum: Arthropoda
- Class: Insecta
- Order: Lepidoptera
- Family: Glyphipterigidae
- Genus: Ussara
- Species: U. arquata

Binomial name
- Ussara arquata Meyrick, 1926

Species of moth

Ussara arquata is a species of sedge moth in the genus Ussara. It was described by Edward Meyrick in 1926. It is found in Colombia.
