= Ussara iochrysa =

Scientific classification
- Kingdom: Animalia
- Phylum: Arthropoda
- Class: Insecta
- Order: Lepidoptera
- Family: Glyphipterigidae
- Genus: Ussara
- Species: U. iochrysa

Binomial name
- Ussara iochrysa Meyrick, 1921

Species of moth

Ussara iochrysa is a species of sedge moth in the genus Ussara. It was described by Edward Meyrick in 1921. It is found on Java.
