= Cronicombra essedaria =

Scientific classification
- Kingdom: Animalia
- Phylum: Arthropoda
- Class: Insecta
- Order: Lepidoptera
- Family: Glyphipterigidae
- Genus: Cronicombra
- Species: C. essedaria

Binomial name
- Cronicombra essedaria Meyrick, 1926

Species of moth

Cronicombra essedaria is a species of sedge moth in the genus Cronicombra. It was described by Edward Meyrick in 1926. It is found in Peru.
