= Cotaena phlegyropa =

Scientific classification
- Kingdom: Animalia
- Phylum: Arthropoda
- Class: Insecta
- Order: Lepidoptera
- Family: Glyphipterigidae
- Genus: Cotaena
- Species: C. phlegyropa

Binomial name
- Cotaena phlegyropa (Meyrick, 1915)

Synonyms
- Encamina phlegyropa Meyrick, 1915

Species of moth

Cotaena phlegyropa is a species of sedge moths in the genus Cotaena. It was described by Edward Meyrick in 1915. It is found in Guyana and French Guiana.
