= Diploschizia minimella =

Scientific classification
- Kingdom: Animalia
- Phylum: Arthropoda
- Clade: Pancrustacea
- Class: Insecta
- Order: Lepidoptera
- Family: Glyphipterigidae
- Genus: Diploschizia
- Species: D. minimella

Binomial name
- Diploschizia minimella Heppner, 1981

Species of moth

Diploschizia minimella is a species of sedge moth in the genus Diploschizia. It was described by John B. Heppner in 1981. It is found in the US state of Florida.

The length of the forewings is 2.2–2.9 mm (0.087–0.114 in). Adults are on wing from February to May and again from June to August.
