= Carmentina polychrysa =

Scientific classification
- Kingdom: Animalia
- Phylum: Arthropoda
- Clade: Pancrustacea
- Class: Insecta
- Order: Lepidoptera
- Family: Glyphipterigidae
- Genus: Carmentina
- Species: C. polychrysa

Binomial name
- Carmentina polychrysa (Meyrick, 1934)

Synonyms
- Metapodistis polychrysa Meyrick, 1933

Species of moth

Carmentina polychrysa is a species of sedge moths in the genus Carmentina. It was described by Edward Meyrick in 1934. It is found on Java.
