= Machlotica eurymolybda =

Scientific classification
- Kingdom: Animalia
- Phylum: Arthropoda
- Class: Insecta
- Order: Lepidoptera
- Family: Glyphipterigidae
- Genus: Machlotica
- Species: M. eurymolybda

Binomial name
- Machlotica eurymolybda Meyrick, 1927

Species of moth

Machlotica eurymolybda is a species of sedge moth in the genus Machlotica. It was described by Edward Meyrick in 1927. It is found in Peru.
