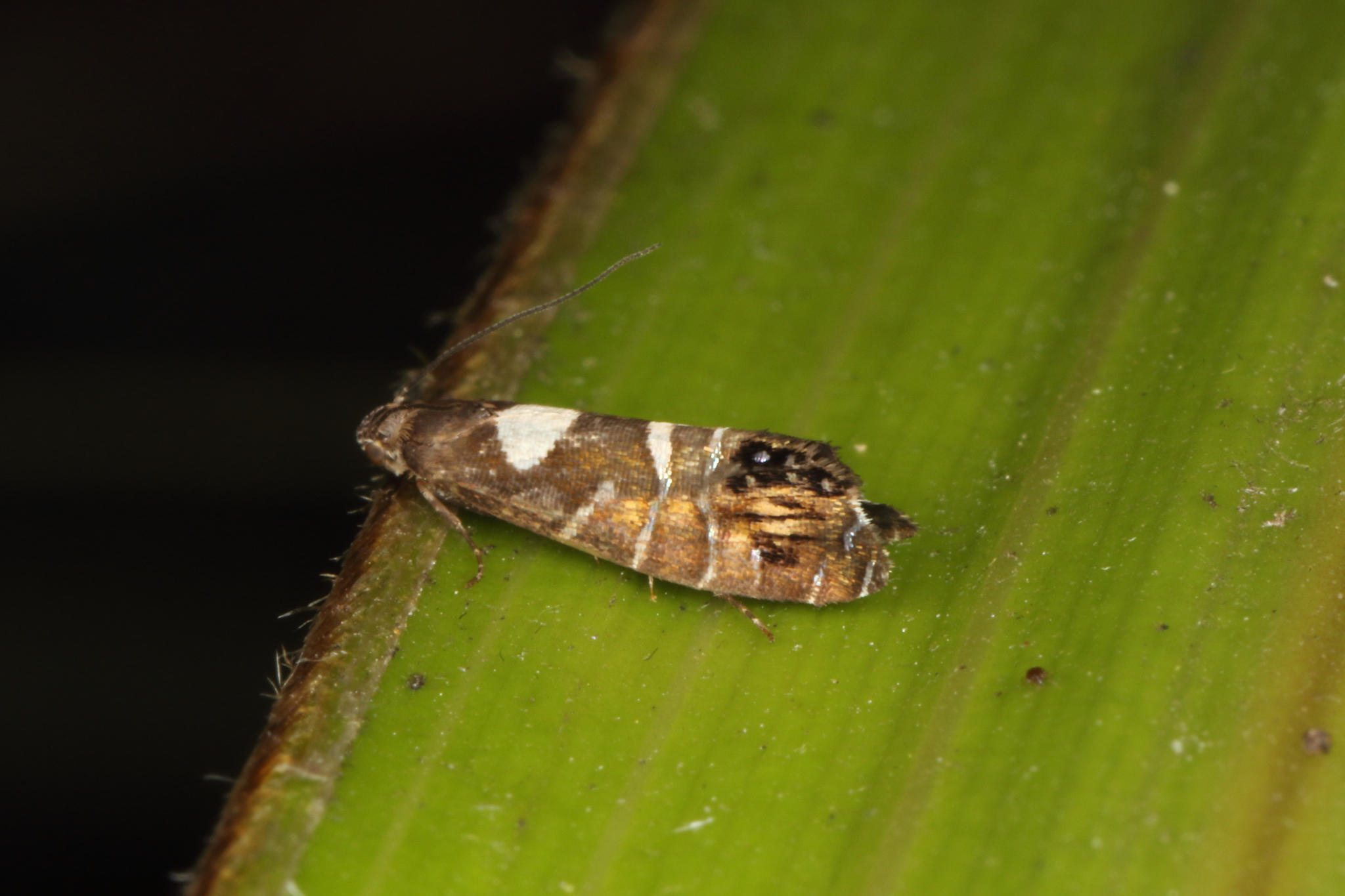

Scientific classification
- Kingdom: Animalia
- Phylum: Arthropoda
- Clade: Pancrustacea
- Class: Insecta
- Order: Lepidoptera
- Family: Glyphipterigidae
- Genus: Glyphipterix
- Species: G. similis

Binomial name
- Glyphipterix similis Philpott, 1928

= Glyphipterix similis =

Species of moth

Glyphipterix similis is a species of sedge moth in the genus Glyphipterix. It was described by Alfred Philpott in 1928. It is found in New Zealand.
