= Ussara polyastra =

Scientific classification
- Kingdom: Animalia
- Phylum: Arthropoda
- Clade: Pancrustacea
- Class: Insecta
- Order: Lepidoptera
- Family: Glyphipterigidae
- Genus: Ussara
- Species: U. polyastra

Binomial name
- Ussara polyastra Meyrick, 1937

Species of moth

Ussara polyastra is a moth in the family Glyphipterigidae. It is known from South Africa.
