= Machlotica chrysodeta =

Scientific classification
- Kingdom: Animalia
- Phylum: Arthropoda
- Class: Insecta
- Order: Lepidoptera
- Family: Glyphipterigidae
- Genus: Machlotica
- Species: M. chrysodeta

Binomial name
- Machlotica chrysodeta Meyrick, 1909

Species of moth

Machlotica chrysodeta is a species of sedge moth in the genus Machlotica. It was described by Edward Meyrick in 1909, and is the type species of the genus. It is found in Bolivia.
