= Diploschizia habecki =

Scientific classification
- Kingdom: Animalia
- Phylum: Arthropoda
- Clade: Pancrustacea
- Class: Insecta
- Order: Lepidoptera
- Family: Glyphipterigidae
- Genus: Diploschizia
- Species: D. habecki

Binomial name
- Diploschizia habecki Heppner, 1981

Synonyms
- Glyphipterix habecki

Species of moth

Diploschizia habecki is a species of sedge moth in the genus Diploschizia. It was described by John B. Heppner in 1981. It is found from southern Georgia to central Florida.

The length of the forewings is 2.4-3.4 mm. Adults are on wing from April to May and again from July to December.

The larvae feed on Rhynchospora corniculata.
