= Chrysocentris chrysozona =

Scientific classification
- Kingdom: Animalia
- Phylum: Arthropoda
- Class: Insecta
- Order: Lepidoptera
- Family: Glyphipterigidae
- Genus: Chrysocentris
- Species: C. chrysozona

Binomial name
- Chrysocentris chrysozona (Meyrick, 1921)

Synonyms
- Glyphipteryx chrysozona Meyrick, 1921

Species of moth

Chrysocentris chrysozona is a moth in the family Glyphipterigidae. It is from South Africa.

The wingspan is about 18 mm. The forewings are pale brownish-ochreous, the basal two-fifths suffused with grey and with a median transverse golden-metallic line, as well as four small indistinct pale ochreous spots on the posterior part of the costa, margined with rather dark grey anteriorly, the first three tipped with golden-metallic dots, the fourth giving rise to a golden-metallic subterminal streak reaching half across the wing. There is a triangular greyish blotch in the disc posteriorly, the apex anterior, crossed by several whitish longitudinal lines on the veins, and edged above by three small golden-metallic spots, of which the third is confluent with the third subcostal dot, and beneath by a black band marked with a row of four raised golden-metallic spots and also with whitish lines on vein 3 between these spots and vein 2 beneath them. A golden-metallic marginal streak is found around the apex and termen to this band. The hindwings are rather dark grey.
