= Carmentina molybdotoma =

Scientific classification
- Kingdom: Animalia
- Phylum: Arthropoda
- Clade: Pancrustacea
- Class: Insecta
- Order: Lepidoptera
- Family: Glyphipterigidae
- Genus: Carmentina
- Species: C. molybdotoma

Binomial name
- Carmentina molybdotoma Diakonoff & Arita, 1979

Species of moth

Carmentina molybdotoma is a species of sedge moths in the genus Carmentina. It was described by Alexey Diakonoff and Yutaka Arita in 1979. It is found in Japan.
