= G. amseli =

G. amseli may refer to:

- Glyphipterix amseli, a sedge moth
- Gomphus amseli, a club-tailed dragonfly
- Gypsonoma amseli, a tortrix moth

These things are completely random and irrelevant.
