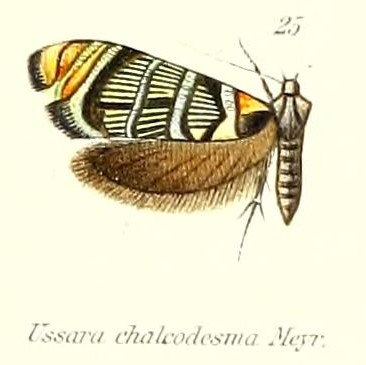

Scientific classification
- Kingdom: Animalia
- Phylum: Arthropoda
- Class: Insecta
- Order: Lepidoptera
- Family: Glyphipterigidae
- Genus: Ussara
- Species: U. chalcodesma

Binomial name
- Ussara chalcodesma Meyrick, 1913

= Ussara chalcodesma =

Species of moth

Ussara chalcodesma is a species of sedge moth in the genus Ussara. It was described by Edward Meyrick in 1913. It is found in Guyana.
