= Neomachlotica spiraea =

Scientific classification
- Kingdom: Animalia
- Phylum: Arthropoda
- Clade: Pancrustacea
- Class: Insecta
- Order: Lepidoptera
- Family: Glyphipterigidae
- Genus: Neomachlotica
- Species: N. spiraea

Binomial name
- Neomachlotica spiraea Heppner, 1981

Species of moth

Neomachlotica spiraea is a species of sedge moth in the genus Neomachlotica. It was described by John B. Heppner in 1981. It is found in the US state of Florida.

The length of the forewings is 3.2–4 mm. Adults are on wing from January to March and in May.
