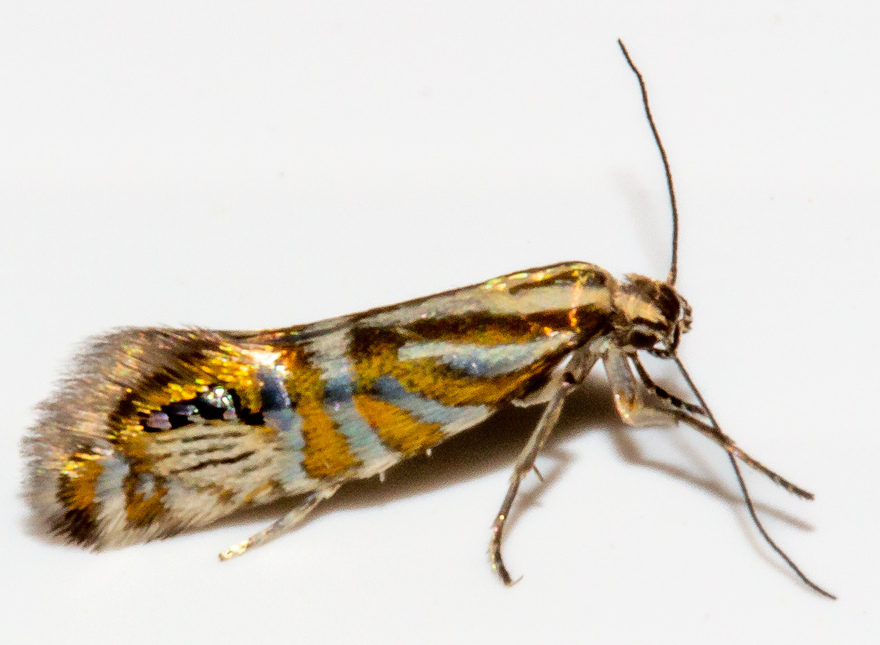

Scientific classification
- Kingdom: Animalia
- Phylum: Arthropoda
- Clade: Pancrustacea
- Class: Insecta
- Order: Lepidoptera
- Family: Glyphipterigidae
- Genus: Glyphipterix
- Species: G. triselena

Binomial name
- Glyphipterix triselena Meyrick, 1880

= Glyphipterix triselena =

Species of moth endemic to New Zealand

Glyphipterix triselena is a species of sedge moth in the genus Glyphipterix. It was first described by Edward Meyrick in 1880. It is endemic to New Zealand and has been observed in the Canterbury, Otago and Southland regions. This species frequents open grassy habitat. Adults have been observed on the wing from November until April and are rarely attracted to light. G. triselena can be distinguished from moths with a similar appearance as it has narrower forewings, a light ground colour and distinctive markings in the base of its forewings.

== Taxonomy ==
This species was first described by Edward Meyrick in 1880 using specimens collected from the Port Hills in Christchurch. Meyrick redescribed the species in more detail in 1882 as he regarded his original description as defective. In 1927 Alfred Philpott examined the male genitalia of this species. George Hudson discussed and illustrated this species in his 1928 book The butterflies and moths of New Zealand. The female lectotype, a member of the original series collected by Meyrick, is held at the Natural History Museum, London.

== Description ==
Illustration by Hudson.

Live moth.

In 1882 Meyrick described this species as follows:

♂♀. 4 1/2"-5". Head and thorax greyish-bronze, with an ochreous-whitish longitudinal line on each side of back from behind eyes through thorax, shoulders golden-ochreous. Palpi black, with four whorls of black white-tipped scales. Antennae dark fuscous. Abdomen elongate, grey, with white apical rings on segments, apex white. Anterior and middle tibiae and tarsi dark fuscous with whitish rings, posterior tibiae and tarsi light grey with whitish bands. Forewings elongate, narrowed posteriorly, hindmargin very oblique, slightly sinuate ; light golden-ochreous ; an ochreous-whitish streak along inner margin from base nearly to middle, broadly and suffusedly margined above with dark grey ; a curved leaden-metallic streak from base nearly to middle, broadly and suffusedly margined above with dark grey ; a curved leaden-metallic streak from base beneath costa to near inner margin at one-third from base ; a slightly curved oblique leaden-metallic streak from costa at one-fourth, reaching half across wing, terminating above apex of basel streak ; two straight parallel direct leaden-metallic transverse fasciae, one before, the other slightly beyond middle ; from second below middle proceeds a rather narrow longitudinal black band, bent downwards to anal angle, thence continued along lower half of hindmargin, containing two golden-metallic spots in the bend and two others on the hindmargin ; the space above this nearly to costa is filled by six whitish longitudinal lines, partially confluent or separated by narrow black interspaces ; two indistinct leaden-metallic spots on costa, merged beneath in the whitish lines ; a transverse leaden-metallic subapical spot : cilia whitish-grey, basal third within a blackish lino scaled with light golden-ochreous, with a whitish indentation beneath apex, costal cilia grey with whitish spots on costal streaks. Hindwings slaty-grey, cilia rather lighter grey.

Meyrick regarded the markings at the base of the forewings as being peculiar and highly characteristic for this species. This moth can be distinguished from its near relatives as it has narrower forewings, a light ground colour, and longitudinal basal markings which are especially noticeable when the wings are closed.

== Distribution ==
This species is endemic to New Zealand. It has been observed in the Canterbury, Otago and Southland regions. Hudson regarded this species as local.

== Habitat and hosts ==
G. triselena inhabits dry, open, grassy places. This includes coastal grass habitat.

== Behaviour ==
They are day flying moths. Adults have been observed on the wing from November until April. Adults are rarely attracted to light.

== Human interactions ==
This species is regarded as not being of economic importance.
