= Tchalla =

Tchalla may refer to:

== Fictional characters ==
- Black Panther (character)
  - T'Challa (Marvel Cinematic Universe)

== People ==
- Akotia Tchalla, a retired Togolese athlete
- Vincent Tchalla, a Nigerian–Togolese footballer

== Species ==
- Cotaena tchalla, a species of sedge moth
