= Ussara eurythmiella =

Scientific classification
- Domain: Eukaryota
- Kingdom: Animalia
- Phylum: Arthropoda
- Class: Insecta
- Order: Lepidoptera
- Family: Glyphipterigidae
- Genus: Ussara
- Species: U. eurythmiella

Binomial name
- Ussara eurythmiella Busck, 1914

Species of moth

Ussara eurythmiella is a species of sedge moth in the genus Ussara. It was described by August Busck in 1914. It is found in Panama.
