= Carmentina perculta =

Scientific classification
- Kingdom: Animalia
- Phylum: Arthropoda
- Clade: Pancrustacea
- Class: Insecta
- Order: Lepidoptera
- Family: Glyphipterigidae
- Genus: Carmentina
- Species: C. perculta

Binomial name
- Carmentina perculta Diakonoff, 1979

Species of moth

Carmentina perculta is a species of sedge moth in the genus Carmentina. It was described by Alexey Diakonoff in 1979. It is found in Taiwan.
