= Glyphipterix callithea =

Scientific classification
- Kingdom: Animalia
- Phylum: Arthropoda
- Clade: Pancrustacea
- Class: Insecta
- Order: Lepidoptera
- Family: Glyphipterigidae
- Genus: Glyphipterix
- Species: G. callithea

Binomial name
- Glyphipterix callithea Meyrick, 1921

Species of moth

Glyphipterix callithea is a moth in the family Glyphipterigidae. It is known from South Africa.

The wingspan is about 13 mm. The forewings are dark fuscous, the anterior half with scattered prismatic blue-green-metallic scales. The markings are prismatic violet-green-metallic, becoming more golden towards the apex of the wing. There are six oblique strigulae from the costa posteriorly, the first from somewhat before the middle, the third extended as a curved irregular line to the tornus. There is a slightly curved oblique striga in the disc nearly forming a continuation of the second costal strigula but not quite touching it, between this and the dorsum a group of transverse strigulae and small dots. A dot is found towards the termen above the middle and there is a short erect streak from the termen above the tornus, and a short slender streak along the apical part of the termen. The hindwings are dark fuscous.
