= Diploschizia tetratoma =

Scientific classification
- Kingdom: Animalia
- Phylum: Arthropoda
- Class: Insecta
- Order: Lepidoptera
- Family: Glyphipterigidae
- Genus: Diploschizia
- Species: D. tetratoma

Binomial name
- Diploschizia tetratoma Meyrick, 1913

Synonyms
- Glyphipterix tetratoma Meyrick, 1913

Species of moth

Diploschizia tetratoma is a species of sedge moth in the genus Diploschizia. It was described by Edward Meyrick in 1913. It is found in Guyana.
