= Glyphipterix argyromis =

Scientific classification
- Kingdom: Animalia
- Phylum: Arthropoda
- Clade: Pancrustacea
- Class: Insecta
- Order: Lepidoptera
- Family: Glyphipterigidae
- Genus: Glyphipterix
- Species: G. argyromis

Binomial name
- Glyphipterix argyromis Meyrick, 1907

Species of moth

Glyphipterix argyromis is a species of sedge moth in the genus Glyphipterix first described by Edward Meyrick in 1907. It is found in southern India and Sri Lanka.

== Description ==
The original description, as given by Meyrick, is written below-

♂ ♀. 6-7mm. Head and thorax shining greyish-bronze, Palpi with six whorls of black white-tipped scales. Antennae dark fuscous. Abdomen grey, beneath white. Forewings elongate, costa gently arched, apex round-pointed, termen faintly sinuate, oblique; 7 and 8 separate; shining golden-bronze; basal 2 occupied by a shining bluish-silvery-whitish patch, followed on dorsal half by some blackish suffusion; five bluish-silvery black-edged streaks from posterior, half of costa, and two from dorsum towards tornus, nearly or quite uniting with first two costal streaks, first resulting fascia angulated, second slightly curved; a bluish-silvery dot on tornus, and one on termen beneath apex; cilia grey, with blackish basal and postmedian shades, indented beneath apex, on costal streaks spotted with white. Hindwings rather dark grey; cilia grey. Ten specimens, Maskeliya, Ceylon, from February to April (Pole, de Mowbray.) The blue-whitish basal patch is a unique distinguishing character.
