= Chrysocentris =

Scientific classification
- Kingdom: Animalia
- Phylum: Arthropoda
- Class: Insecta
- Order: Lepidoptera
- Family: Glyphipterigidae
- Subfamily: Glyphipteriginae
- Genus: Chrysocentris; Meyrick, 1914

Type species
- Chrysocentris clavaria Meyrick, 1914

Species
- See text

Genus of moths

Chrysocentris is a genus of sedge moths. Species of this genus are known only from African countries, except Chrysocentris ditiorana which is widespread and occurs also in Asia and Australia.

== Species ==
- Chrysocentris chalcotypa (Bradley, 1965) (from Congo)
- Chrysocentris chrysozona (Meyrick, 1921) (South Africa)
- Chrysocentris clavaria Meyrick, 1914 (from Malawi)
- Chrysocentris costella Viette, 1957 (from Réunion)
- Chrysocentris ditiorana (Walker, 1863) (from Africa, Asia, Australia)
- Chrysocentris eupepla Meyrick, 1930 (from Madagascar)
- Chrysocentris infuscata Ghesquière, 1940 (from Congo)
- Chrysocentris phaeometalla Meyrick, 1937 (from Congo)
- Chrysocentris urania Meyrick, 1920 (from South Africa)
