= Chrysocentris chalcotypa =

Scientific classification
- Kingdom: Animalia
- Phylum: Arthropoda
- Class: Insecta
- Order: Lepidoptera
- Family: Glyphipterigidae
- Genus: Chrysocentris
- Species: C. chalcotypa

Binomial name
- Chrysocentris chalcotypa (Bradley, 1965)

Synonyms
- Glyphipterix chalcotypa Bradley, 1965

Species of moth

Chrysocentris chalcotypa is a moth in the family Glyphipterigidae. It is known from the Democratic Republic of the Congo.
