= Diploschizia regia =

Scientific classification
- Kingdom: Animalia
- Phylum: Arthropoda
- Clade: Pancrustacea
- Class: Insecta
- Order: Lepidoptera
- Family: Glyphipterigidae
- Genus: Diploschizia
- Species: D. regia

Binomial name
- Diploschizia regia Heppner, 1981

Species of moth

Diploschizia regia is a species of sedge moth in the genus Diploschizia. It was described by John B. Heppner in 1981. It is found in Florida.

The length of the forewings is 2.8 mm. Adults have been recorded in January.
