= Chrysocentris urania =

Scientific classification
- Kingdom: Animalia
- Phylum: Arthropoda
- Class: Insecta
- Order: Lepidoptera
- Family: Glyphipterigidae
- Genus: Chrysocentris
- Species: C. urania

Binomial name
- Chrysocentris urania Meyrick, 1920

Species of moth

Chrysocentris urania is a moth in the family Glyphipterigidae. It is known from South Africa.
