= Chrysocentris clavaria =

Scientific classification
- Kingdom: Animalia
- Phylum: Arthropoda
- Class: Insecta
- Order: Lepidoptera
- Family: Glyphipterigidae
- Genus: Chrysocentris
- Species: C. clavaria

Binomial name
- Chrysocentris clavaria Meyrick, 1914

Species of moth

Chrysocentris clavaria is a moth in the family Glyphipterigidae. It is known from Malawi.
