= Glyphipterix hologramma =

Scientific classification
- Kingdom: Animalia
- Phylum: Arthropoda
- Clade: Pancrustacea
- Class: Insecta
- Order: Lepidoptera
- Family: Glyphipterigidae
- Genus: Glyphipterix
- Species: G. hologramma

Binomial name
- Glyphipterix hologramma Meyrick, 1920

Species of moth

Glyphipterix hologramma is a species of sedge moth in the genus Glyphipterix. It was described by Edward Meyrick in 1920. It is found in Brazil.
