= Carmentina iridesma =

Scientific classification
- Kingdom: Animalia
- Phylum: Arthropoda
- Class: Insecta
- Order: Lepidoptera
- Family: Glyphipterigidae
- Genus: Carmentina
- Species: C. iridesma

Binomial name
- Carmentina iridesma Meyrick, 1930

Species of moth

Carmentina iridesma is a species of sedge moth in the genus Carmentina. It was described by Edward Meyrick in 1930. It is found on the Solomon Islands.
