= Neomachlotica actinota =

Scientific classification
- Domain: Eukaryota
- Kingdom: Animalia
- Phylum: Arthropoda
- Class: Insecta
- Order: Lepidoptera
- Family: Glyphipterigidae
- Genus: Neomachlotica
- Species: N. actinota

Binomial name
- Neomachlotica actinota (Walsingham, 1914)

Synonyms
- Glyphipterix actinota Walsingham, 1914

Species of moth

Neomachlotica actinota is a species of sedge moth in the genus Neomachlotica. It was described by Walsingham in 1914. It is found in Central America.
