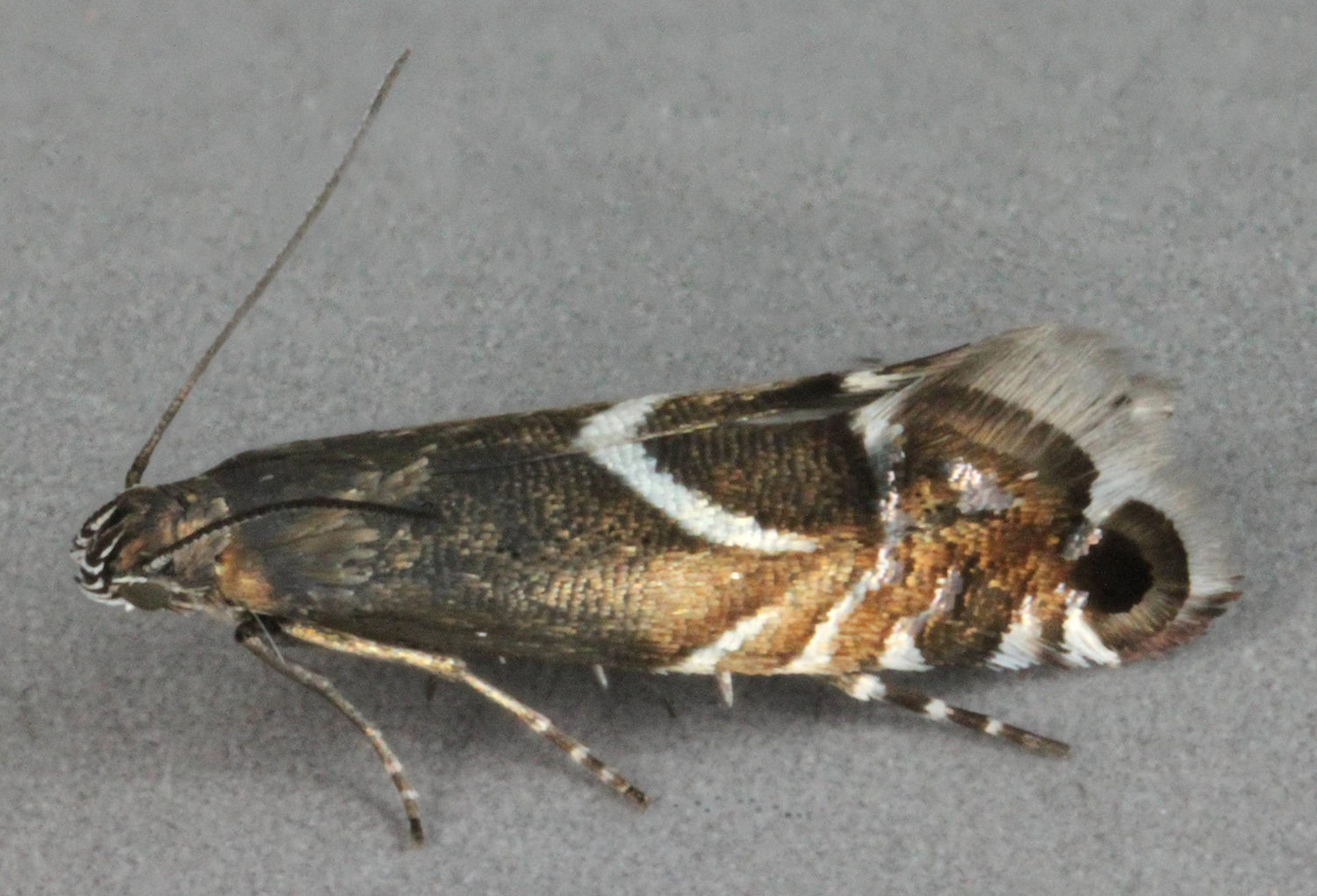

Scientific classification
- Kingdom: Animalia
- Phylum: Arthropoda
- Clade: Pancrustacea
- Class: Insecta
- Order: Lepidoptera
- Family: Glyphipterigidae
- Genus: Glyphipterix
- Species: G. schoenicolella

Binomial name
- Glyphipterix schoenicolella Boyd, 1859

= Glyphipterix schoenicolella =

Species of moth

Glyphipterix schoenicolella is a species of moth of the family Glyphipterigidae. It is found in the Netherlands, Belgium, Bulgaria, Denmark, Estonia, France, Greece, Ireland, Italy, Latvia, Norway, Austria, Portugal, Russia, Slovakia, Spain, the Czech Republic, the United Kingdom and Sweden.

The wingspan is 6–9 mm.The forewings are narrower than in G. equitella, dark bronzy -fuscous; five equally narrow white streaks from posterior half of costa; a slightly curved slender very oblique white streak from middle of dorsum, sometimes partially or wholly obsolete; an erect silvery metallic mark before tornus, meeting second costal streak; a silvery-metallic mark along tornal margin; a blackish apical spot; dark line of cilia indented below apex; a dark hook above apex. Hindwings are dark grey.The larva is whitish - green; dorsal vessel dark grey; head and plate of 2 blackish.

Adults are on wing from June to August in one generation.

The larvae feed on Schoenus nigricans. It has also been reported from Cyperus longus.
