= Ussara hilarodes =

Scientific classification
- Kingdom: Animalia
- Phylum: Arthropoda
- Class: Insecta
- Order: Lepidoptera
- Family: Glyphipterigidae
- Genus: Ussara
- Species: U. hilarodes

Binomial name
- Ussara hilarodes Meyrick, 1909

Species of moth

Ussara hilarodes is a species of sedge moth in the genus Ussara. It was described by Edward Meyrick in 1909. It is found in Assam, India.
