= Sericostola rhodanopa =

Scientific classification
- Kingdom: Animalia
- Phylum: Arthropoda
- Class: Insecta
- Order: Lepidoptera
- Family: Glyphipterigidae
- Genus: Sericostola
- Species: S. rhodanopa

Binomial name
- Sericostola rhodanopa Meyrick, 1927

Species of moth

Sericostola rhodanopa is a species of sedge moth in the genus Sericostola. It was described by Edward Meyrick in 1927. It is found in Colombia.
