= Glyphipterix orymagdis =

Scientific classification
- Kingdom: Animalia
- Phylum: Arthropoda
- Clade: Pancrustacea
- Class: Insecta
- Order: Lepidoptera
- Family: Glyphipterigidae
- Genus: Glyphipterix
- Species: G. orymagdis

Binomial name
- Glyphipterix orymagdis Meyrick, 1909

Species of moth

Glyphipterix orymagdis is a species of sedge moth in the genus Glyphipterix. It was described by Edward Meyrick in 1909. It is found in Sri Lanka.
