= Diploschizia seminolensis =

Scientific classification
- Kingdom: Animalia
- Phylum: Arthropoda
- Clade: Pancrustacea
- Class: Insecta
- Order: Lepidoptera
- Family: Glyphipterigidae
- Genus: Diploschizia
- Species: D. seminolensis

Binomial name
- Diploschizia seminolensis Heppner, 1997

Species of moth

Diploschizia seminolensis is a species of sedge moth in the genus Diploschizia. It was described by John B. Heppner in 1997. It is found in the US state of Florida.
