= Sericostola semibrunnea =

Scientific classification
- Kingdom: Animalia
- Phylum: Arthropoda
- Clade: Pancrustacea
- Class: Insecta
- Order: Lepidoptera
- Family: Glyphipterigidae
- Genus: Sericostola
- Species: S. semibrunnea

Binomial name
- Sericostola semibrunnea Heppner, 1990

Species of moth

Sericostola semibrunnea is a species of sedge moth in the genus Sericostola. It was described by John B. Heppner in 1990. It is found in Costa Rica.
