= Chrysocentris infuscata =

Scientific classification
- Kingdom: Animalia
- Phylum: Arthropoda
- Clade: Pancrustacea
- Class: Insecta
- Order: Lepidoptera
- Family: Glyphipterigidae
- Genus: Chrysocentris
- Species: C. infuscata

Binomial name
- Chrysocentris infuscata Ghesquière, 1940

Species of moth

Chrysocentris infuscata is a moth in the family Glyphipterigidae. It is known from the Democratic Republic of Congo.
