= Chrysocentris phaeometalla =

Scientific classification
- Kingdom: Animalia
- Phylum: Arthropoda
- Class: Insecta
- Order: Lepidoptera
- Family: Glyphipterigidae
- Genus: Chrysocentris
- Species: C. phaeometalla

Binomial name
- Chrysocentris phaeometalla Meyrick, 1937

Species of moth

Chrysocentris phaeometalla is a moth in the family Glyphipterigidae. It is known from the Democratic Republic of Congo.
