= Diploschizia urophora =

Scientific classification
- Domain: Eukaryota
- Kingdom: Animalia
- Phylum: Arthropoda
- Class: Insecta
- Order: Lepidoptera
- Family: Glyphipterigidae
- Genus: Diploschizia
- Species: D. urophora

Binomial name
- Diploschizia urophora (Walsingham, 1914)

Synonyms
- Glyphipteryx urophora Walsingham, 1914

Species of moth

Diploschizia urophora is a species of sedge moth in the genus Diploschizia. It was described by Walsingham in 1914. It is found in Central America.
