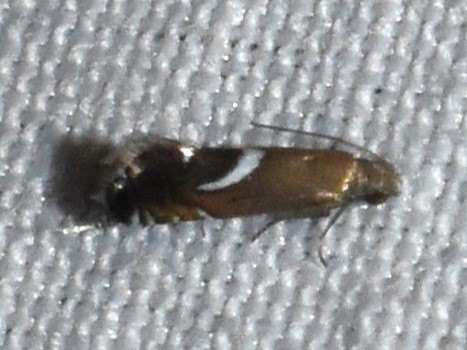

Scientific classification
- Kingdom: Animalia
- Phylum: Arthropoda
- Class: Insecta
- Order: Lepidoptera
- Family: Glyphipterigidae
- Genus: Diploschizia
- Species: D. lanista

Binomial name
- Diploschizia lanista (Meyrick, 1918)

Synonyms
- Glyphipteryx lanista Meyrick, 1918

= Diploschizia lanista =

Species of moth

Diploschizia lanista is a species of sedge moth. It was first described by Edward Meyrick in 1918. It is found in North America, including Florida, Georgia, Oklahoma, South Carolina, North Carolina, Texas and Louisiana.

The length of the forewings is 2.7–4 mm. Adults have been recorded on wing from April to May and from July to September (in North Carolina), in April (in Louisiana) and in January, May, July, September, November and December (in Florida).
