= Chrysocentris eupepla =

Scientific classification
- Kingdom: Animalia
- Phylum: Arthropoda
- Class: Insecta
- Order: Lepidoptera
- Family: Glyphipterigidae
- Genus: Chrysocentris
- Species: C. eupepla

Binomial name
- Chrysocentris eupepla Meyrick, 1930

Species of moth

Chrysocentris eupepla is a moth in the family Glyphipterigidae. It is known from Madagascar.
