= Diploschizia mexicana =

Scientific classification
- Kingdom: Animalia
- Phylum: Arthropoda
- Clade: Pancrustacea
- Class: Insecta
- Order: Lepidoptera
- Family: Glyphipterigidae
- Genus: Diploschizia
- Species: D. mexicana

Binomial name
- Diploschizia mexicana Heppner

Synonyms
- Glyphipterix mexicana Heppner

Species of moth

Diploschizia mexicana is a species of sedge moth in the genus Diploschizia. It was described by John B. Heppner. It is found in Mexico.
