= Glyphipterix sabella =

Scientific classification
- Kingdom: Animalia
- Phylum: Arthropoda
- Clade: Pancrustacea
- Class: Insecta
- Order: Lepidoptera
- Family: Glyphipterigidae
- Genus: Glyphipterix
- Species: G. sabella

Binomial name
- Glyphipterix sabella Newman, 1856

Species of moth

Glyphipterix sabella is a species of sedge moth in the genus Glyphipterix. It was described by Newman in 1856. It is found in Australia, including Victoria.
