= Toxopeia =

Scientific classification
- Kingdom: Animalia
- Phylum: Arthropoda
- Class: Insecta
- Order: Lepidoptera
- Family: Glyphipterigidae
- Genus: Toxopeia; Diakonoff, 1955
- Species: T. demodes

Binomial name
- Toxopeia demodes Diakonoff, 1955

Species of moth

Toxopeia demodes is a species of sedge moth, and the only species in the genus Toxopeia. It was described by Alexey Diakonoff in 1955. It is found in New Guinea.
