= Carmentina pyristacta =

Scientific classification
- Kingdom: Animalia
- Phylum: Arthropoda
- Clade: Pancrustacea
- Class: Insecta
- Order: Lepidoptera
- Family: Glyphipterigidae
- Genus: Carmentina
- Species: C. pyristacta

Binomial name
- Carmentina pyristacta (Turner, 1913)

Synonyms
- Glyphipteryx pyristacta Turner, 1913

Species of moth

Carmentina pyristacta is a species of sedge moths in the genus Carmentina. It was described by Turner in 1913. It is found in Australia, including Queensland.
