= Glyphipterix semiflavana =

Scientific classification
- Kingdom: Animalia
- Phylum: Arthropoda
- Clade: Pancrustacea
- Class: Insecta
- Order: Lepidoptera
- Family: Glyphipterigidae
- Genus: Glyphipterix
- Species: G. semiflavana

Binomial name
- Glyphipterix semiflavana Issiki, 1930

Species of moth

Glyphipterix semiflavana is a species of sedge moth in the genus Glyphipterix. It was described by Syuti Issiki in 1930. It is found in China and Japan.

Adults are 4–5 mm long. There is one generation per year.
