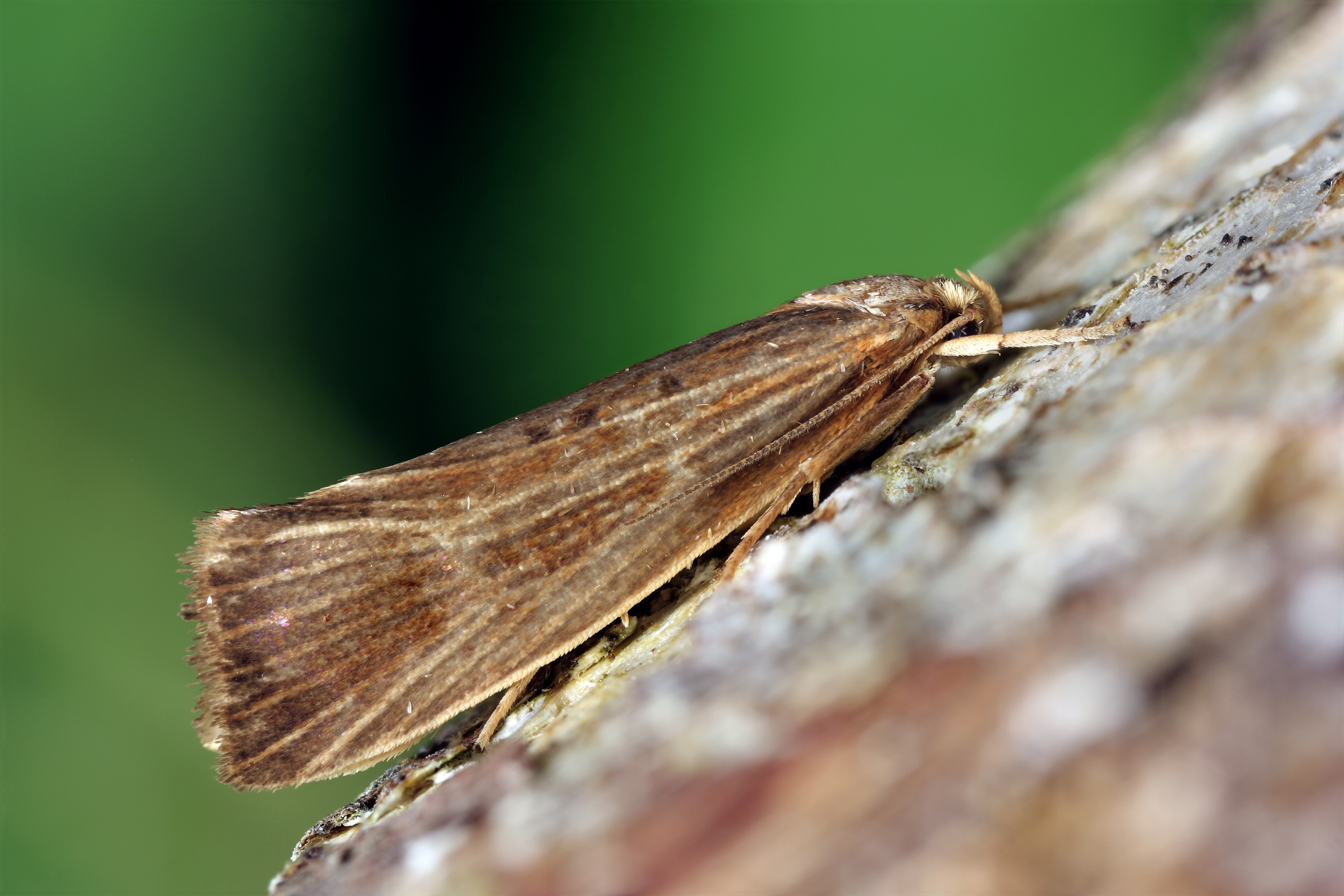

Scientific classification
- Kingdom: Animalia
- Phylum: Arthropoda
- Clade: Pancrustacea
- Class: Insecta
- Order: Lepidoptera
- Family: Glyphipterigidae
- Subfamily: Orthoteliinae
- Genus: Orthotelia; Stephens, 1829
- Species: O. sparganella

Binomial name
- Orthotelia sparganella (Thunberg, 1788)

Synonyms
- Genus: Caulobius Duponchel, 1838; Species: Tinea sparganella Thunberg, 1788; Depressaria venosa Haworth, 1811; Tinea tostella Hübner, [1824]

= Orthotelia =

Genus of moths

Orthotelia is a genus of moths in the subfamily Orthoteliinae. Orthotelia sparganella, a moth of the family Glyphipterigidae, is its only species.

Orthotelia sparganella is found in most of Europe, except Spain, most of the Balkan Peninsula and Ukraine. The wingspan is 20–28 millimetres (0.79–1.10 in). The forewings are whitish ochreous to reddish-ochreous, usually more or less suffused with dark purplish-fuscous, especially on a longitudinal discal streak dilated posteriorly, veins often marked with pale streaks; often several dark fuscous dots on fold, and a suffused dark spot in disc at 2/3. Hindwings ochreous-whitish to whitish-grey, lower half of termen suffused with grey. The larva is grey or whitish; head reddish-brown; 13 much flattened.

Adults are on wing in July and August.

The larvae can be found from May to June. They feed on Iris pseudacorus, Glyceria maxima, Scirpus lacustris, Sparganium and Typha, mining the young leaves of the host plant.

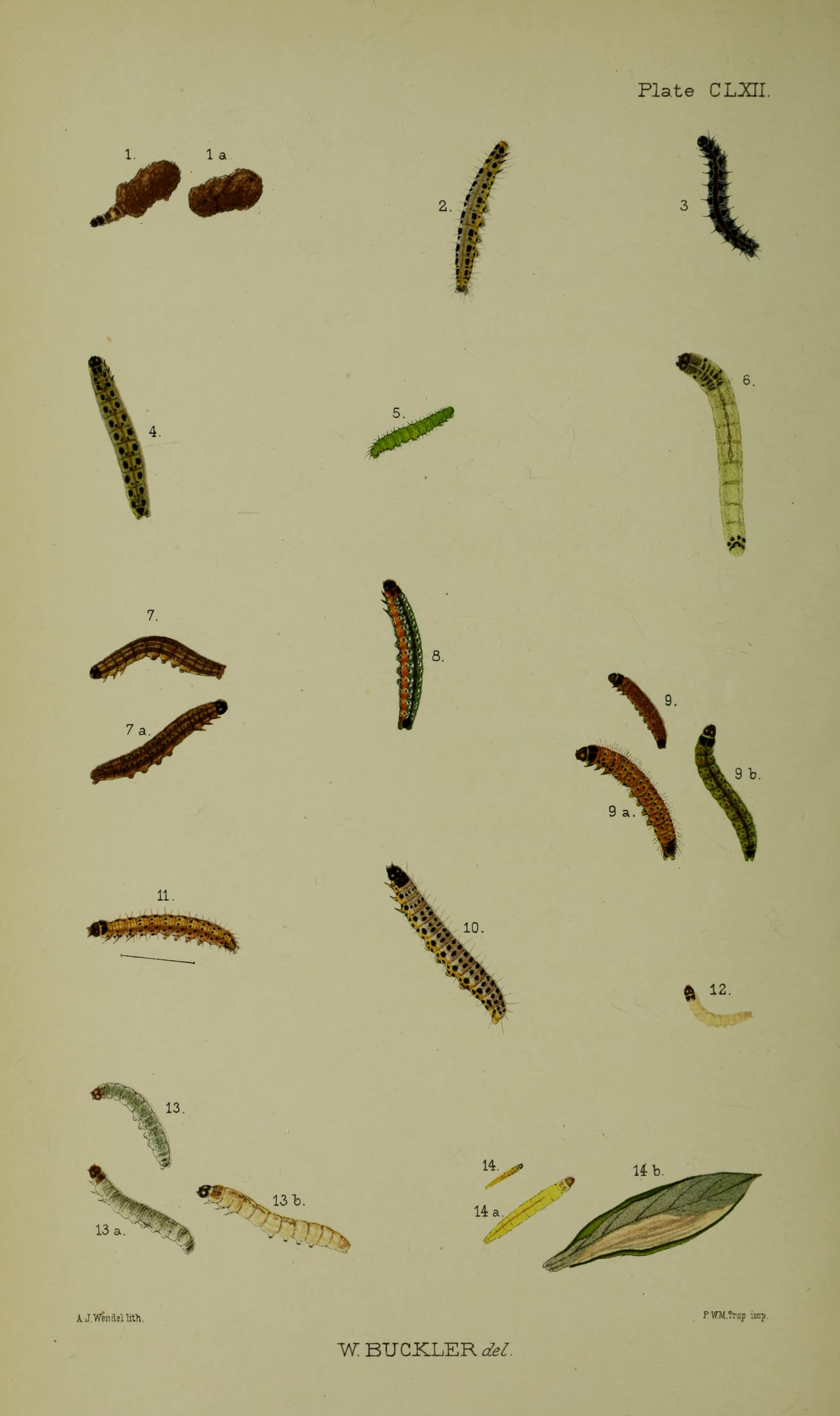
Larvae after final moult
