= Rhabdocrates =

Scientific classification
- Kingdom: Animalia
- Phylum: Arthropoda
- Class: Insecta
- Order: Lepidoptera
- Family: Glyphipterigidae
- Genus: Rhabdocrates; Meyrick, 1931
- Species: R. sporomantis

Binomial name
- Rhabdocrates sporomantis Meyrick, 1931

Species of moth

Rhabdocrates sporomantis is a species of sedge moth, and the only species in the genus Rhabdocrates. It was described by Edward Meyrick in 1931. It is found in Peru.
