= Irinympha =

Scientific classification
- Kingdom: Animalia
- Phylum: Arthropoda
- Class: Insecta
- Order: Lepidoptera
- Family: Glyphipterigidae
- Genus: Irinympha
- Species: I. aglaograpta

Binomial name
- Irinympha aglaograpta Meyrick, 1932

Species of moth

Irinympha aglaograpta is a moth in the family Glyphipterigidae. It is known from Uganda.
