= Tetracmanthes =

Scientific classification
- Kingdom: Animalia
- Phylum: Arthropoda
- Class: Insecta
- Order: Lepidoptera
- Family: Glyphipterigidae
- Genus: Tetracmanthes
- Species: T. astrocosma

Binomial name
- Tetracmanthes astrocosma Meyrick, 1925

Species of moth

Tetracmanthes astrocosma is a moth in the family Glyphipterigidae. It is known from South Africa.
