= Glyphipterix meteora =

Scientific classification
- Kingdom: Animalia
- Phylum: Arthropoda
- Clade: Pancrustacea
- Class: Insecta
- Order: Lepidoptera
- Family: Glyphipterigidae
- Genus: Glyphipterix
- Species: G. meteora

Binomial name
- Glyphipterix meteora (Meyrick, 1880)

Synonyms
- Glyphipteryx meteora Meyrick, 1880; Glyphipteryx chalceres Meyrick, 1913; Glyphipterix chalceres Turner, 1913

Species of moth

Glyphipterix meteora is a species of sedge moth in the genus Glyphipterix. It was described by Edward Meyrick in 1880. It is found in eastern Australia, including Queensland and Tasmania.
