= Electrographa =

Scientific classification
- Kingdom: Animalia
- Phylum: Arthropoda
- Class: Insecta
- Order: Lepidoptera
- Superfamily: Yponomeutoidea
- Family: Glyphipterigidae
- Genus: Electrographa Meyrick, 1912
- Species: E. thiolychna

Binomial name
- Electrographa thiolychna Meyrick, 1912

Species of moth

Electrographa thiolychna is a species of sedge moth, and the only species in the genus Electrographa. It was described by Edward Meyrick in 1912. It is found in Burma.
