= Sericostola =

Scientific classification
- Kingdom: Animalia
- Phylum: Arthropoda
- Class: Insecta
- Order: Lepidoptera
- Family: Glyphipterigidae
- Genus: Sericostola; Meyrick, 1927

Genus of moths

Sericostola is a genus of sedge moths described by Edward Meyrick in 1927.

== Taxonomy ==
The genus was included in the Plutellidae by Fletcher in 1929 but was transferred to the Glyphipterigidae by John B. Heppner in 1984.

== Species ==
- Sericostola rhodanopa
- Sericostola semibrunnea
