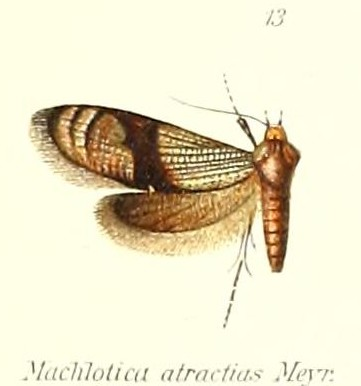
- Neomachlotica atractias

Scientific classification
- Kingdom: Animalia
- Phylum: Arthropoda
- Clade: Pancrustacea
- Class: Insecta
- Order: Lepidoptera
- Family: Glyphipterigidae
- Genus: Neomachlotica; Heppner, 1981

= Neomachlotica =

Genus of moths

Neomachlotica is a genus of sedge moths. It was described by John B. Heppner in 1981.

== Species ==
- Neomachlotica actinota
- Neomachlotica atractias Meyrick, 1909 (from Bolivia)
- Neomachlotica nebras
- Neomachlotica spiraea
