= Cotaena tchalla =

Scientific classification
- Kingdom: Animalia
- Phylum: Arthropoda
- Clade: Pancrustacea
- Class: Insecta
- Order: Lepidoptera
- Family: Glyphipterigidae
- Genus: Cotaena
- Species: C. tchalla

Binomial name
- Cotaena tchalla Sohn & Heppner, 2015

Species of moth

Cotaena tchalla is a species of sedge moth in the genus Cotaena. It was described by Jae-Cheon Sohn and John B. Heppner in 2015. It is found in Rio de Janeiro, Brazil.
