= Ernolytis =

Scientific classification
- Kingdom: Animalia
- Phylum: Arthropoda
- Class: Insecta
- Order: Lepidoptera
- Family: Glyphipterigidae
- Genus: Ernolytis; Meyrick, 1922
- Species: E. chlorospora

Binomial name
- Ernolytis chlorospora Meyrick, 1922

Species of moth

Ernolytis chlorospora is a species of sedge moth, and the only species in the genus Ernolytis. It was described by Edward Meyrick in 1922. It is found in Fiji.
