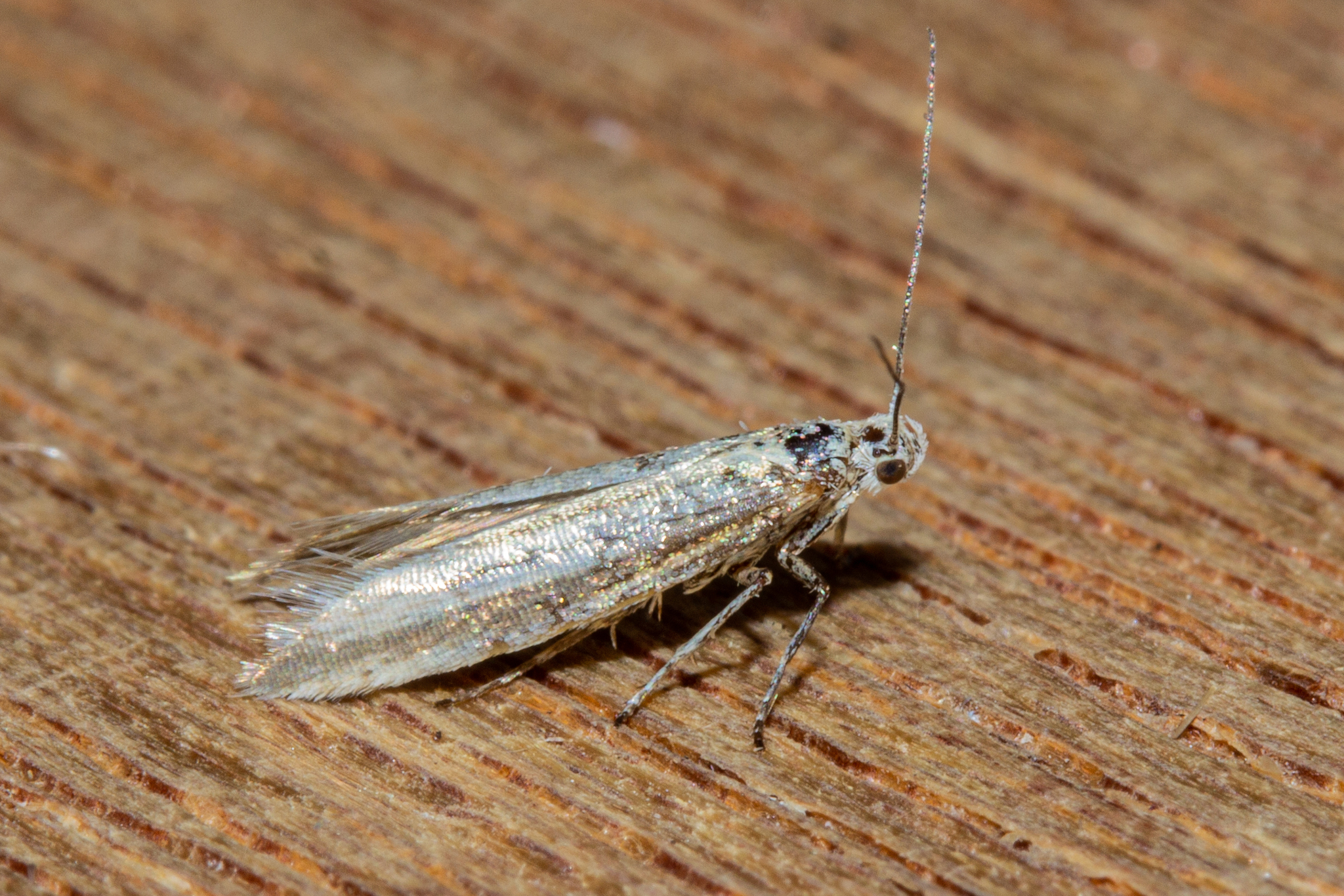

Scientific classification
- Kingdom: Animalia
- Phylum: Arthropoda
- Clade: Pancrustacea
- Class: Insecta
- Order: Lepidoptera
- Family: Glyphipterigidae
- Genus: Glyphipterix
- Species: G. cionophora

Binomial name
- Glyphipterix cionophora (Meyrick, 1888)

Synonyms
- Circica cionophora Meyrick, 1888

= Glyphipterix cionophora =

Species of moth

Glyphipterix cionophora is a species of sedge moth in the genus Glyphipterix. It was described by Edward Meyrick in 1888. It is found in New Zealand.

== Taxonony ==
This species was first described by Edward Meyrick in 1888. In 1928 George Hudson discussed and illustrated this species under that name in his book The butterflies and moths of New Zealand.
