= Drymoana =

Scientific classification
- Kingdom: Animalia
- Phylum: Arthropoda
- Clade: Pancrustacea
- Class: Insecta
- Order: Lepidoptera
- Family: Glyphipterigidae
- Genus: Drymoana; Heppner, 1985
- Species: D. blanchardi

Binomial name
- Drymoana blanchardi Heppner, 1985

Species of moth

Drymoana blanchardi is the only species of sedge moth in the genus Drymoana. It was described by John B. Heppner in 1985. It is found in southern North America including Florida, Georgia, Louisiana, Mississippi, New Jersey, South Carolina and Texas
