= Taeniostolella =

Scientific classification
- Kingdom: Animalia
- Phylum: Arthropoda
- Class: Insecta
- Order: Lepidoptera
- Family: Glyphipterigidae
- Genus: Taeniostolella; T. B. Fletcher, 1940
- Species: T. celophora

Binomial name
- Taeniostolella celophora (Meyrick, 1920)

Synonyms
- Taeniostola celophora Meyrick, 1920

Genus of moths

Taeniostolella is a monotypic moth genus in the sedge moth family (Glyphipterigidae). The genus was described by Thomas Bainbrigge Fletcher in 1940. Its only species, Taeniostolella celophora, was described by Edward Meyrick in 1920, and it is found in Brazil.
