= Cronicombra =

Scientific classification
- Kingdom: Animalia
- Phylum: Arthropoda
- Class: Insecta
- Order: Lepidoptera
- Family: Glyphipterigidae
- Genus: Cronicombra; Meyrick, 1920

Genus of moths

Cronicombra is a genus of sedge moths.

== Species ==
- Cronicombra essedaria
- Cronicombra granulata
