= Glyphipterix ditiorana =

Scientific classification
- Kingdom: Animalia
- Phylum: Arthropoda
- Clade: Pancrustacea
- Class: Insecta
- Order: Lepidoptera
- Family: Glyphipterigidae
- Genus: Glyphipterix
- Species: G. ditiorana

Binomial name
- Glyphipterix ditiorana Walker, 1863

Synonyms
- Sciaphila? ditiorana Walker, 1863

Species of moth

Glyphipterix ditiorana is a moth in the family Glyphipterigidae first described by Francis Walker in 1863. It is known from Japan, China, Thailand, India, Sri Lanka, Borneo, Java, Malaysia, Mauritius and South Africa.
