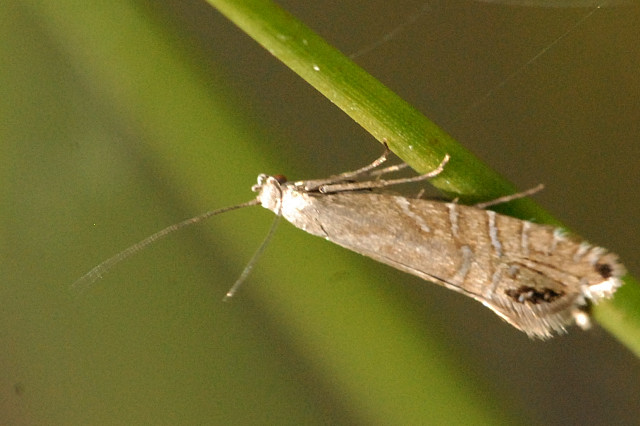

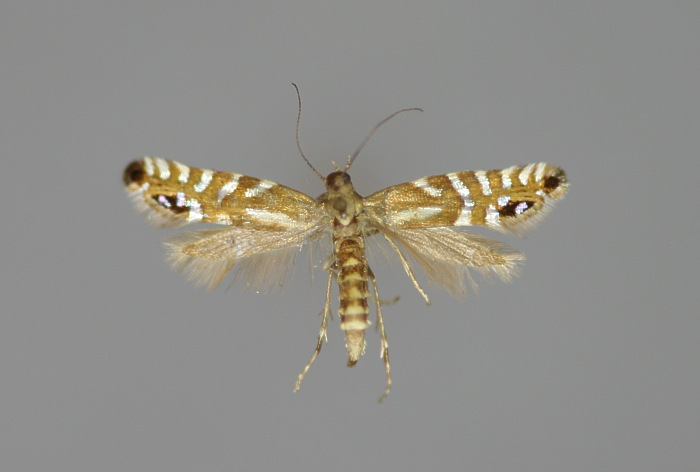

Scientific classification
- Kingdom: Animalia
- Phylum: Arthropoda
- Clade: Pancrustacea
- Class: Insecta
- Order: Lepidoptera
- Family: Glyphipterigidae
- Genus: Glyphipterix
- Species: G. thrasonella

Binomial name
- Glyphipterix thrasonella (Scopoli, 1763)

Synonyms
- Phalaena thrasonella Scopoli, 1763; Tinea klemannella Fabricius, 1781; Tinea fueslella Fabricius, 1787; Tinea fyeslella Fabricius, 1794; Tinea ahornerella Hübner, 1796; Cosmopterix ahornerella; Tinea seppella Hübner, 1796; Tinea aillyella Hübner, 1796; Phalaena triguttella Donovan, 1806; Gracillaria fueslii Haworth, 1828; Aechmia equitella Treitschke, 1933 (nec Scopoli, 1763); Aechmia poeyella Duponchel, 1838; Glyphipteryx cladiella Stainton, 1859; Glyphipteryx thrasonella var. eyndhoveniella Snellen, 1882; Glyphipteryx thrasonella var. albardella Snellen, 1882; Glyphipteryx thrasonella ab. nitens Bankes, 1907; Glyphipteryx struvei Amsel, 1938

= Glyphipterix thrasonella =

Species of moth

Glyphipterix thrasonella is a species of moth of the family Glyphipterigidae. It is found in the western part of the Palaearctic realm.

The wingspan is 11–15 mm.The forewings are shining bronzy, sometimes coppery-tinged; six obscure golden metallic transverse streaks from costa between 1/3 and apex, and one or two from dorsum posteriorly, all sometimes obsolete; a violet -black mark on tornus, enclosing two or three golden metallic dots, and a similar dot above it; sometimes two or three fine black dashes above this; a blackish apical spot; dark line of cilia indented below apex. Hindwings are dark fuscous.

Adults are on wing from May to August.

The larvae probably feed on Juncus species.
