= Cotaena =

Scientific classification
- Kingdom: Animalia
- Phylum: Arthropoda
- Class: Insecta
- Order: Lepidoptera
- Family: Glyphipterigidae
- Genus: Cotaena; Walker, 1865

Synonyms
- Myrsila Boisduval, [1875]; Encamina Meyrick, 1915

Genus of moths

Cotaena is a genus of sedge moths originally described by Francis Walker in 1865.

== Taxonomy ==
The genus was originally described in the Aegeriidae (=Sesiidae), transferred to the Heliodinidae by Edward Meyrick, to the Schreckensteiniidae by Thomas Bainbrigge Fletcher, to the Heliodinidae by Clas Michael Naumann and finally to the Glyphipterigidae by John B. Heppner and W. Donald Duckworth.

== Species ==
- Cotaena magnifica Sohn & Heppner, 2015 (from Brazil)
- Cotaena mediana Walker, 1864 (Amazon basin)
- Cotaena plenella (Busck, 1914) (from Panama)
- Cotaena phlegyropa (Meyrick, 1915) (from Guyana and French Guiana)
- Cotaena tchalla Sohn & Heppner, 2015 (from Brazil)
