= Lepidotarphius =

Scientific classification
- Kingdom: Animalia
- Phylum: Arthropoda
- Class: Insecta
- Order: Lepidoptera
- Family: Glyphipterigidae
- Genus: Lepidotarphius; Pryer, 1877
- Species: L. perornatella

Binomial name
- Lepidotarphius perornatella Walker, 1864

Synonyms
- Genus: Desmidoloma Erschoff, 1892; Species: Glyphipteryx perornatella Walker, 1864; Glyphipterix perornatella; Lepidotarphius splendens Pryer, 1877; Staintonia fulgens Erschoff, 1877

Genus of moths

Lepidotarphius is a monotypic genus of moths in the family Glyphipterigidae described by Pryer in 1877. Its single species, Lepidotarphius perornatella, was described by Francis Walker in 1864. It is found in China and the Russian Far East.

The larvae have been recorded feeding on Acorus calamus var. asiaticus.

== Subspecies ==
- Lepidotarphius perornatella perornatellus (Jiangsu, Zhejiang, northern Yunnan, Guangdong)
- Lepidotarphius perornatella fulgens (Erschoff, 1877) (Amur, Ussuri)
