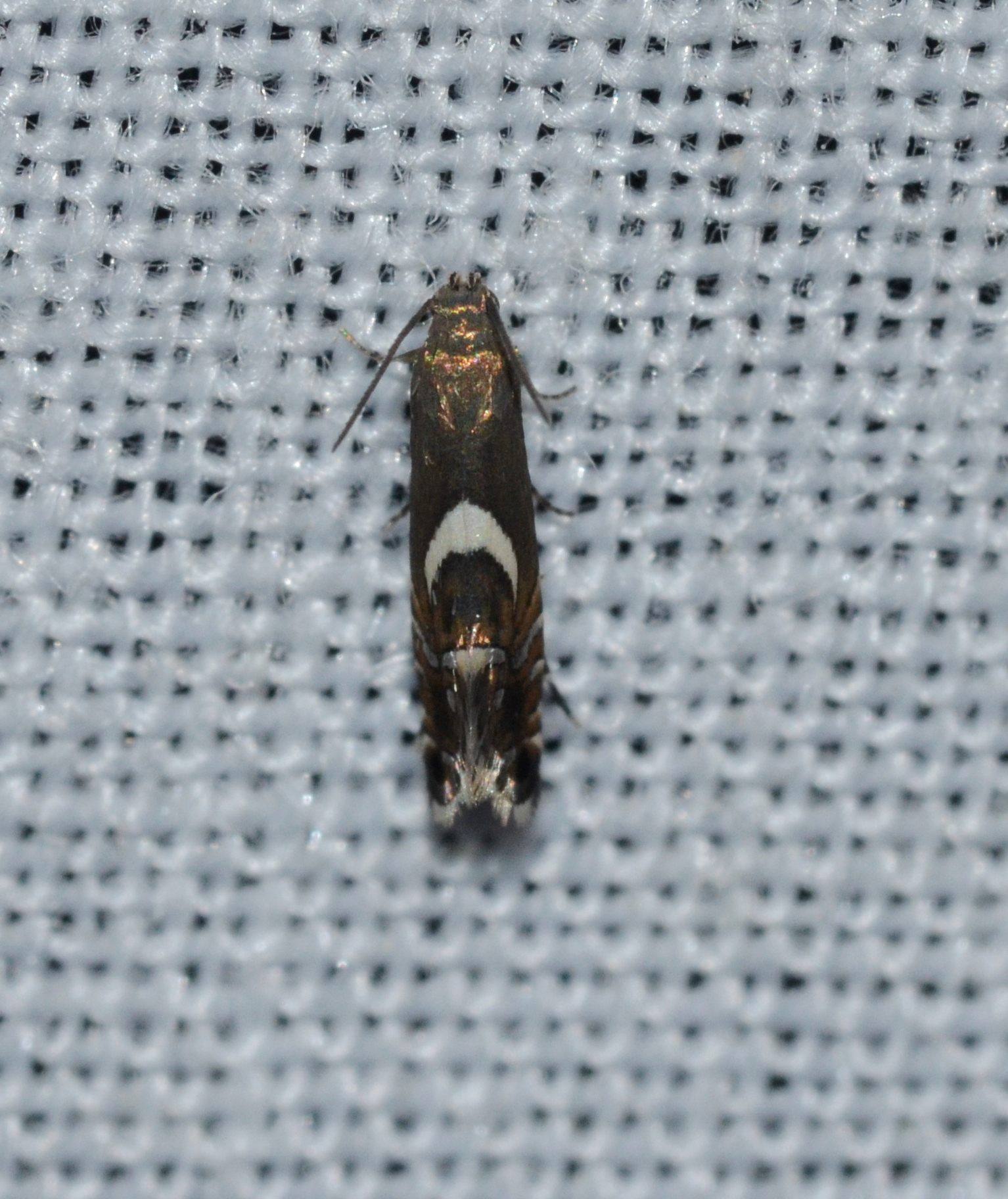
- Diploschizia impigritella

Scientific classification
- Kingdom: Animalia
- Phylum: Arthropoda
- Clade: Pancrustacea
- Class: Insecta
- Order: Lepidoptera
- Family: Glyphipterigidae
- Genus: Diploschizia; Heppner, 1981

= Diploschizia =

Genus of moths

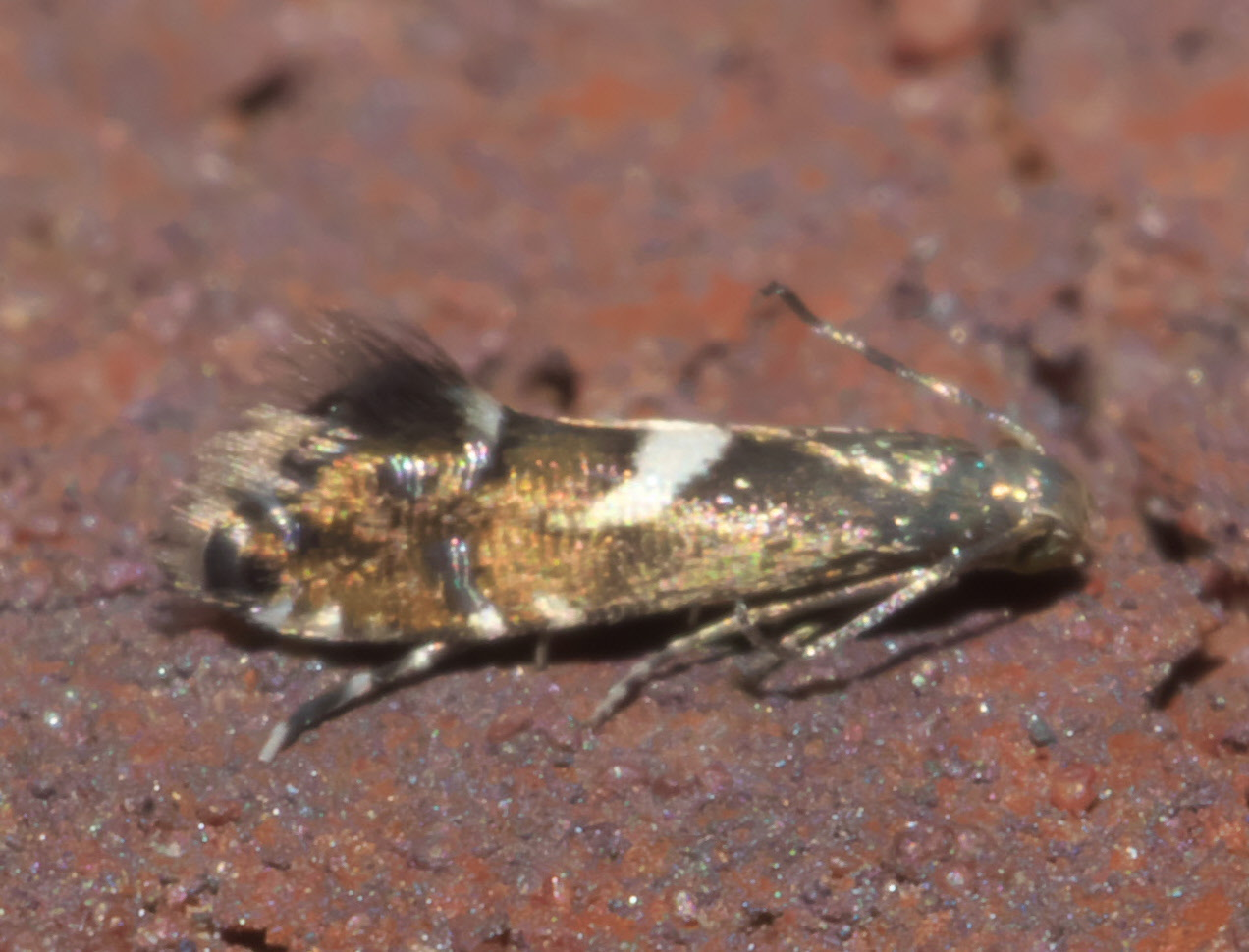
Diploschizia impigritella or lanista, 3.3 mm

Diploschizia is a genus of sedge moths. It was described by John B. Heppner in 1981. It is mostly treated as a synonym of Glyphipterix.

== Species ==
- Diploschizia glaucophanes
- Diploschizia habecki
- Diploschizia impigritella
- Diploschizia kimballi
- Diploschizia kutisi
- Diploschizia lanista
- Diploschizia mexicana
- Diploschizia minimella
- Diploschizia regia
- Diploschizia seminolensis
- Diploschizia tetratoma
- Diploschizia urophora
