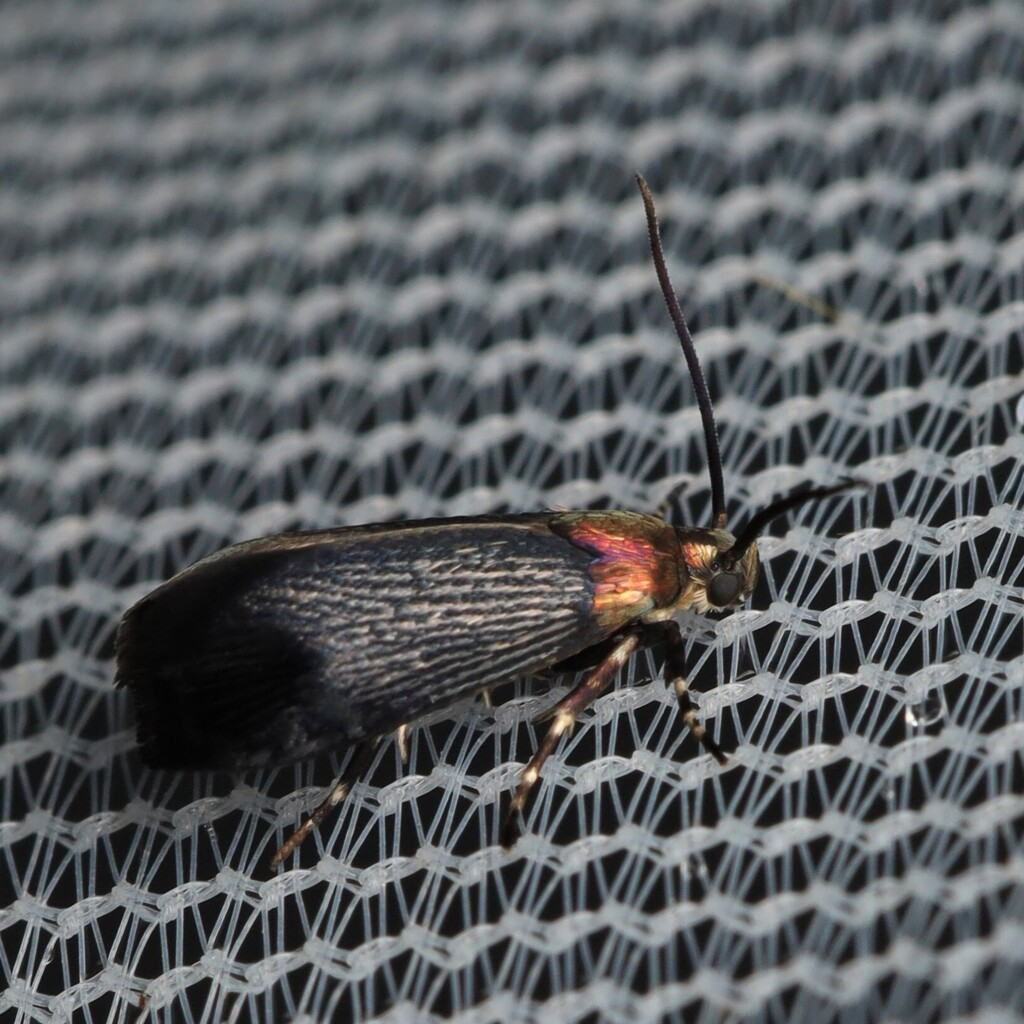

Scientific classification
- Kingdom: Animalia
- Phylum: Arthropoda
- Clade: Pancrustacea
- Class: Insecta
- Order: Lepidoptera
- Family: Glyphipterigidae
- Genus: Abrenthia; Busck, 1915
- Species: A. cuprea

Binomial name
- Abrenthia cuprea Busck, 1915

= Abrenthia =

Genus of moths

Abrenthia is a genus of moth in the family Glyphipterigidae (sedge moths). It was described by August Busck in 1915, and contains only one species, Abrenthia cuprea. This species is found in North America, including Florida, Illinois and Iowa.

The wingspan is 9–12 mm.

There is probably one generation per year. Adults have been recorded from mid-to-late June.

== See also ==
- List of butterflies of North America
- Lists of moths
