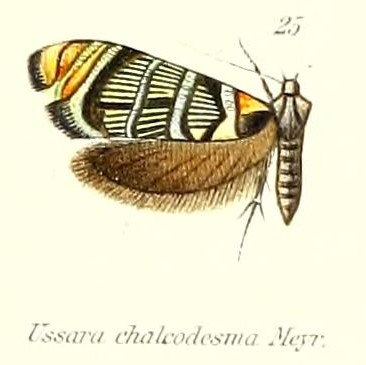
- Ussara chalcodesma, c.1913

Scientific classification
- Kingdom: Animalia
- Phylum: Arthropoda
- Class: Insecta
- Order: Lepidoptera
- Family: Glyphipterigidae
- Genus: Ussara; Walker, 1864

= Ussara =

Genus of moths

Ussara is a genus of sedge moths. It was described by Francis Walker in 1864.

== Species ==
- Ussara ancobathra Meyrick, 1932 (from Brazil)
- Ussara ancyristis Meyrick, 1920 (from Brazil)
- Ussara arquata Meyrick, 1926 (from Colombia)
- Ussara chalcodesma Meyrick, 1913 (from Br.Guiana)
- Ussara chrysangela Meyrick, 1922 (from Peru)
- Ussara decoratella Walker, 1864 (from Brazil)
- Ussara eurythmiella Busck, 1914 (from Panama)
- Ussara hilarodes Meyrick, 1909 (from India)
- Ussara iochrysa Meyrick, 1921 (from Indonesia)
- Ussara olyranta Meyrick, 1931 (from Brazil)
- Ussara phaeobathra Meyrick, 1932 (South America)
- Ussara polyastra Meyrick, 1937 (from South Africa)
- Ussara repletana Walker, 1864 (from Brazil)
- Ussara semmicornis Meyrick, 1932 (from Ethiopia)
