= Glyphipterix amblycerella =

Scientific classification
- Kingdom: Animalia
- Phylum: Arthropoda
- Clade: Pancrustacea
- Class: Insecta
- Order: Lepidoptera
- Family: Glyphipterigidae
- Genus: Glyphipterix
- Species: G. amblycerella

Binomial name
- Glyphipterix amblycerella Meyrick, 1882

Species of moth

Glyphipterix amblycerella is a species of sedge moth in the genus Glyphipterix. It was described by Edward Meyrick in 1882. It is found in Australia, including Victoria.
