= Machlotica =

Scientific classification
- Kingdom: Animalia
- Phylum: Arthropoda
- Class: Insecta
- Order: Lepidoptera
- Family: Glyphipterigidae
- Genus: Machlotica; Meyrick, 1909

Genus of moths

Machlotica is a genus of sedge moths. It was described by Edward Meyrick in 1909.

== Species ==
- Machlotica chrysodeta
- Machlotica eurymolybda
- Machlotica porphyrospila
