= Carmentina =

Scientific classification
- Kingdom: Animalia
- Phylum: Arthropoda
- Clade: Pancrustacea
- Class: Insecta
- Order: Lepidoptera
- Family: Glyphipterigidae
- Genus: Carmentina; Meyrick, 1930

Synonyms
- Metapodistis Meyrick, 1933

Genus of moths

Carmentina is a genus of sedge moths.

== Species ==
- Carmentina chrysosema
- Carmentina iridesma
- Carmentina molybdotoma
- Carmentina perculta
- Carmentina polychrysa
- Carmentina pyristacta
- Carmentina taiwanensis
