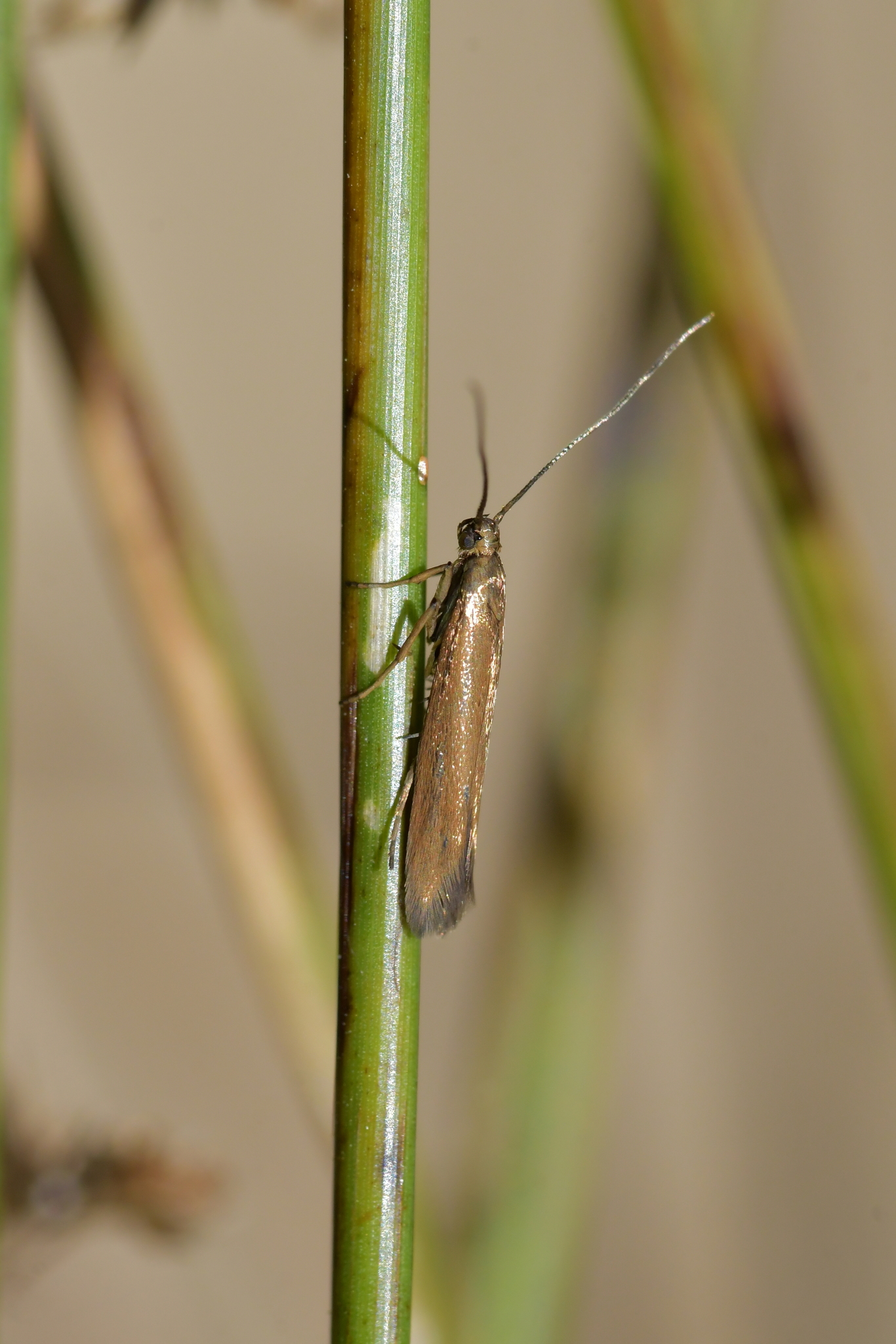

Scientific classification
- Kingdom: Animalia
- Phylum: Arthropoda
- Class: Insecta
- Order: Lepidoptera
- Family: Glyphipterigidae
- Genus: Pantosperma; Meyrick, 1888
- Species: P. holochalca

Binomial name
- Pantosperma holochalca Meyrick, 1888

= Pantosperma =

Pantosperma holochalca

Genus of moths

Pantosperma is a monotypic genus of moths belonging to the family Glyphipterigidae. It consists of only one species, Pantosperma holochalca, which is endemic to New Zealand. It was described by Edward Meyrick in 1888.

== Taxonomy ==
Edward Meyrick first described this genus and species in 1888 using specimens collected at Makatoku in the Hawke's Bay. The male lectotype is held at the Natural History Museum, London.
