= Uranophenga =

Scientific classification
- Kingdom: Animalia
- Phylum: Arthropoda
- Class: Insecta
- Order: Lepidoptera
- Family: Glyphipterigidae
- Genus: Uranophenga; Diakonoff, 1951
- Species: U. lemniscata

Binomial name
- Uranophenga lemniscata Diakonoff, 1952

Genus of moths

Uranophenga is a monotypic moth genus in the sedge moth family (Glyphipterigidae). The genus was described by Alexey Diakonoff in 1951. Its only species, Uranophenga lemniscata, was described by the same author in 1952. It is found in Myanmar.
