= Phalerarcha =

Scientific classification
- Kingdom: Animalia
- Phylum: Arthropoda
- Clade: Pancrustacea
- Class: Insecta
- Order: Lepidoptera
- Family: Glyphipterigidae
- Subfamily: Glyphipteriginae
- Genus: Phalerarcha; Meyrick, 1913
- Species: P. chrysorma

Binomial name
- Phalerarcha chrysorma Meyrick, 1913

Genus of moths

Phalerarcha chrysorma is a species of sedge moth, and the only species in the genus Phalerarcha. It was described by Edward Meyrick in 1913. It is found in Guyana.
