= Glyphipterix argyrelata =

Scientific classification
- Kingdom: Animalia
- Phylum: Arthropoda
- Clade: Pancrustacea
- Class: Insecta
- Order: Lepidoptera
- Family: Glyphipterigidae
- Genus: Glyphipterix
- Species: G. argyrelata

Binomial name
- Glyphipterix argyrelata (Turner, 1932)

Synonyms
- Glyphipteryx argyrelata Turner, 1932

Species of moth

Glyphipterix argyrelata is a species of sedge moths in the genus Glyphipterix. It was described by Alfred Jefferis Turner in 1932. It is found in Australia, including Queensland.
