= Trapeziophora =

Scientific classification
- Kingdom: Animalia
- Phylum: Arthropoda
- Class: Insecta
- Order: Lepidoptera
- Family: Glyphipterigidae
- Genus: Trapeziophora; Walsingham, 1892
- Species: T. gemmula

Binomial name
- Trapeziophora gemmula Walsingham, 1892

Species of moth

Trapeziophora gemmula is a species of sedge moth, and the only species in the genus Trapeziophora. It was described by Walsingham in 1892. It is found in the West Indies.

The wingspan is 11 mm. The forewings are greyish fuscous at the base, blending into bright purple on the apical half of the wing. The basal half is irrorated with small whitish shining dots, which run in a series of lines, radiating outwards from the base to the middle of the wing. A few similar dots, but of a rather yellower colour, are visible about the middle of the bright purple apical half of the wing. Upon this outer half are four distinct shining iridescent metallic bands, with a lilac or green reflexion. The hindwings are brown.
