= Glyphipterix autopetes =

Scientific classification
- Kingdom: Animalia
- Phylum: Arthropoda
- Clade: Pancrustacea
- Class: Insecta
- Order: Lepidoptera
- Family: Glyphipterigidae
- Genus: Glyphipterix
- Species: G. autopetes

Binomial name
- Glyphipterix autopetes Meyrick, 1907

Synonyms
- Glyphipteryx lychnophora Turner, 1913

Species of moth

Glyphipterix autopetes is a species of sedge moth in the genus Glyphipterix. It was described by Edward Meyrick in 1907. It is found in Australia, including New South Wales and Queensland.
