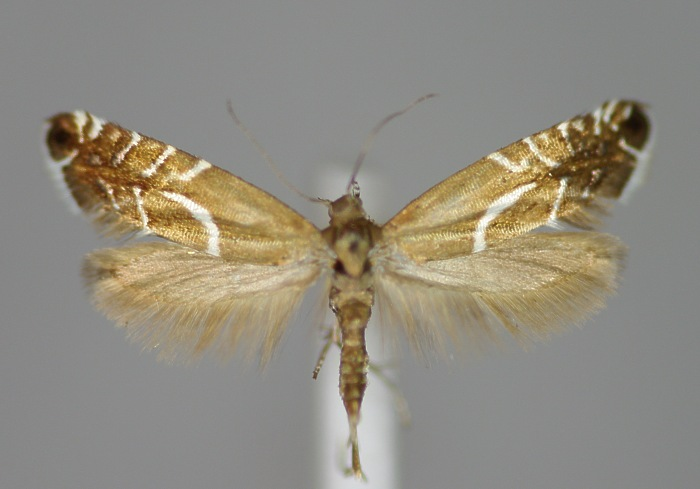

Scientific classification
- Kingdom: Animalia
- Phylum: Arthropoda
- Clade: Pancrustacea
- Class: Insecta
- Order: Lepidoptera
- Family: Glyphipterigidae
- Genus: Glyphipterix
- Species: G. equitella

Binomial name
- Glyphipterix equitella (Scopoli, 1763)

Synonyms
- Phalaena equitella Scopoli, 1763; Glyphipteryx crassilunella Rebel, 1916; Aechmia majorella von Heinemann & Wocke, [1876]; Aechmia minorella Snellen, 1882; Glyphipterix minorella; Glyphipteryx zermattensis Amsel, 1933; Glyphipteryx sexguttella Toll, 1936

= Glyphipterix equitella =

Species of moth

Glyphipterix equitella is a moth of the family Glyphipterigidae. It is found from Fennoscandia to the Iberian Peninsula, Sardinia, Sicily and Crete and from Ireland to Romania.

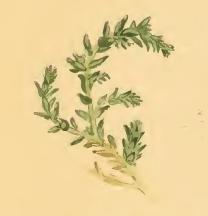
Sprig of Sedum acre with mined leaves

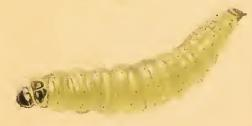
Larva

The wingspan is 9–10 mm. The forewings are dark bronzy fuscous; from five to seven white streaks from posterior half of costa, first markedly broadest and most oblique, others sometimes bright leaden -metallic in disc; a curved very oblique white streak from middle of dorsum, reaching half across wing; an erect silvery-metallic mark before tornus; a silvery-metallic mark along tornal margin; a blackish apical spot; dark line of cilia indented below apex; a dark hook above apex. Hindwings are grey.The larva is pale yellow; head and plate of 2 black

Adults are on wing from June to July in one generation per year.

The larvae feed on Sedum acre and Sedum anglicum. They mine the leaves of their host plant. Pupation takes place outside of the mine. Full-grown larvae can be found in late May. The larvae are pale yellow with a black head.

== Subspecies ==
- Glyphipterix equitella equitella
- Glyphipterix equitella crassilunella Rebel, 1916 (Canary Islands, Crete, Sardinia)
