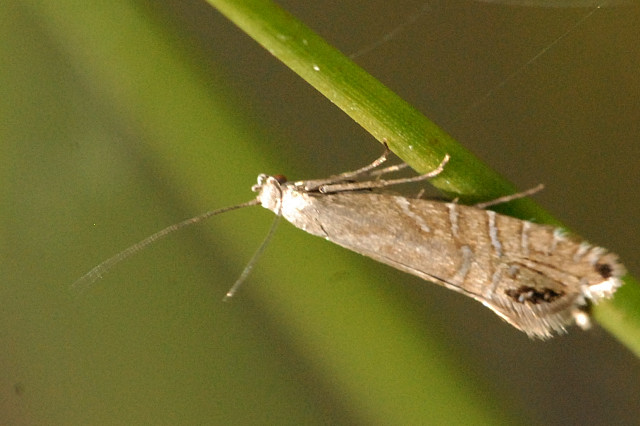
- Glyphipterix thrasonella

Scientific classification
- Kingdom: Animalia
- Phylum: Arthropoda
- Clade: Pancrustacea
- Class: Insecta
- Order: Lepidoptera
- Superfamily: Yponomeutoidea
- Family: Glyphipterigidae; Stainton, 1854

Genera
- See text.

Synonyms
- Aechmiidae Bruand, 1850

= Glyphipterigidae =

Family of moths

The Glyphipterigidae are a family of small moths commonly known as sedge moths, as the larvae of many species feed on sedges and rushes. More than 500 species have been described in the family.

== Characters ==
The moths have a wingspan of 7 to 16 millimeters. They have a slender and elongated body. The fore wings are narrow to wide and are two to four times longer than wide. They have 13 veins; with 2 anal veins (1b and 1c). The hind wings are frayed and have a similar width to the front wings. The hindwings have well-developed neuration; 7–10 veined either with no or 3 anal veins (1a,1b and 1c). There are some species that have metallic shiny wings or metallic patterns on the wings (often metallic crescent markings along the costa and inner margin of the forewings). The antennae are half as long, to the same length as the front wings. In addition to the compound eyes, the moths also have ocelli. Their maxillary palpi may be well developed or strongly regressed, the proboscis is fully developed and lacks scales.

== Genera ==
- Abrenthia
- Anacampsiodes
- Carmentina
- Chrysocentris
- Circica
- Cotaena
- Cronicombra
- Diploschizia
- Drymoana
- Electrographa
- Ernolytis
- Eusthenica
- Glyphipterix
- Irinympha
- Lepidotarphius
- Machlotica
- Neomachlotica
- Orthotelia
- Pantosperma
- Phalerarcha
- Rhabdocrates
- Sericostola
- Taeniostolella
- Tetracmanthes
- Toxopeia
- Trapeziophora
- Uranophenga
- Ussara

== Selected former genera ==
- Setiostoma
