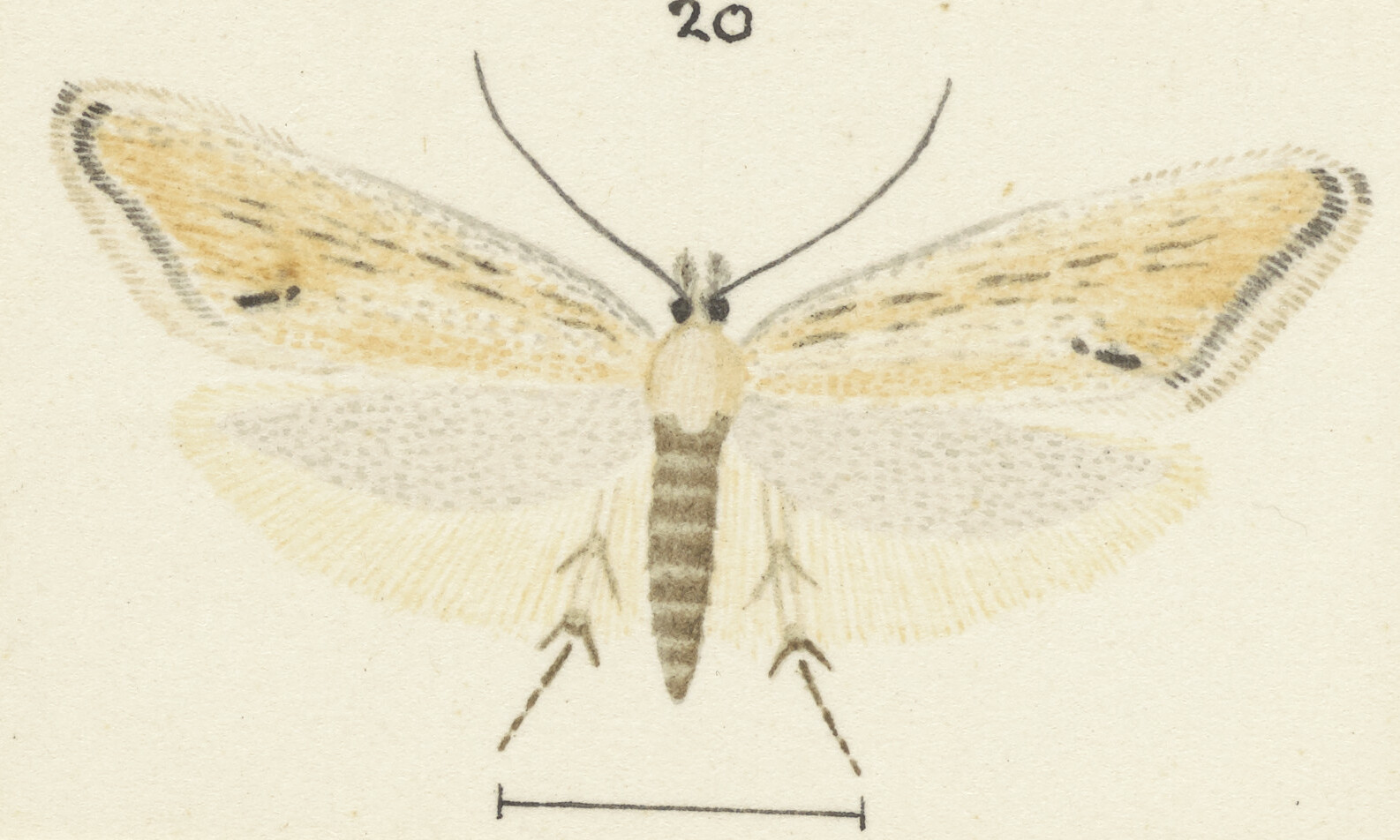
- Illustration by George Hudson, c. 1938

Conservation status
- Data Deficit (NZ TCS)

Scientific classification
- Kingdom: Animalia
- Phylum: Arthropoda
- Clade: Pancrustacea
- Class: Insecta
- Order: Lepidoptera
- Family: Glyphipterigidae
- Genus: Glyphipterix
- Species: G. necopina

Binomial name
- Glyphipterix necopina Philpott, 1927

= Glyphipterix necopina =

Species of moth endemic to New Zealand

Glyphipterix necopina is a species of sedge moth in the genus Glyphipterix. It is endemic to New Zealand and has been observed in the South Island. This species inhabits valley marshes amongst herb plants and dry localities in mountainous terrain. Adults are on the wing from November until March. In 2025 this species was classified as "data deficient" under the New Zealand Threat Classification System by the Department of Conservation.

== Taxonomy ==
This species was described by Alfred Philpott in 1927 using specimens he collected at Golden Downs and Gordon's Nob in Nelson. In 1927 Philpott also studied the male genitalia of this species. George Hudson discussed and illustrated this species in his 1939 book A supplement to the butterflies and moths of New Zealand. The male holotype specimen, collected at Golden Downs, is held at the New Zealand Arthropod Collection.

== Description ==
Philpott described this species as follows:

♂ ♀. 12–14 mm. Head ochreous-whitish. Palpi ochreouswhitish, apex of terminal segment brown. Antennae fuscous, annulated with ochreous, basally ochreous. Thorax pale ochreous. Abdomen ochreous-whitish. Legs ochreous-whitish, anterior pair infuscated. Forewings with the branches of the first cubitus shortstalked, costa moderately arched, apex pointed, termen oblique; ochreous mixed with white; a blackish–fuscous spot, usually elongate, at about 1/3; a black dot in disc at 2/3; fringes ochreous. Hindwings greyish-fuscous; fringes ochreous.

G. necopina is similar in appearance to G. achlyocessa but differs as it is smaller in size and in palpal tuft as well as having less obvious streaks in the disk markings.

== Distribution ==
This species is endemic to New Zealand. Along with the type locality, Philpott also collected specimens at Gordon's Nob near Nelson, at Seaward Moss in Invercargill in January, and at Bottle Lake and Waikuku in Canterbury in November and in March.

== Biology and behaviour ==
Adults are on the wing from November until March but is most abundant in January.

== Host species and habitat ==
This species can be found inhabiting valley marshes amongst herb plants and in dry localities in mountainous terrain.

== Conservation status ==
In 2025 this species was classified by the New Zealand Department of Conservation as "data deficient" under the New Zealand Threat Classification System as a result of the difficulty in identifying this species.
