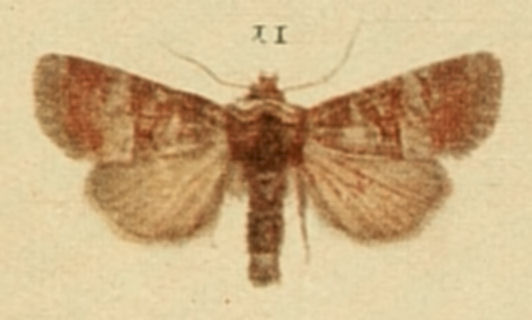

Scientific classification
- Domain: Eukaryota
- Kingdom: Animalia
- Phylum: Arthropoda
- Class: Insecta
- Order: Lepidoptera
- Superfamily: Noctuoidea
- Family: Noctuidae
- Genus: Mesoligia
- Species: M. literosa

Binomial name
- Mesoligia literosa (Haworth, 1809)

Synonyms
- Noctua literosa Haworth, 1809; Noctua erratricula Hübner, 1813; Apamea suffuruncula Treitschke, 1825; Apamea onychina Herrich-Schäffer, 1856; Miana literosa (Haworth, 1809); Litoligia literosa (Haworth, 1809); Miana erratricula var. powelli Oberthür, 1918; Miana literosa f. hispanica Heydemann, 1942; Mesoligia literosa minorasia Rezbanyai-Reser, 1998; Mesoligia literosa siciliana Rezbanyai-Reser, 1998; Hadena literosa var. subarcta Staudinger, 1897

= Mesoligia literosa =

Rosy minor

Species of moth

Mesoligia literosa, the rosy minor, is a moth of the family Noctuidae. The species was first described by Adrian Hardy Haworth in 1809. It is found throughout Europe, North Africa and western Asia. and east across the Palearctic to Siberia.

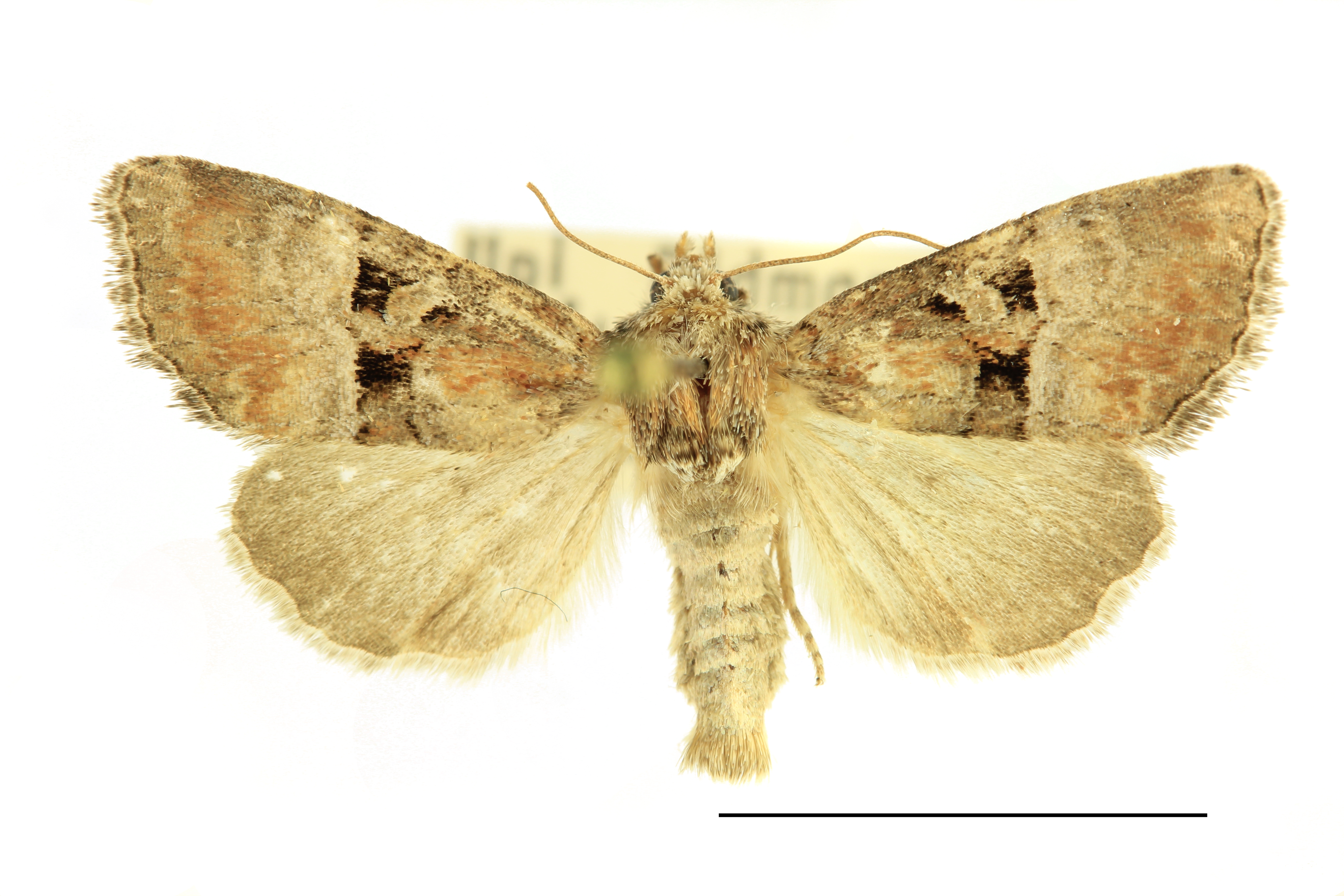

== Technical description and variation ==
The wingspan is 23–30 mm. Forewing violet grey, with a partial rosy-brown flush; the costa, cell, and median area dark fuscous, the costa often remaining pale; inner and outer lines dark, conversely edged with pale, the inner strongly outcurved below middle, closely approximated to the erect lower half of outer line; a black bar from line to line along submedian fold; claviform stigma obsolete, or minute; orbicular grey, with edge only black margined, the margin straight and forming nearly a straight line with the lower half of outer line; submarginal line pale grey, the shade before it red brown, the terminal area dark grey; hindwing greyish fuscous; in the ab. constricta ab. nov. [Warren] principally confined to the males, the median area between the two lines is narrowed and much darker, especially in the two folds, and the red flush is less developed; — the form subarcta Stgr. from Sicily, Palestine, and western Siberia, has longer wings and no red tints whatever except the praesubmarginal shade; this form will, I feel sure, be proved distinct; on the other hand the darker grey and fuscous tints may be reduced and the whole forewing suffused with rosy brown, the whole thorax also showing rufous. - ab. subrosea this is a common form in England; – onychina H.-Sch. shows a still further reduction of the dark tints, the whole forewing being creamy grey, the usual darker median area and the shade before submarginal line showing in certain lights pale golden brownish; the hindwing pale grey; this form occurs in Heligoland, Norderney, and other islands, the colouration being assimilated to the sandy coasts. Some forms are very similar to Mesoligia furuncula A certain identification necessitates study of the genitalia. But this too is problematic.

== Subspecies ==
- Oligia literosa kutchilou Brandt, 1939
- Mesoligia literosa minorasia Rezbanyai-Reser, 1998
- Mesoligia literosa siciliana Rezbanyai-Reser, 1998

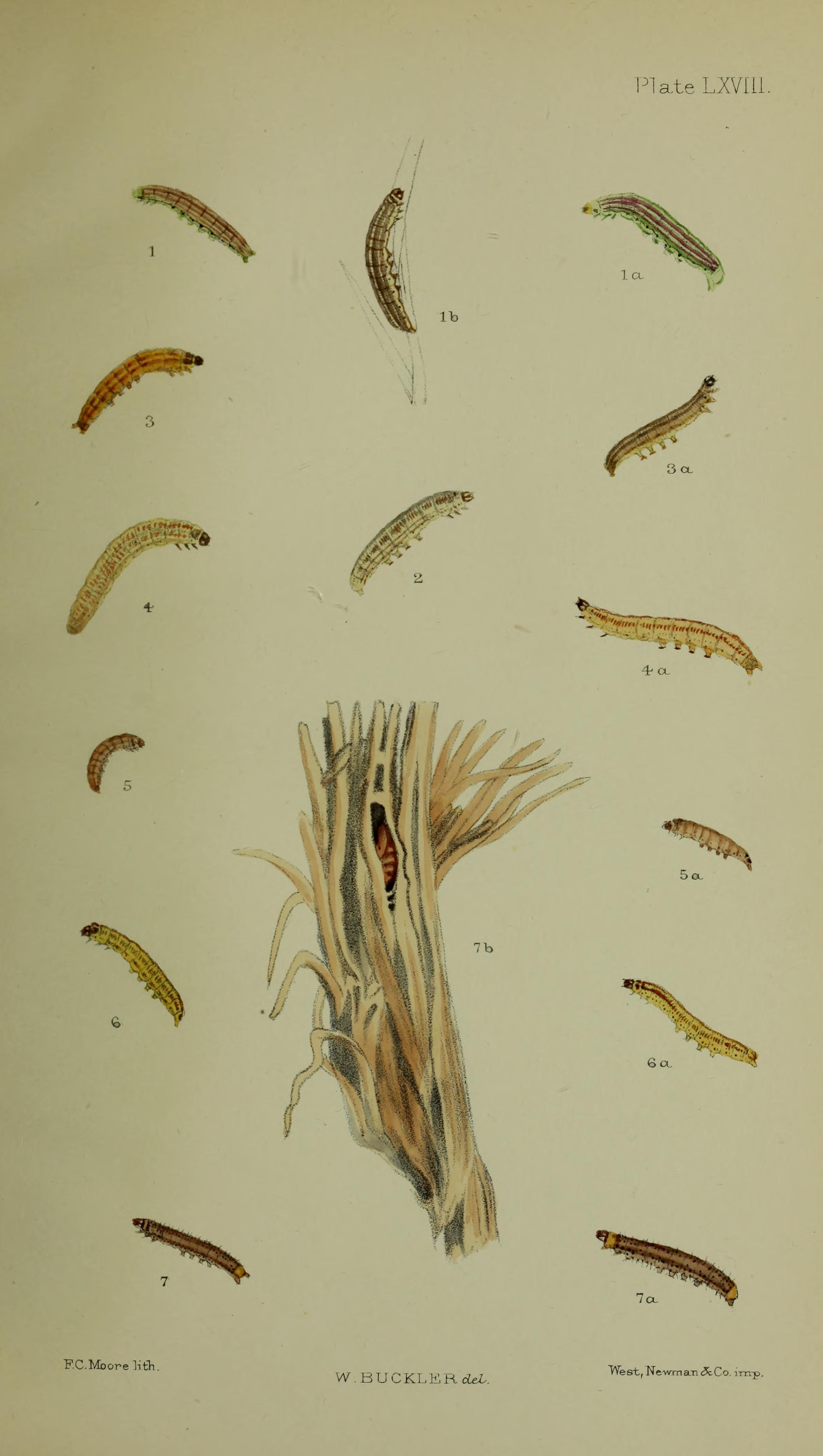
Fig.3, 3a larva after last moult

== Biology ==
The moth flies in July and August.

Larva either yellowish with two broad reddish subdorsal lines, or greenish yellow with grey subdorsal and lateral lines; head and thoracic plate black brown. The larva of the coast form, according to Aurivillius, is whitish with the dorsum reddish and small brown head. The larvae overwinter and feed on various grasses, including glaucous sedge and cock's-foot.
