= Al Shaqab =

Equestrian center in Qatar

- Formation: 1992
- Type: Equestrian Centre
- Location: Qatar
- Parent organization: Qatar Foundation
- Website: alshaqab.com

Al Shaqab (Arabic: الشقب) is Qatar Foundation’s (QF) equestrian center in the Al Shagub district, Qatar. Founded in 1992 by Sheikh Hamad Bin Khalifa Al-Thani, Emir of Qatar, Al Shaqab joined QF in 2004. Al Shaqab is now an important equine education resource center and focuses on breeding of Arabian horses.

Al Shaqab is also a hub for intercultural activities. It holds international equestrian events which brings in visitors from around the world. By preserving and showcases Arabian horses, which are symbols of Qatari culture. In this way, Al Shaqab promotes understanding and appreciation of Qatar’s traditions on a global stage. The CHI Al Shaqab event, for example, attracts equestrian athletes and audiences from over 30 countries every year (Horse Show Jumping TV, 2023).

== History ==
Centuries before natural gas and petroleum gave prominence to Qatar as one of the world's fastest growing economies, the country was known for its prized Arabian horses.

When the Al Thani ancestors, the ruling family of the State of Qatar, migrated out of the Arabian Desert three centuries ago to settle in Qatar, the Arabian horse was a vital part of daily life. The Arabian horse played an important role in the founding of Qatar.

Arabian horses are more than animals in Qatar; they are symbols of pride, tradition, and resilience. Historically, these horses were vital to the Bedouin way of life in the desert, as they provided transportation, survival, and companionship (Schiettecatte & Zouache, 2017). Today, Al Shaqab’s efforts to preserve the Arabian horse breed reflect a deep respect for this heritage. As noted by Derry (2023), Arabian horses symbolize the strength and cultural identity of the Qatari people. By maintaining breeding programs and hosting events focused on these horses, Al Shaqab makes sure that their importance continues to attract attention locally and globally.

Al Shaqab takes its name from a historic battle against the Ottomans. Taking place in the town of Al Rayyan in 1893, the Battle of Al Wajbah, or Al Shaqab as it is also known, saw the Qataris, led by Sheikh Jassim bin Mohammed Al Thani, defeat the Ottomans. This historic battle eventually led to Qatar's independence.

The emir Sheikh Hamad Bin Khalifa Al Thani established Al Shaqab in 1992. In honour of his ancestor, Sheikh Jassim bin Mohammed Al Thani, he chose to establish the breeding farm at the site of the Al Shaqab battle. In 2004, Al Shaqab became a member of Qatar Foundation.

The facility covers some 980,000 square metres and has a stable capacity for more than 400 horses.

The breeding program is intended to preserve the Arabian breed. One of the most famous horses bred at Al Shaqab is Marwan Al Shaqab, a legendary Arabian stallion who has won numerous international awards for his beauty and pedigree. He represents the pinnacle of Al Shaqab’s breeding excellence and has contributed to the global reputation of Arabian horses. Marwan Al Shaqab’s legacy is a testament to Al Shaqab’s commitment to preserving and promoting the Arabian horse as a symbol of Qatari heritage (Al Shaqab Official Website).

The breeding program is divided into three categories: international Arabian horses, combining all Arabian bloodlines; straight Egyptian Arabians, as defined by the Pyramid Society; and the traditional Qatari bloodlines of the past.

In 2008, the Al Shaqab team finished second out of the 24 competing countries to earn the silver medal in the competition.

== CHI Al Shaqab ==
Al Shaqab is host of the annual international horse show, the CHI Al Shaqab. CHI Al Shaqab usually runs end of February/beginning of March. The first edition of the CHI was in 2013 and became since the start the biggest horse show in Asia and Middle East region. The 5* Show Jumping and Dressage competitions are one of the highlights of the CHI. Also Para-equestrian, Vaulting and Endurance are equestrian disciplines that were part of the show.

In addition to the CHI Al Shaqab event, Al Shaqab organizes the Al Shaqab League, a series of national equestrian competitions aimed at nurturing local talent and promoting equestrian sports within Qatar. The league provides a platform for Qatari riders to gain experience and excel in disciplines such as show jumping (Al Shaqab League).

Al Shaqab is also one of the locations for the Global Champions Tour.

== Intercultural communication through events ==
CHI Al Shaqab is a premier equestrian competition and a platform for intercultural communication and global engagement. Since its launch in 2013, the event has welcomed participants from over 30 countries to promote cultural exchange and collaboration (Horse Show Jumping TV, 2023).

The event features Olympic disciplines, including show jumping, dressage, and para-dressage, which unite athletes and spectators from diverse backgrounds. It also showcases Qatari hospitality and traditions, which give visitors an opportunity to learn more about the country's heritage. According to Al Shaqab’s official website, the event aims to connect equestrian enthusiasts while promoting mutual appreciation for global equestrian cultures (Al Shaqab Official Website).

Initiatives like CHI Al Shaqab reflect Qatar's broader commitment to cultural exchange through sport. They contribute to global mutual respect and understanding, as noted by Rogers et al. (2023) in their analysis of cross-cultural equine welfare programs

== Educational programs at Al Shaqab ==
Al Shaqab offers educational workshops and training sessions for visitors of all ages and nationalities. These programs teach participants about the care, breeding, and training of Arabian horses, which emphasize their historical and cultural significance in Qatar. For example, workshops include hands-on demonstrations of traditional horse grooming techniques, which reflect centuries-old Qatari customs (Adelman & Thompson, 2017). International visitors often describe these sessions as eye-opening experiences that deepen their appreciation for Qatari heritage. Such initiatives preserve local knowledge and create opportunities for meaningful cultural exchange.

== Global partnerships and cultural collaboration ==
Al Shaqab collaborates with organizations like the International Federation for Equestrian Sports (FEI) to promote equine welfare and cultural understanding. These partnerships showcase Qatar’s dedication to both traditional and modern values in equestrian sports. For instance, joint efforts with FEI focus on improving horse welfare standards, which is a shared goal across different cultures (Rogers et al., 2023). These collaborations also feature the Arabian horse as a global symbol of excellence and cultural heritage, which bridges gaps between nations and cultivating mutual respect.

== See also ==
- Qatar National Day
- Equestrianism in Qatar
