= Equestrianism in Qatar =

Equestrianism and horse racing in Middle East

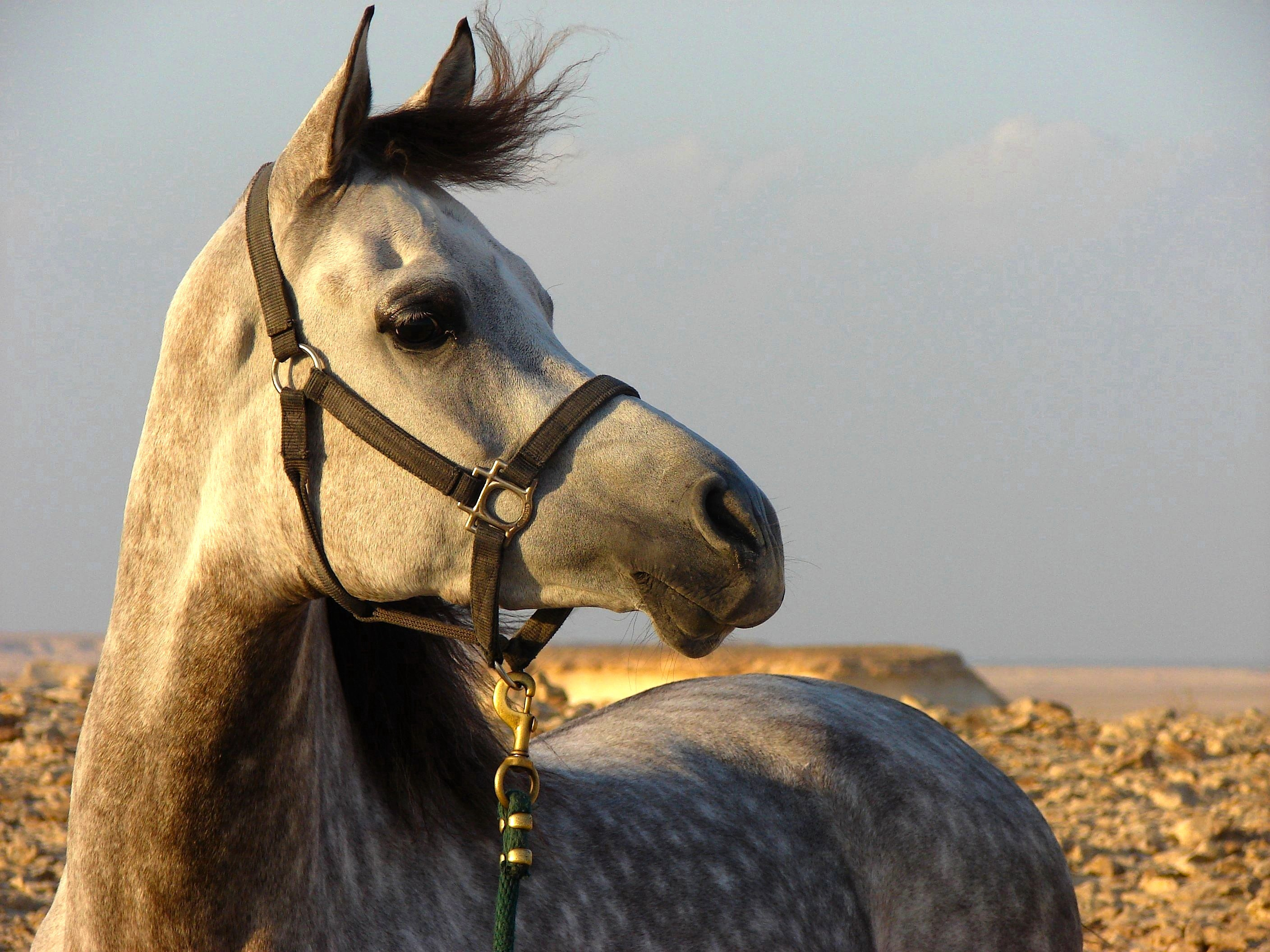
Arabian horse in Qatar desert

Equestrianism in Qatar holds significant economic and cultural importance. Following the Emirate's independence in 1971, the Al Thani family invested to make Qatar one of the major players in horse racing and equestrian sports. The Qatar Racing and Equestrian Club (QREC) was established in 1975, and the prestigious Al Shaqab stables were created in 1992. Today, Qatar is home to elite riders and world-renowned purebred Arabian horses. Since the early 21st century, the country has hosted lucrative horse races and major equestrian competitions, including the Global Champions Tour and international endurance riding competitions. While equestrianism is less prominent in Qatar compared to some neighboring Arab states, the ruling family continues to invest significantly in this sector. However, Qatar's rapid emergence on the international equestrian scene has been accompanied by controversy, particularly concerning allegations of doping in endurance events and horse racing.

== History ==
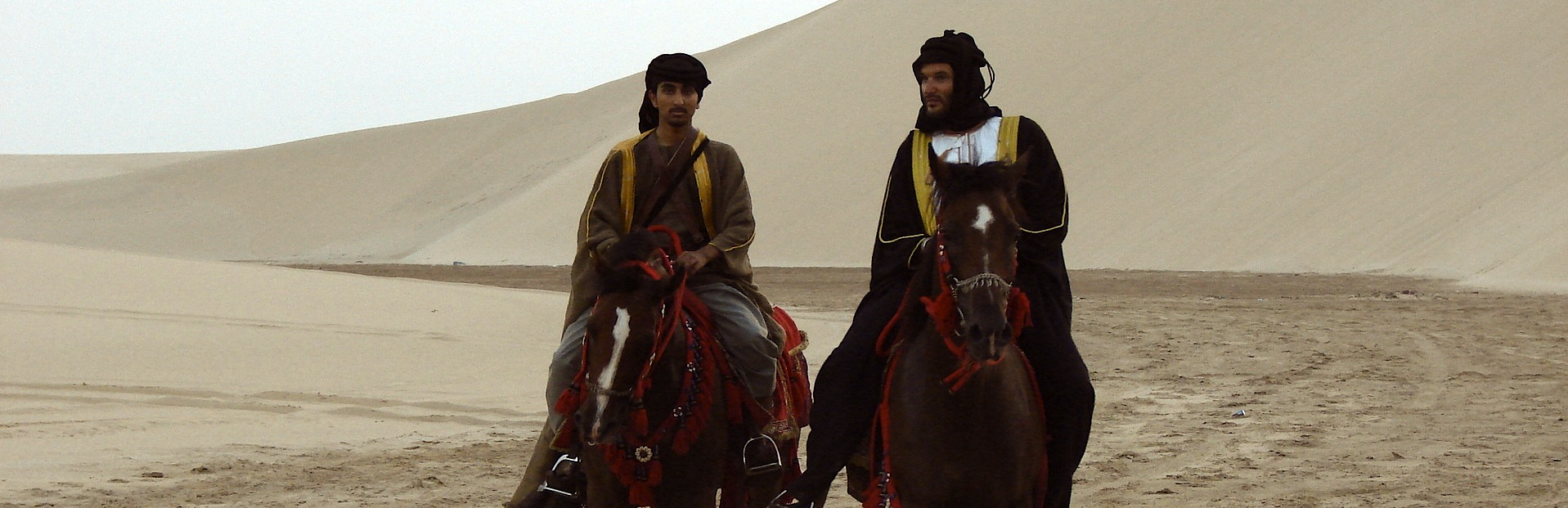
Qatari riders reenacting a historical scene

During the reign of the Umayyads and the Abbasids, the horse trade developed in the territory of present-day Qatar. Purebred Arabian horses have been bred there for at least 400 years. The ancestors of the ruling family migrated to the Arabian Peninsula with their Arabian horses, which played a crucial role in their livelihood. The independence of this small state can be largely attributed to the horses used by Sheikh Jassim ben Mohammed Al Thani's troops, who successfully repelled the Ottomans in 1893. In 1907, there were 250 horses recorded for every 1,430 camels in this sparsely populated region.

Throughout the 1930s, local tribes primarily engaged in horse and camel breeding. The Qatari people have maintained a strong attachment to horses, which are regarded as prestigious gifts, reflecting a long history of nomadic breeding. Following the Emirate's independence in 1971 and its subsequent wealth from gas and oil, there was a strong desire to develop equestrian investments. The Qatar Racing and Equestrian Club (QREC) was established in 1975 with the aim of organizing horse races and promoting the breeding of thoroughbreds. The development of pleasure riding, pony riding, and equestrian stables is more recent, dating back to the beginning of the 21st century, as well as the first exports of horses from Qatar.

In 2006, Sheikh Abdullah bin Khalifa Al Thani invested in the construction of the first racetrack. In September 2009, the Amir Hamad bin Khalifa Al Thani presented a golden horse statuette to Muntadhar al-Zaidi, the Iraqi journalist who threw his shoes at then-President George W. Bush. By 2011, the Al Shaqab stables had evolved into an elite sports complex and became a key component in Qatar's bid to host the 2022 World Equestrian Games. This facility is expected to accommodate all recognized equestrian sports, including eventing, vaulting, and combined driving, which are not yet practiced in Qatar. Equestrianism is one of the most popular Qatari sports, along with football, tennis, and swimming. Doha's equestrian and horse stables are described as "Pharaonic". Each February, an international equestrian festival is held, featuring seven richly endowed races, the most prestigious of which is the "Amir Sword". This event serves as a showcase for the finest Arabian and English horses in the country.

== Breeding and racing of purebred Arabian horses ==
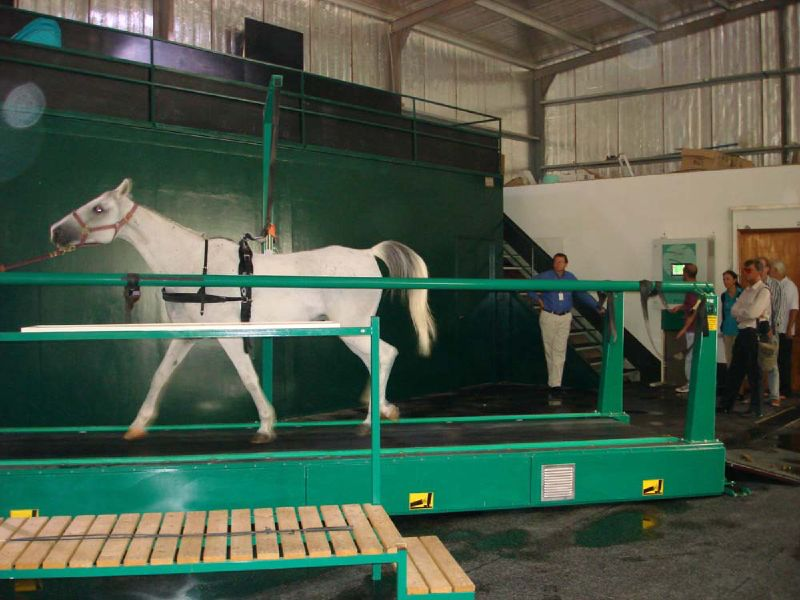
Qatari Arabian horse on a treadmill

In Qatar, two primary breeds of horses are cultivated: the Thoroughbred and the Arabian. The Thoroughbred is primarily bred for racing, while the Arabian horse is also raised for international breed festivals. In 1988, the Umm Qarn breeding facility transitioned from poultry production to focus on breeding Arabian thoroughbreds for racing and endurance events. The Al Shaqab stables, created in 1992 in Al Rayyan, were built on the historic site of Sheikh Jassim bin Mohammed Al Thani's battle against the Ottomans in 1893. This facility has become a flagship for Arabian thoroughbred breeding in Qatar, producing several world champions, including Marwan Al Shaqab. To feed their most prized horses, Qatari breeders import French AOC and Crau hay, often transporting it by air to Qatar.

The annual International Arabian Horse Festival attracts a large part of the Qatari social elite. The development of the Arabian breed and the breeding of Al Shaqab is one of the priorities of the Amir. He finances luxurious facilities for these horses, such as equine treadmills and swimming pools.

== Horse racing ==
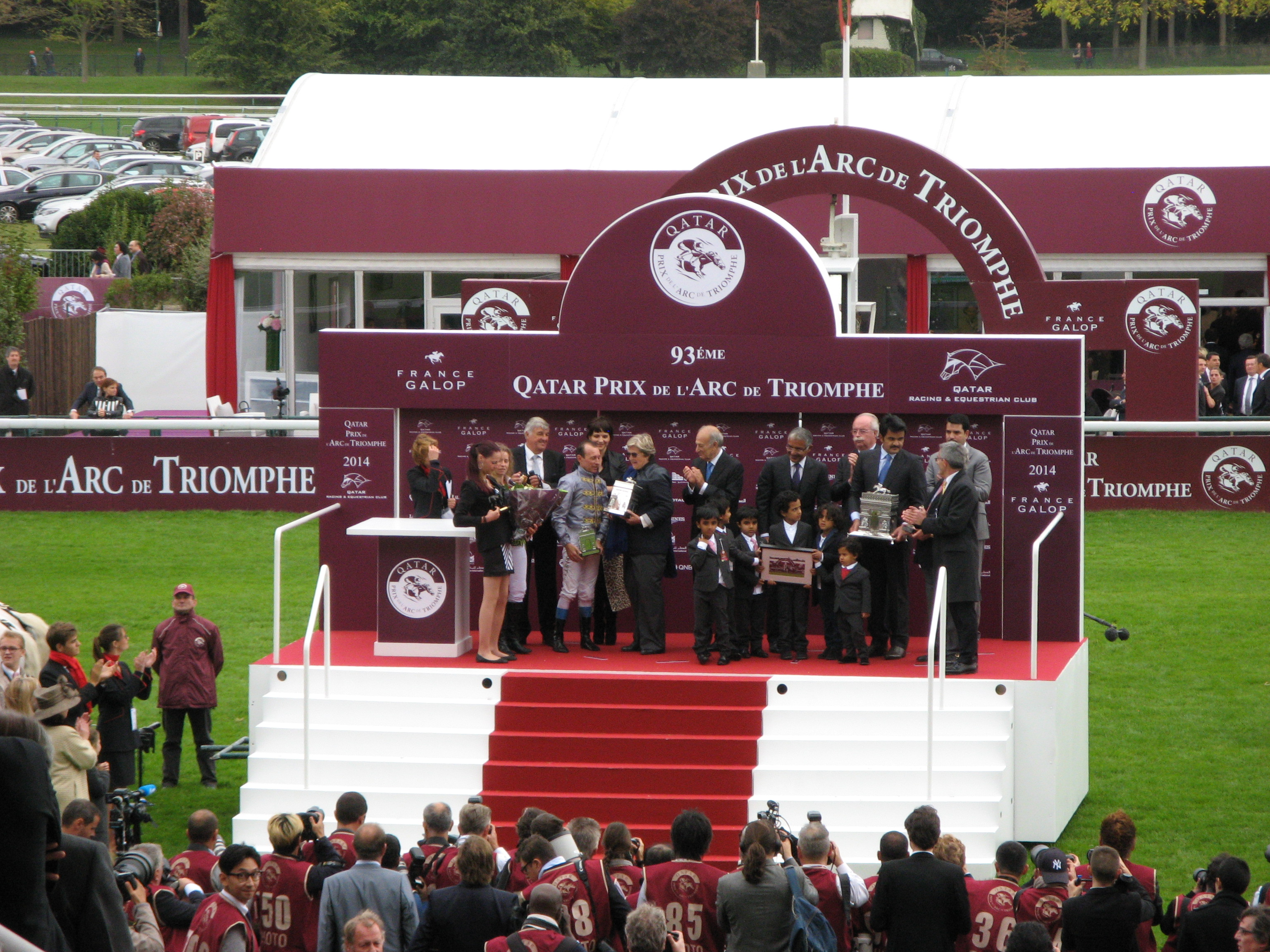
Prize-giving ceremony of the Qatar Prix de l'Arc de Triomphe 2014

The ruling family of Qatar makes substantial investments in horse racing, with the ambition of establishing the world's most successful horse racing organization. The sport is overseen by the Qatar Racing and Equestrian Club (QREC), located in the south of Doha. Qatar's investments include the purchase of stud farms in Europe for Thoroughbred breeding, as well as sponsorships of major races that include naming rights. In 2008, the Prix de l'Arc de Triomphe became the Qatar Prix de l'Arc de Triomphe, doubling its prize money and making it the highest-endowed flat race in Europe. The Champion Stakes, Britain's highest-paid race, is funded by Qatar Investment & Projects Development Holding Company (QIPCO), a Qatari investment group. The Goodwood Festival in England became the Qatar Goodwood Festival in 2015.

Qatar is known for purchasing top racehorses in the racing circuit. Treve, a two-time winner of the Arc in 2013 and 2014, was acquired by Prince Abdullah Joaan Al Thani, one of the Amir's sons, for a reported sum between 8 and 10 million euros. Within the family, there exists a rivalry for supremacy in horse racing; Abdallah ben Khalifa Al Thani, the uncle of the current Amir Tamim ben Hamad Al Thani, is recognized for investing significantly in the sport in France. The Qatari royal family has acquired some of the best Thoroughbred breeding lands, notably in Normandy. They own the oldest stud farm in the Pays d'Auge, Victot-Pontfol with its 16th-century castle, located in Calvados and acquired for about ten million euros. French horse racing officials often extend invitations for dinners and cruises to members of the Al Thani family, reflecting the close ties between Qatar and the European racing community.

== Equestrian sports ==
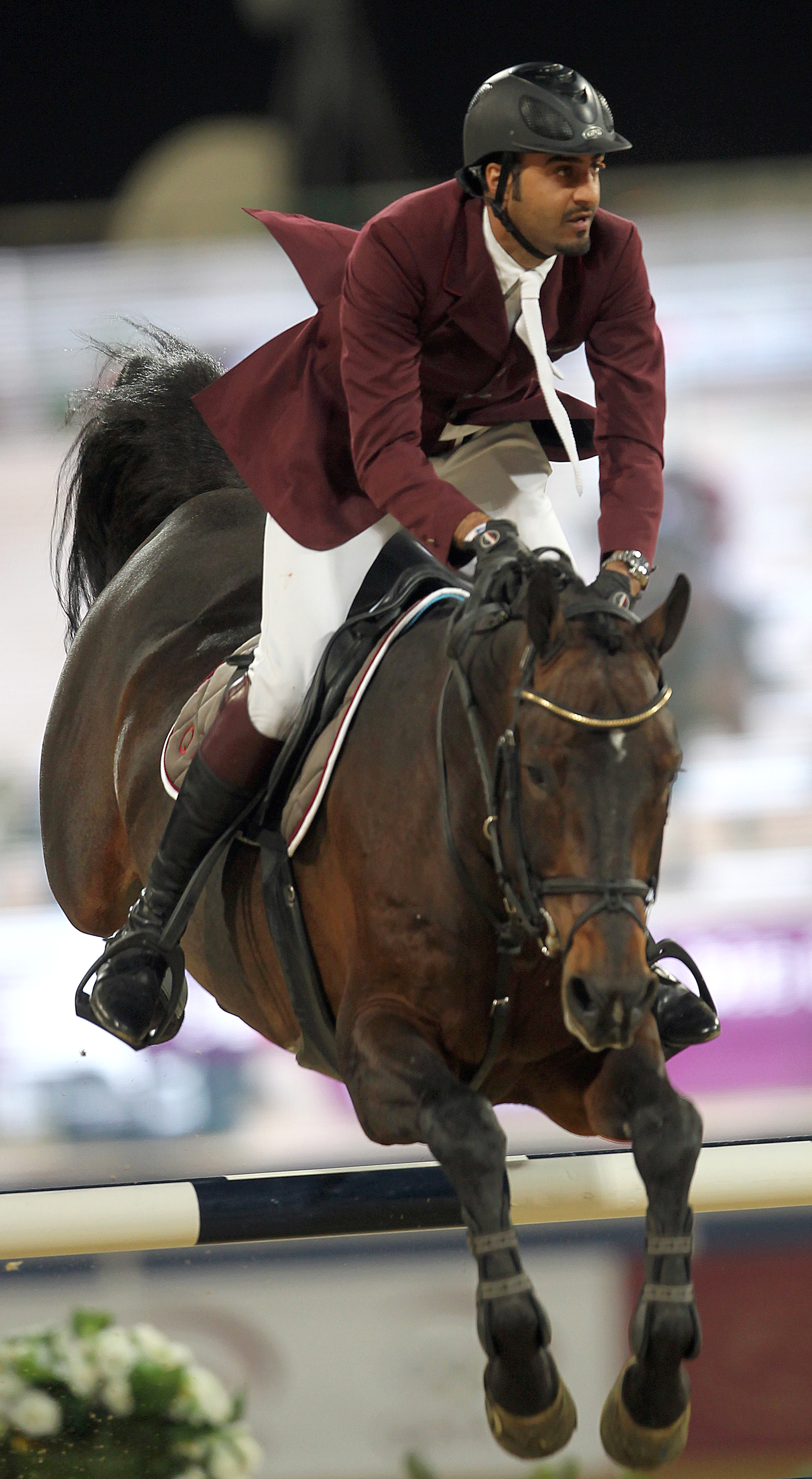
Sheikh Ali bin Khalid Al Thani during the opening of the 2012 Global Champions Tour in Doha

Qatari riders are predominantly male, but women also have the opportunity to compete at the highest levels. As of 2013, women represented approximately 10% of the international equestrian athletes competing for Qatar, according to the International Federation for Equestrian Sports. The country primarily participates in two disciplines: endurance riding and show jumping.

=== Endurance riding ===
Endurance riding is the most widely practiced equestrian sport in Qatar. It is organized by the Qatar Endurance Committee, established in 1994 as part of the Qatar Racing and Equestrian Club. The first endurance race in the emirate took place on March 25, 1994, covering 42 kilometers between Ras Laffan and Ruwais, and was named the "First Qatari Desert Race." Initially, only two relatively short endurance races were held each year. However, the sport gained momentum in 2004 when the Qatar Endurance Committee became affiliated with the Qatari Olympic Committee, leading to the organization of approximately fifteen races annually. Among these, a notable event is the endurance horse race, which spans 120 kilometers on sand.

The development of endurance riding in Qatar may have been motivated by competition with the ruling Al Maktoum family of Dubai, who achieved world champion status after acquiring top horses in the sport. In response, Qatari investors focused on reclaiming the title by purchasing elite French horses. French endurance riders have likened this competitive dynamic to "the purchase of all the soccer teams in Ligue 1 by Qatar and Dubai". As a result of these efforts, Qatar became the world runner-up in the team discipline in 2008. Abdulrahman Saad A.S. Al Sulaiteen won an individual bronze medal at the 2014 FEI World Equestrian Games.

=== Show Jumping ===
In show jumping, Qatar is progressively establishing itself on the international stage. The 2006 Asian Games, held in Doha, saw the victory of Ali Yousuf Ahmad Saad Al Rumaihi, who won the gold medal in the individual competition with his stallion Nagano. Similarly, Qatar secured a second-place finish in show jumping at the 2011 Pan Arab Games. The State actively invests in high-caliber Grand Prix horses, including Kellemoi de Pépita owned by the French rider Michel Robert (2011), and Zorro Z, Castiglione L, Ambiente (2010), and Palloubet d'Halong, the latter purchased for a record sum of 11 million euros and entrusted to Ali Yousuf Ahmad Saad Al Rumaihi. Additionally, the mare Utascha was acquired in December 2013 and assigned to rider Khalid Mohammed Al Emadi.

Doha has hosted the Global Champions Tour finals since 2013. By February 2014, Sheikh Ali bin Khalid Al Thani emerged as Qatar's top show jumping rider, ranked 93rd in the world following a remarkable ascent during the 2012–2013 season, where he climbed 151 places. He has been identified as a rider "to watch" by the International Federation for Equestrian Sports. In fact, Qatar is one of the countries where show jumping is developing the most.

Qatar's investment strategy in show jumping extends beyond the acquisition of elite horses to include comprehensive training programs for Qatari riders. In June 2014, Bassem Hassan Mohammed became the first Qatari rider to win a Global Champions Tour Grand Prix, achieving this feat in Monaco. The Qatari show jumping team, coached by Jan Tops, has been steadily climbing the ranks and is now winning major international competitions. It won its qualification for the 2016 Olympic Games in February 2015, at the FEI Nations Cup in Abu Dhabi.

== The horse in the local culture ==
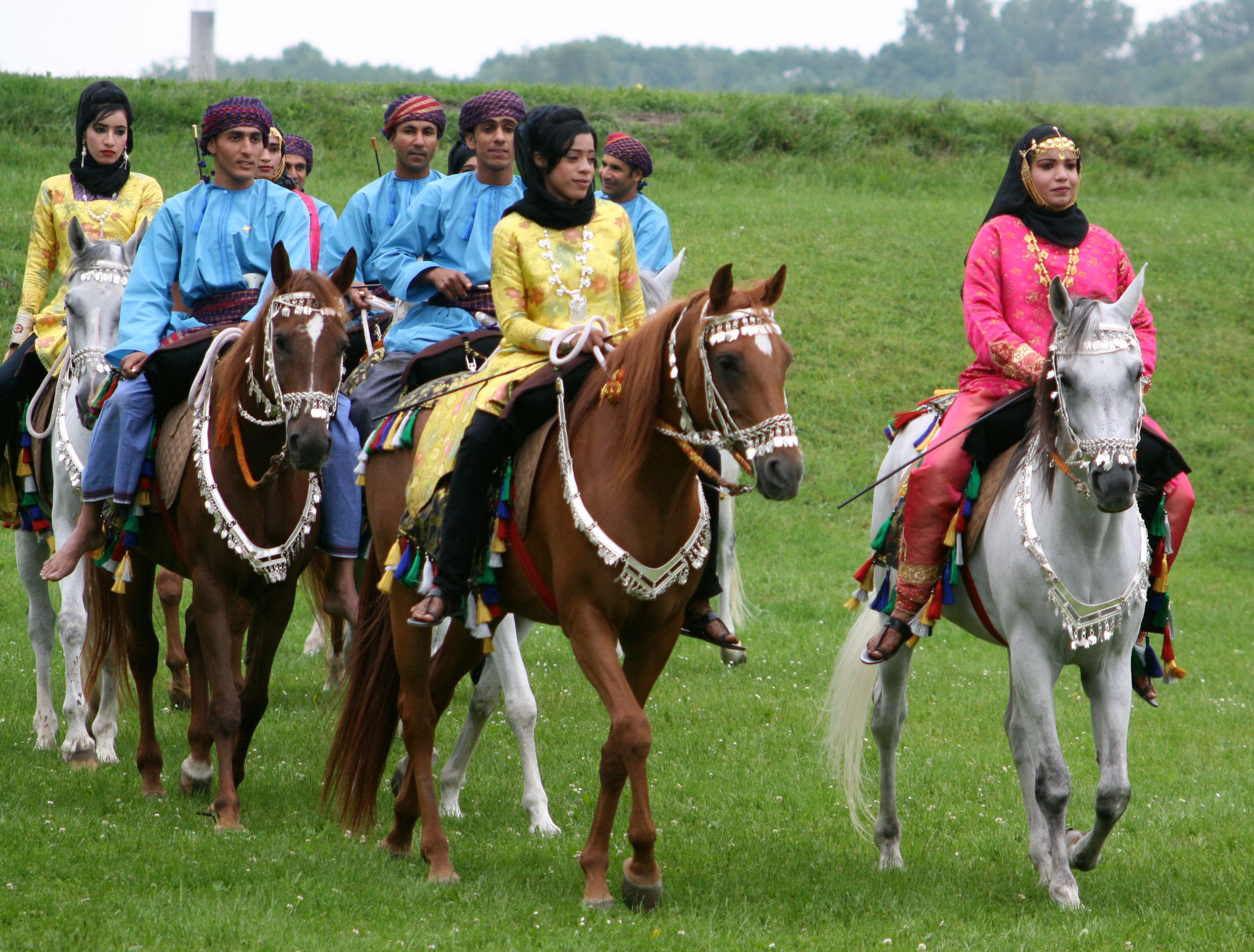
The Royal Omani Cavalry in 2011

The horse, especially the Arabian horse, has always held a great place in the local culture. This prominence can be attributed to the influence of Islam and the Quran, which encourage horse breeding as endorsed by the Prophet Muhammad. Additionally, the cultural heritage of the Qatari Amirs plays a vital role; horse riding and falconry are traditional practices that underscore their power and tribal legacy. This historical context helps explain the substantial investments made by Gulf countries in equestrian and horse activities. However, the perception of the horse has changed over the last century: from a precious gift, the horse has become a "pedestal" to enhance the value of the sovereign family as well as a "common consumer good".

== Controversies ==
Qatar's emergence on the international equestrian and horse racing stage has been accompanied by controversies involving riders and investors. Several Qatari horses have tested positive for doping in endurance riding events, with reports of horses dying from exhaustion following these competitions. These issues became more pronounced in 2012 and 2013, with eighty percent of doping cases in endurance events involving riders from the Middle East, particularly those from the United Arab Emirates, Bahrain, and Qatar. In June 2015, the International Federation for Equestrian Sports responded by sentencing Nasser Khalifa N.J Al Thani to a 27-month ban from competition, due to his horse Brookleigh Caspar testing positive during a 120-kilometer race held in Doha in April 2014.

Another problem is the very hot climate of Qatar, which is unsuitable for sport riding.

Similarly, Qatar's investment in French equestrian sport and horsemanship has caused unease. The mare Kellemoi de Pépita, bought from Michel Robert by Sheikh Ali bin Khalid Al Thani, was one of France's medal chances for the 2012 Summer Olympics. Some French horse racing players also believe that the Qatari monopoly on the best-endowed French races is closing the best races to French trainers.

== See also ==
- Al Shaqab – Equestrian center in Qatar
- Ali Al-Rumaihi – Qatari equestrian (born 1981)
- Ali Al-Thani – Qatari equestrian (born 1982)
- Bassem Hassan Mohammed – Qatari equestrian
- Qatar Foundation – State-led non-profit organization
