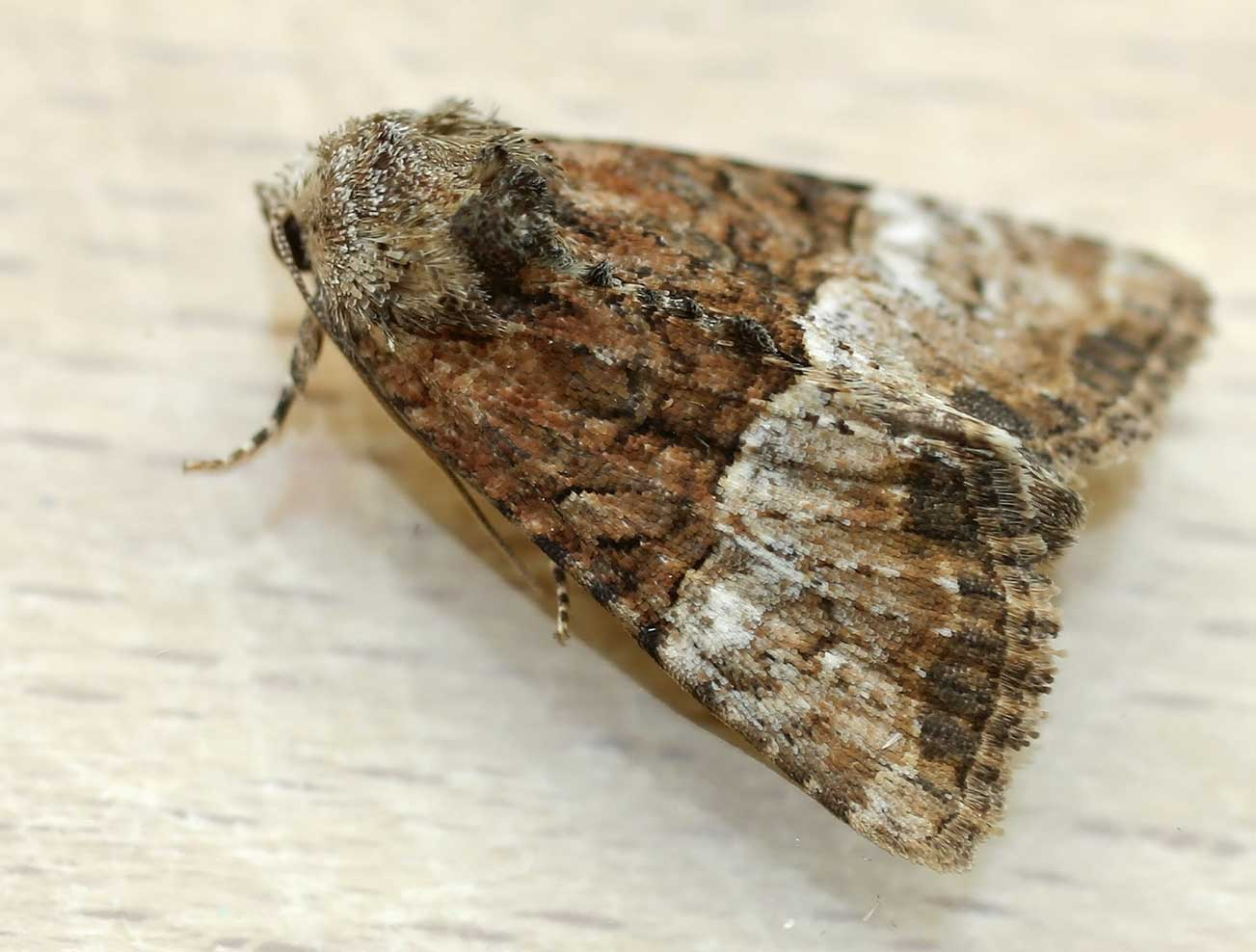
- Mesoligia furuncula

Scientific classification
- Domain: Eukaryota
- Kingdom: Animalia
- Phylum: Arthropoda
- Class: Insecta
- Order: Lepidoptera
- Superfamily: Noctuoidea
- Family: Noctuidae
- Subfamily: Xyleninae
- Genus: Mesoligia; Boursin, 1965

= Mesoligia =

Genus of moths

Mesoligia is a genus of moths of the family Noctuidae.

== Species ==
- Mesoligia algaini Wiltsihre, 1983
- Mesoligia fodinae (Oberthür, 1880)
- Mesoligia furuncula (Denis & Schiffermüller, 1775)
- Mesoligia kettlewelli Wiltshire, 1983
- Mesoligia literosa (Haworth, 1809)
- Mesoligia prolai Berio, 1974
