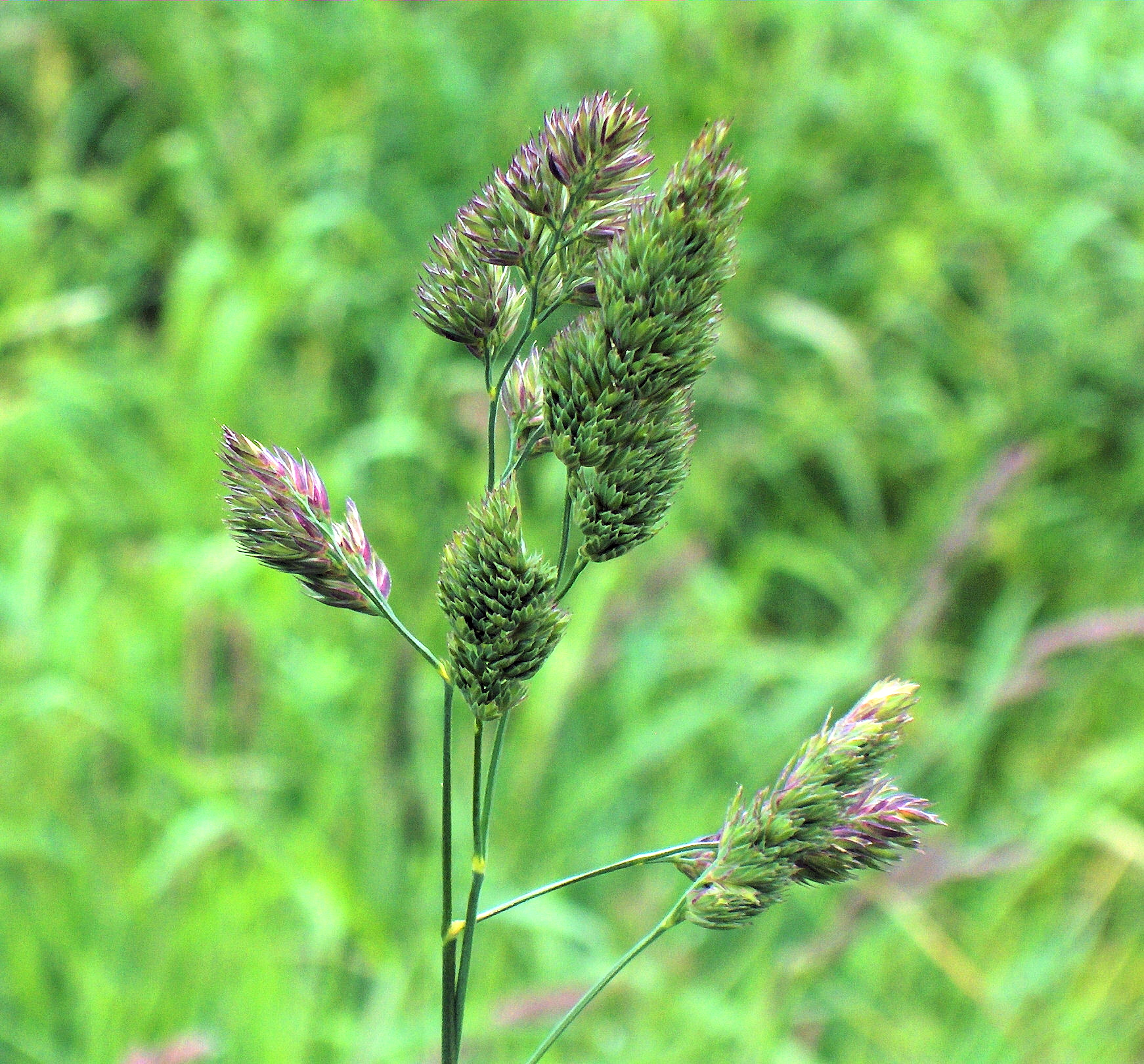
- Dactylis glomerata in Dornoch, Scotland

Scientific classification
- Kingdom: Plantae
- Clade: Embryophytes
- Clade: Tracheophytes
- Clade: Angiosperms
- Clade: Monocots
- Clade: Commelinids
- Order: Poales
- Family: Poaceae
- Subfamily: Pooideae
- Supertribe: Poodae
- Tribe: Poeae
- Subtribe: Dactylidinae
- Genus: Dactylis; L. (1753)

Species
- Dactylis glomerata L.; Dactylis smithii Link

Synonyms
- Trachypoa Bubani (1901), nom. superfl.; Dactilis Neck. (1768)

= Dactylis =

Genus of flowering plants in the grass family

Dactylis is a genus of Eurasian and North African plants in the bluegrass subfamily within the grass family. Dactylis is native to North Africa, they are found throughout the world, and are an invasive species. They are known in English as cock's-foot or cocksfoot grasses, also sometimes as orchard grasses.

== Taxonomy ==
The genus has been treated as containing only a single species Dactylis glomerata by many authors, treating variation in the genus at only subspecific rank within D. glomerata, but more recently, there has been a trend to accept two species, while some authors accept even more species in the genus, particularly island endemic species in Macaronesia.

=== Accepted species ===
Two species are currently accepted.

- Dactylis glomerata L. – Eurasia and North Africa; naturalized in southern Africa, Australia, the Americas, and various oceanic islands
- Dactylis smithii Link – Canary Islands, Cape Verde, Madeira

=== Formerly included ===
Many species now considered better suited to other genera: Aeluropus, Ammochloa, Cutandia, Desmostachya, Dinebra, Elytrophorus, Eragrostis, Festuca, Koeleria, Odyssea, Poa, Rostraria, Schismus, Spartina, Tribolium, Trisetaria, and Wangenheimia.

- Dactylis fasciculata Lam. – now Spartina alterniflora
- Dactylis maritima Walter – now Spartina alterniflora

== Description ==
Dactylis species are perennial grasses, forming dense tussocks growing to 15–140 centimetres (5.9–55 in) tall, with leaves 20–50 cm (7.9–19.7 in) long and up to 1.5 cm broad, and distinctive tufted triangular flowerheads comprising a panicle 10–15 cm (3.9–5.9 in) long, turning pale grey-brown at seed maturity. The spikelets are 5–9 mm long, typically containing two to five flowers. The stems have a flattened base, which distinguishes them from many other grasses.

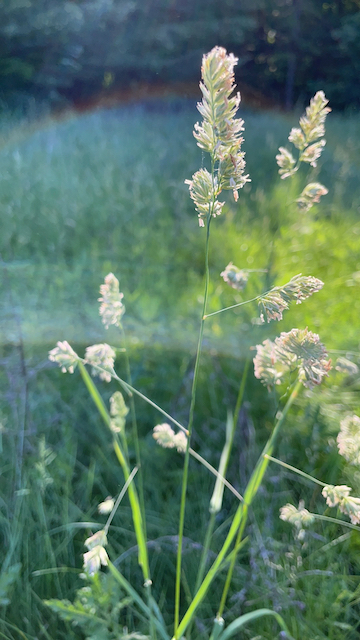
Dactylis glomerata in Ohio, US

== Ecology ==
Dactylis is most commonly known as orchard grass. Orchard grasses are suited for habitats like waste lands and meadows. These grasses are able to grow in dry and mildly wet areas. They are a food source for many species of insects and birds. The insect and animals consume the grass's seeds, leaves, and roots. Dactylis, orchard grass, supports meadow ecosystems by feeding many insects and birds that dominate the areas; these species include: beetles, grasshoppers, larvae, caterpillars, sparrows, and horned larks. Snakes, small mammals, and insects also use orchard grass as a means of shelter and stealth through grass lands.

== Cytology ==
The taxa show several different levels of polyploidy. The taxa show three levels of polyploidy, including tetraploid, diploid, and hexaploidy. Dactylis glomerata subsp. glomerata and D. glomerata subsp. hispanica are tetraploid forms with 28 chromosomes. Several of the other taxa, including D. glomerata. subsp. himalayensis (syn. D. himalayensis), D. glomerata subsp. lobata (syn. D. polygama), D. metlesicsii, and some forms of D. smithii, are diploid with 2n = 14; hexaploids with 42 chromosomes also occur rarely. Dactylis are reproductively able to produce natural triploid and pentaploid. This occurs in habitats of large populations of diploid and tetraploid Dactylis showing one way gene flow.

== See also ==
- Foin de Crau
