= Pianissima =

Arabian mare

- Breed: Arabian
- Sire: Gazal al Shaqab
- Grandsire: Anaza El Farid
- Dam: Pianosa
- Maternal grandsire: Eukaliptus
- Sex: Mare
- Foaled: 2003
- Died: 2015
- Country: Poland
- Color: Bay
- Breeder: Janów Podlaski Stud Farm, Poland
- Owner: Janów Podlaski Stud Farm, Poland

Honors
- World Champion and "European Triple Crown" Winner
- Last updated on: March 13, 2008 “Platinum Medal” World Championship 2013 Salon du Cheval Paris.

Pianissima (January 13, 2003 - October 2015) was an Arabian mare foaled at Janów Podlaski State Stud in Poland. She established a remarkable record in the halter show ring. She was bay, with no white markings.

== Show Record ==
Pianissima was the only mare in the history of the breed to be twice named European Triple Crown winner (All Nations Cup Aachen, European Championship Moorsele, and World Championship Paris), as well as Polish National Junior Champion/Best in Show as both a junior and senior mare. She was the only Arabian ever to claim all titles in the same year (2004 and 2008), and on every occasion by unanimous decision.

2004 - Polish Spring Champion Filly Polish Spring Show, Best in Show Polish Spring Show, Falborek Show Champion Filly, Best in Show Falborek Arabian Show, Polish National Champion Filly, Best in Show Polish National Show, ANC Champion Filly All Nations Cup - Aachen, European Champion Filly, World Champion Filly, winner of the Arabian Triple Crown, junior (The Arabian triple Crown consists of being Champion at Aachen, European, World)

2006 - US Nat. Champion Junior Mare, Scottsdale Champion, 3 year old Mares

2008 - Champion Mare Al Khalediah Arabian Horse Show, Polish National Champion Mare, Best in Show Polish National Show. Also All Nations Cup Champion Mare, European Champion Mare, World Champion Mare—the European Arabian halter "Triple Crown".

2013 - “Platinum Medal” Mare World Championship Paris Salon du cheval

== Background ==
Pianissima was by Gazal al Shaqab, and out of the Polish mare Pianosa, making her a half sibling to Marwan al Shaqab. Her sireline is Saklawi I, and her damline is Szamrajowka. From 2005-2007 she was leased to Aria Arabians in the United States, where she was shown at halter by trainer and handler Greg Gallun. She then returned to Poland for a short period of time, and returned to the US in 2009. As of 2009, Pianissima had produced six foals, five by embryo transfer, and one by natural birth. Her offspring have sold well by the current price standard of the Arabian industry, including embryo at €175,000 (US$214,237.41) at the Pride of Poland sale.

== Offspring ==
- EVG Piassondra - 2007 filly by Pershahn El Jamaal (via ET [embryo transfer])
- Nismat Albidayer - 2007 filly by Ames Charisma (via ET)
- PA Encore - 2008 colt by Enzo (via ET)
- AJ Penelope - 2008 filly by El Nabila B (via ET)
- Pia - 2009 filly by Ganges (via natural birth)
- Royal T Phorte - 2010 colt by Eden C
- Pianova - 2011 filly by Eden C (via natural birth)
- Prometeusz - 2012 colt by Fa El Shawan (via natural birth)
- Pamina - 2015 filly by Pogrom (via natural birth)
