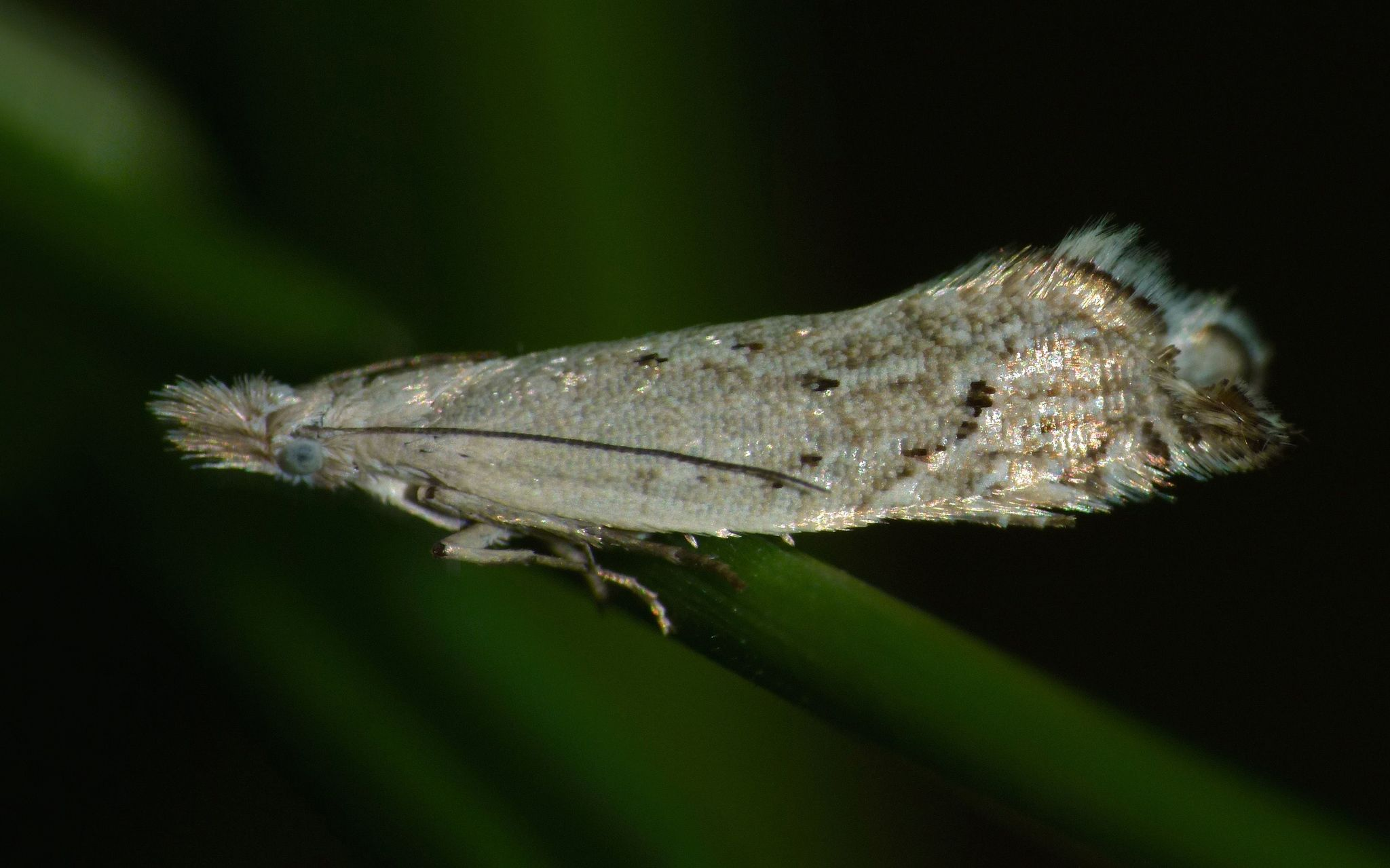

Scientific classification
- Kingdom: Animalia
- Phylum: Arthropoda
- Clade: Pancrustacea
- Class: Insecta
- Order: Lepidoptera
- Family: Glyphipterigidae
- Genus: Glyphipterix
- Species: G. achlyoessa

Binomial name
- Glyphipterix achlyoessa (Meyrick, 1880)

Synonyms
- Phryganostola achlyoessa Meyrick, 1880; Glyphipteryx achlyoessa (Meyrick, 1880)

= Glyphipterix achlyoessa =

Species of moth endemic to New Zealand

Glyphipterix achlyoessa, commonly known as the cocksfoot stem borer, is a species of moth in the family Glyphipterigidae. It is endemic to New Zealand and can be found throughout the country. This species inhabits meadows and open grasslands. The larvae are hosted by species in the genus Juncus as well as by the species Dactylis glomerata. Adult moths are commonly on the wing from October to December.

== Taxonomy ==
This species was first described by Edward Meyrick in 1880 and named Phryganostola achlyoessa. Meyrick used material he collected at the Wellington Botanic Garden at dusk in January. In 1915 Meyrick placed this species in the genus Glyphipteryx. George Hudson discussed and illustrated this species under the name Glyphipteryx achlyoessa in 1928. In 1986 the genus Glyphipteryx was judged an unjustified emendation of Glyphipterix Hübner so this species is now known as Glyphipterix achlyoessa. The male holotype specimen is held at the Natural History Museum, London.

== Description ==
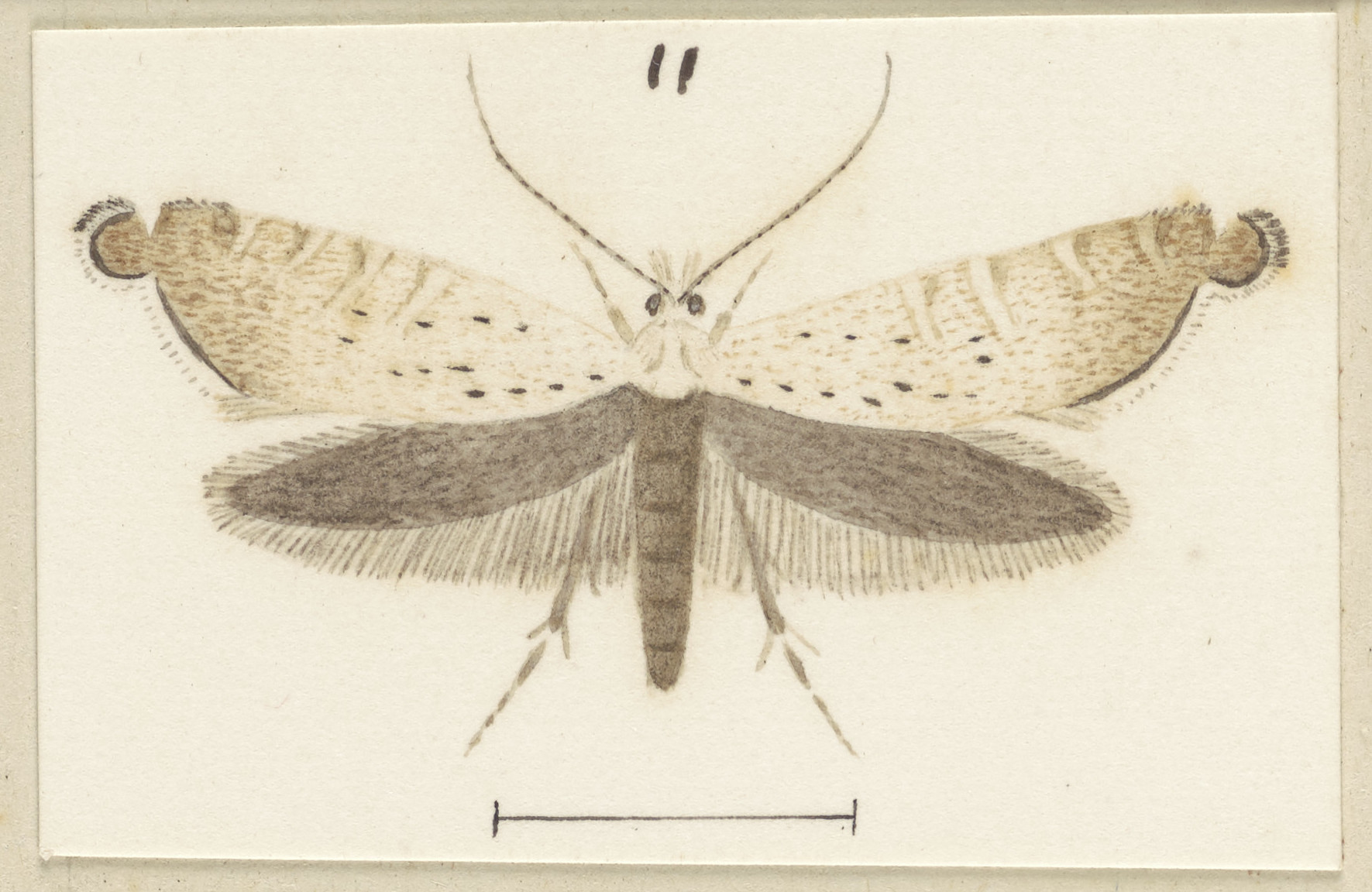
Female Glyphipterix achlyoessa.

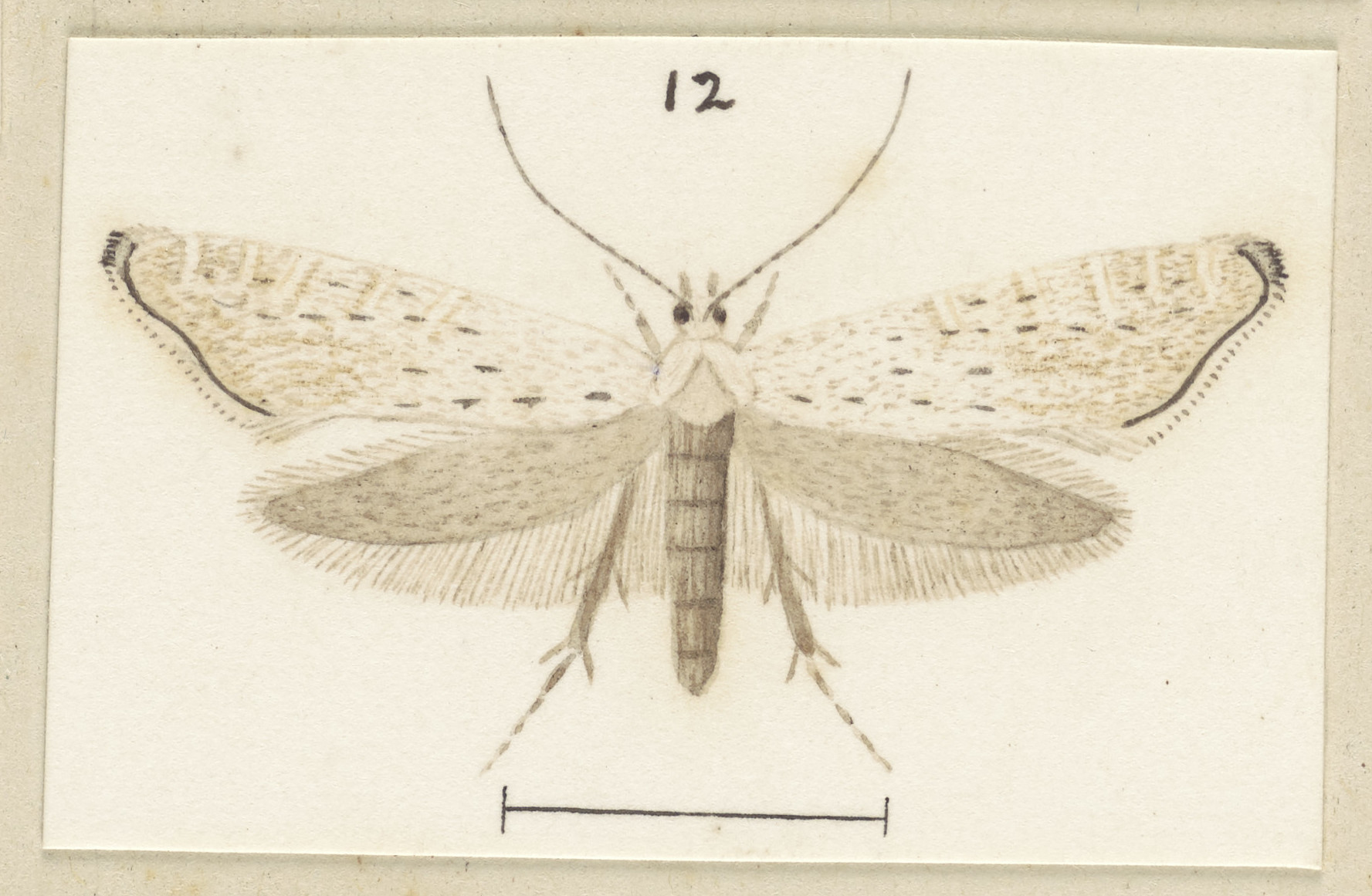
Male Glyphipterix achlyoessa.

Meyrick described the species as follows:

Head and thorax whitish-grey. Palpi whitish-grey, mixed with dark fuscous, second joint beneath with a long loose prejecting fringe of hairs. Antennae dark fuscous. Abdomen elongate, dark fuscous. Legs pale ochreous-grey. Fore-wings elongate, narrow, hind-margin strongly sinuate below apex; pale whitish-grey, faintly strigulated transversely with darker; a few solitary black scales, tending to be arranged longitudinally on fold and lower median vein; cilia whitish, with an obscure dark fuscous apical hook, basal f separated by a blackish line and dark smoky-grey. Hind-wings and cilia fuscous-grey.

== Distribution ==
This moth is endemic to New Zealand and is found throughout the country. It is regarded as being common.

== Lifecycle and behaviour ==
This species is on the wing from October to December. It is day flying. When disturbed it is likely to fly a short distance before landing on a grass stem.

== Habitat and host plant ==
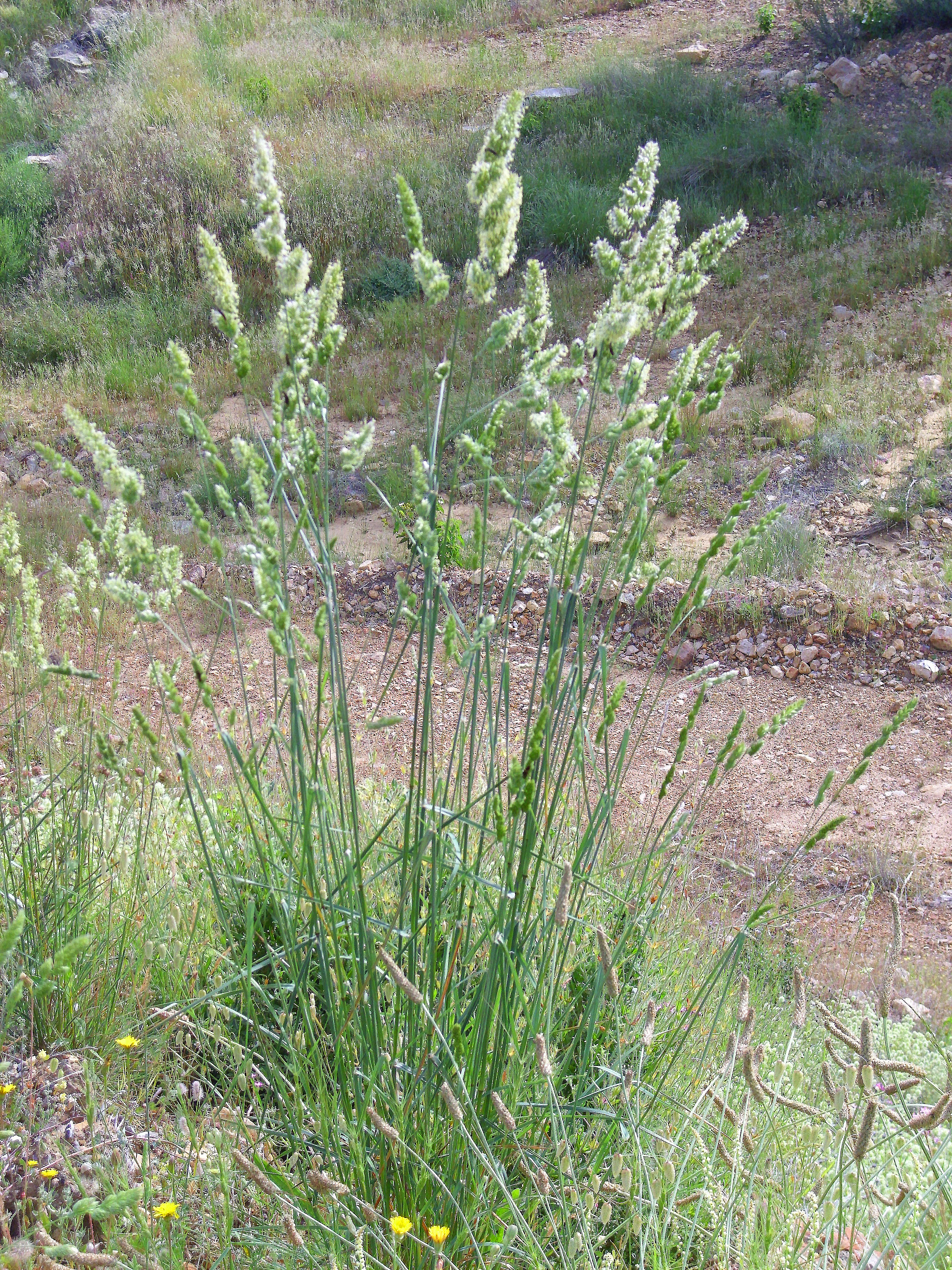
Larval host species Dactylis glomerata.

This species prefers to inhabit meadows and grassy open spaces. It appears to prefer introduced grass species. A host plant for this species is Dactylis glomerata. Larvae have also been found boring into Juncus species.
