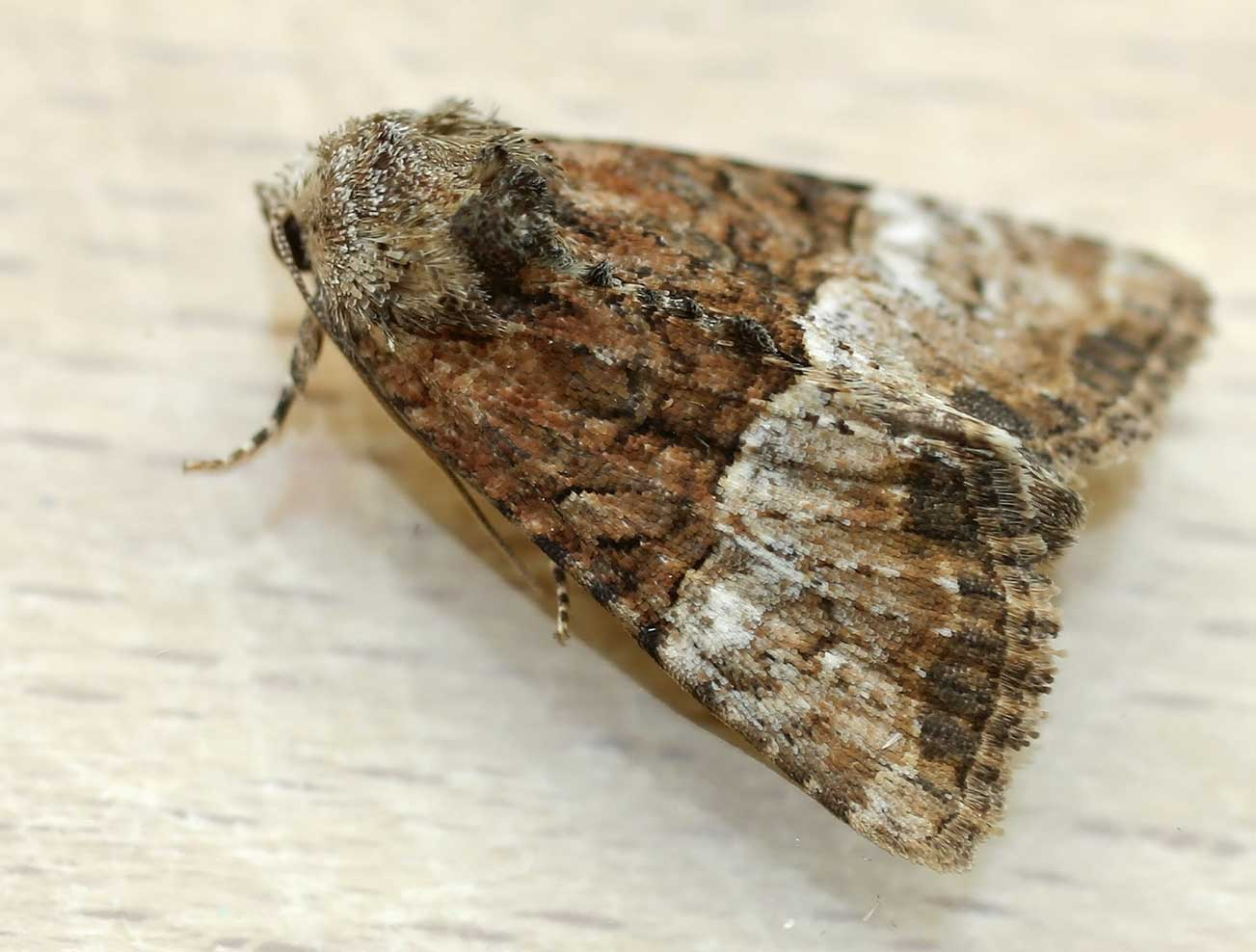

Scientific classification
- Kingdom: Animalia
- Phylum: Arthropoda
- Clade: Pancrustacea
- Class: Insecta
- Order: Lepidoptera
- Superfamily: Noctuoidea
- Family: Noctuidae
- Genus: Mesoligia
- Species: M. furuncula

Binomial name
- Mesoligia furuncula (Denis & Schiffermüller, 1775)

= Mesoligia furuncula =

Species of moth

Mesoligia furuncula, the cloaked minor, is a moth of the family Noctuoidea. It is found in the Palearctic realm (Europe, northwest Africa, Russia, Siberia, Japan, north Iran, Afghanistan, and China (Qinghai and Shaanxi).

== Description ==
The wingspan is 22–28 mm. The length of the forewings is 10–12 mm. The typical form has the forewing sharply demarcated between a pale distal field and a rufous basal field. The colour and pattern is highly variable and furuncula may look like a lot of the species in the genus Oligia which can be separated from all but Mesoligia literosa by details of the genitalia. A study of the genitalia of European and Asian specimens of the two Mesoligia species literosa Haworth and furuncula Denis & Schiffermüller showed however that there is no significant intra-specific variation, in these two closely related Oligia species.

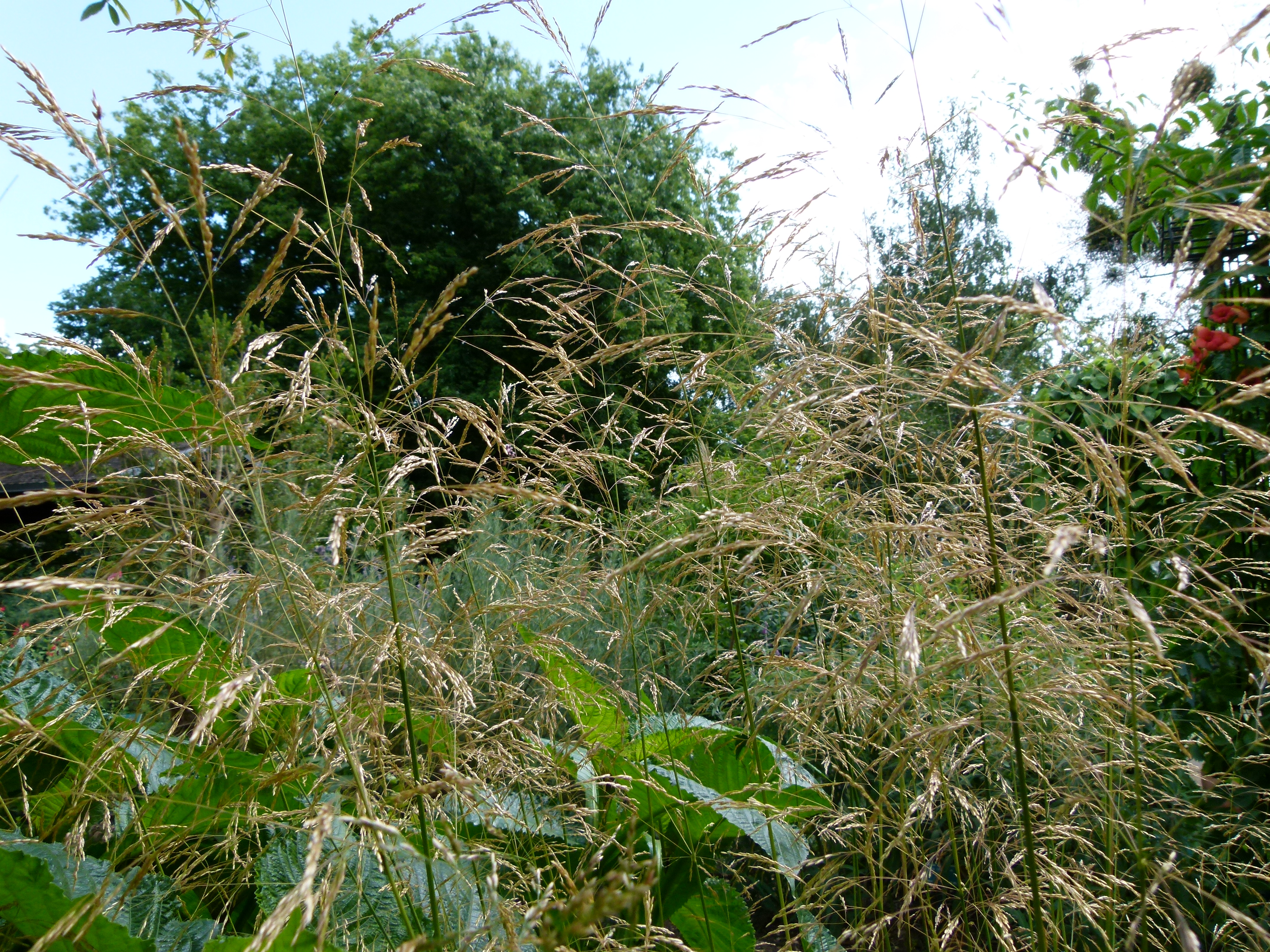
Habitat

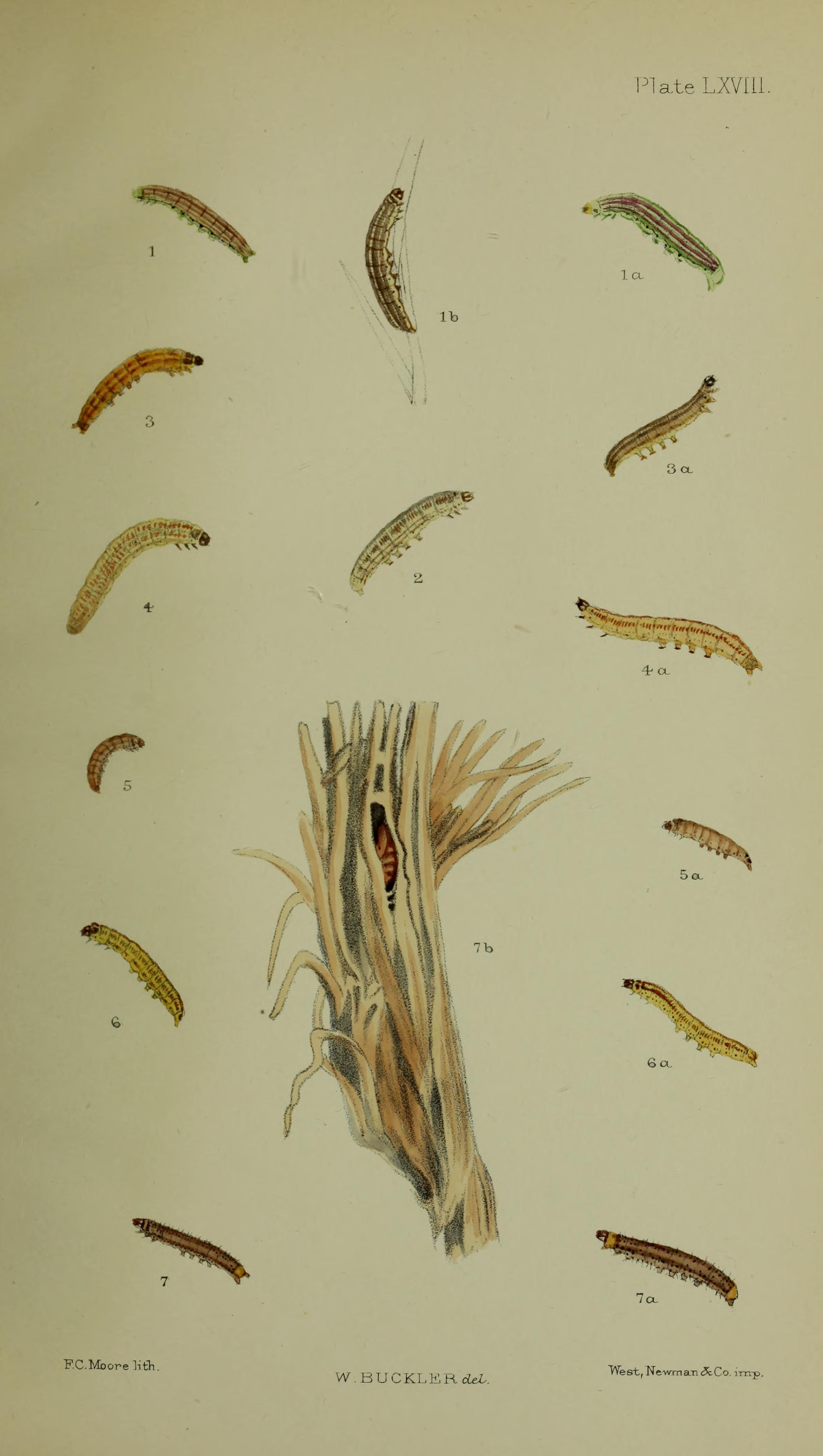
Fig.4, 4a larva after last moult

== Biology ==
The moth flies in one generation from late June to mid September.

The larvae feed on various grasses such as Tufted Hair-grass, Festuca ovina, and Arrhenatherum elatius.

== Notes ==
1. The flight season refers to Belgium and The Netherlands. This may vary in other parts of the range.
