= Foin de Crau =

Crau hay production

Crau hay
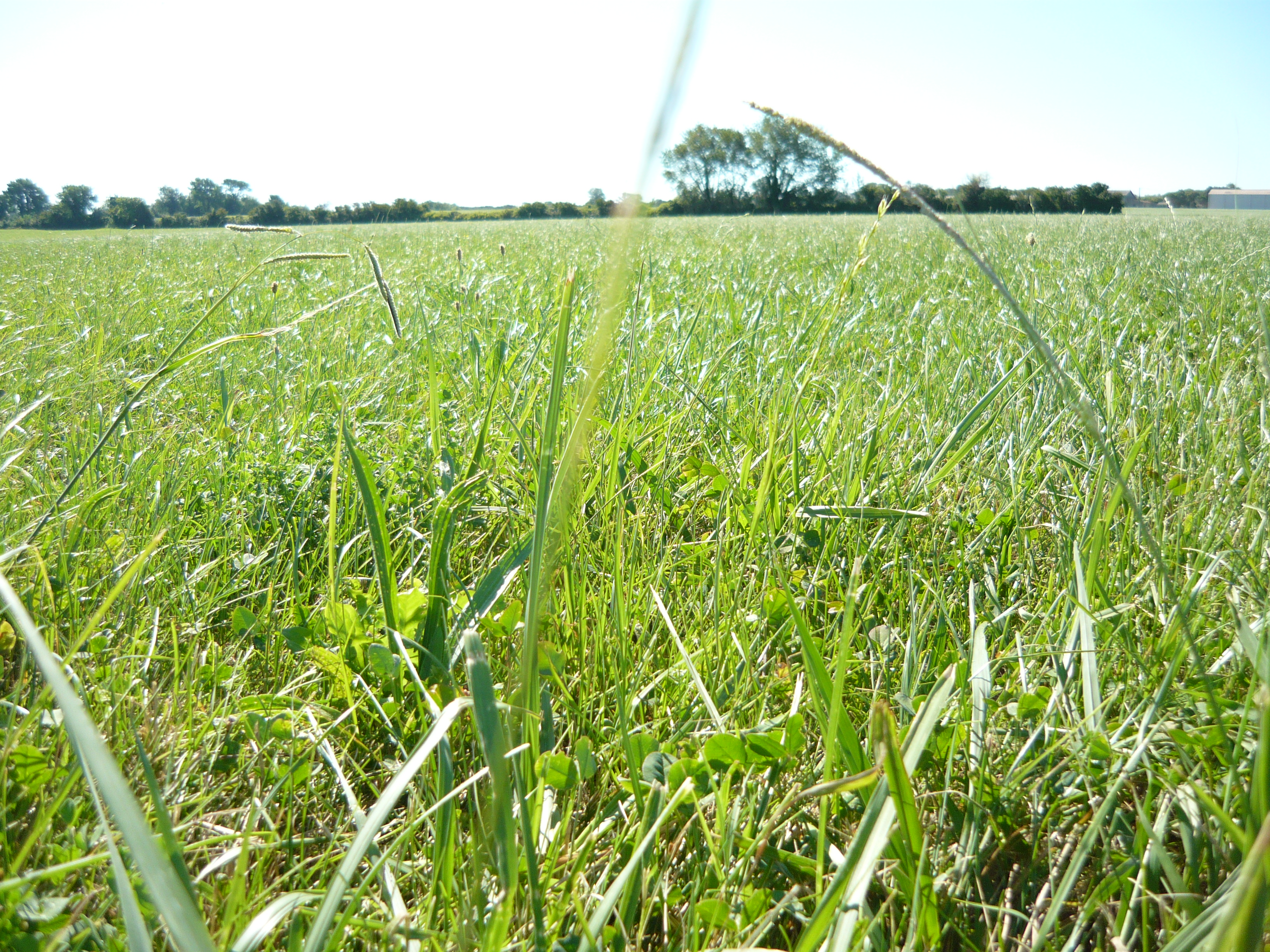
- Meadow used to produce Crau hay, in wet Crau.
- Type: Fodder
- Place of origin: Crau
- Region or state: Plaine de la Crau
- Associated cuisine: French cuisine
- Created by: Crau plain farmers
- Other information: AOC - AOP labeled https://www.foindecrau.com/

Foin de Crau or Crau hay is a French hay produced on the Crau plain in the Bouches-du-Rhône department, which has been awarded an AOC since 1997 and an PDO since 2015.

It's the first appellation d'origine for an agricultural product not intended for human consumption, and the only one in 2020. The bales, which can be identified by a red and white string, are available in a wide range of sizes, from small bundles (around 1kg) for domestic rodents to very large bundles (around 500kg) for large ruminant farms.

== Geographical zone ==
Geographical limits of the Crau plain.

Of the 52,000 ha of Crau, 12,000 ha are fertile meadows, thanks in part to irrigation.

9,000 hectares are covered by the AOC label.

== History ==
The first irrigation canal in the Crau was built in the 16th century by Adam de Craponne. Water from the Durance was thus drawn off and channeled to this plain, first to Salon-de-Provence, via Saint-Martin-de-Crau and then to Arles.

=== Contemporary period ===
A geographical area was defined by the breeders in 1941. A trademark was registered in 1948, and the AOC was obtained in 1997.

=== Production ===
Three successive cuts are made, spaced forty to seventy days apart. Their composition varies according to the cut. During autumn and winter, the meadows are grazed by sheep after their transhumance.

New meadows are created from alfalfa or a mixture of grasses and legumes, in a field that has been leveled and de-stoned. Irrigation water then allows other plants to appear spontaneously and naturally so that in just a few years they reach the equilibrium stage of natural meadows permanently. Manuring is essentially phospho-potassium.

Gravity watering is carried out by submersion: the meadow is flooded, but the water must not remain. It generally begins around March 15. Watering will follow one another on the same plot for a period of eight to ten days until the first heavy rains of autumn (September or October). They may be interrupted depending on rainfall or hay harvesting operations.

Hay is stored in bags or bales, tied with red and white string.

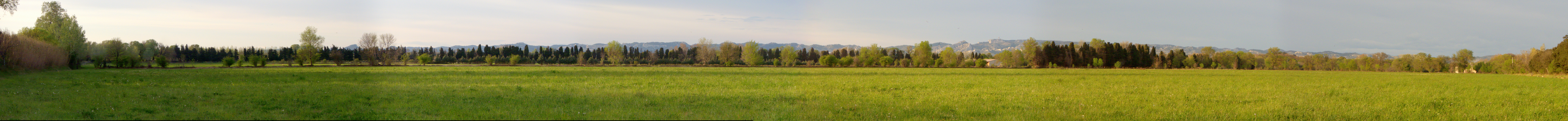
Hay meadow in the Crau.

=== Irrigation ===
Current irrigation practices are essentially gravity-fed. Grassland plots are bordered upstream by filioles (connected to the secondary network), which are made to overflow by clogging them with hammers. Submergence is progressive and lasts several hours. The volume of water supplied is in the region of 15,000 to 20,000 m³/ha/year. At the bottom of the land lot, there may be a drainage ditch to collect runoff water.

The main irrigators are Crau hay farmers, most often grouped into syndicated associations (ASA or ASL). Irrigation by submersion brings fertile silt to the meadows and also feeds the water table: 70% of the water in the water table comes from gravity-feed irrigation.

== Composition ==
Crau hay is composed of 30 to 50% grass (including fromental and orchardgrass), 25 to 35% legumes (including red clover and creeping clover), and 25 to 35% various grasses. Its floristic composition corresponds to a precise specification, established by Decree n°2015-1226, October 2, 2015, and by the Official Journal of the European Union dated January 31, 2017 of Implementing Regulation (EU) n°2017/15.

== Nutritional properties ==
It has a high protein and mineral content, particularly calcium.

== Natura 2000 ==
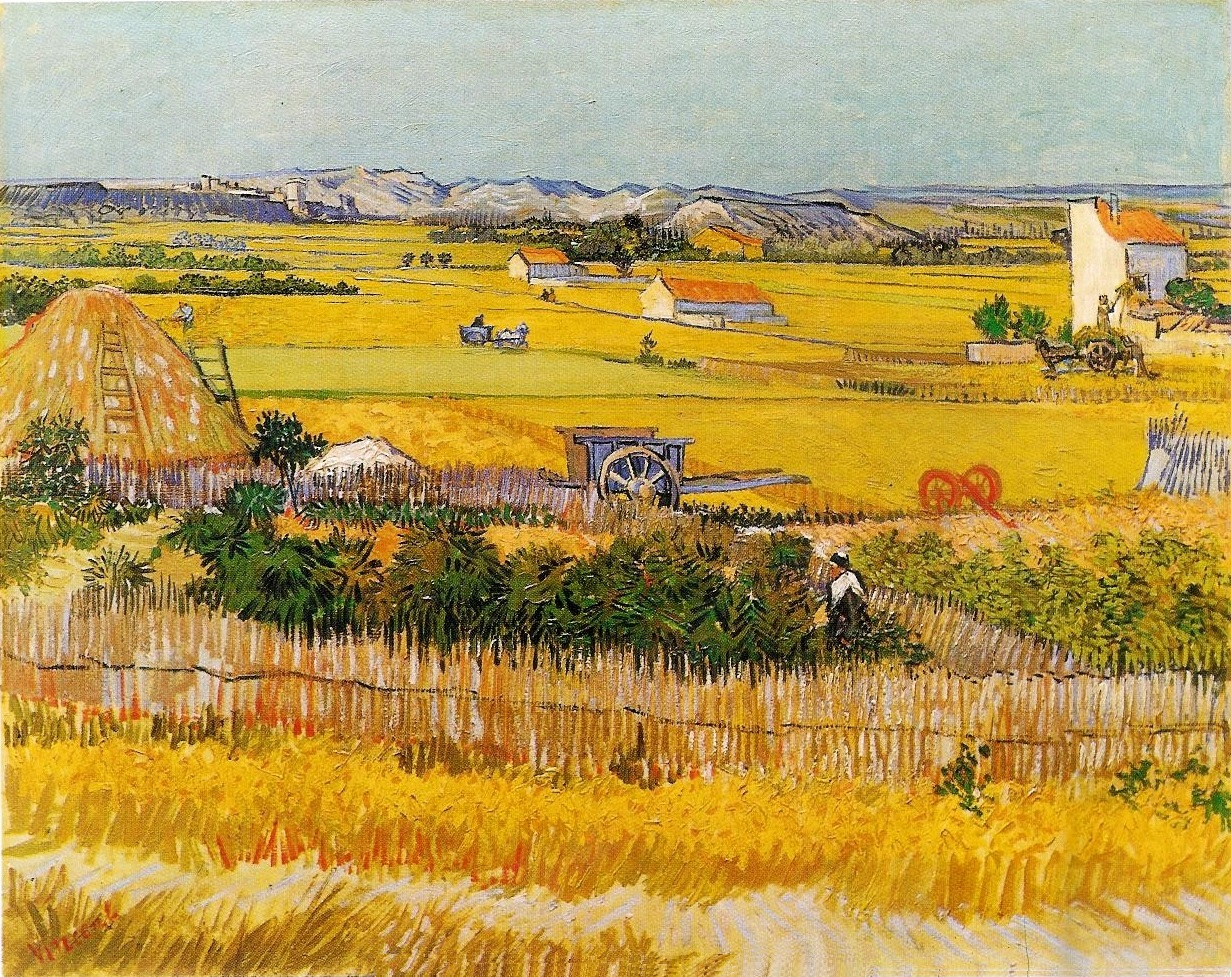
Harvesting in the Crau, with Montmajour in the background. Van Gogh, 1888.

Grasslands contribute to the overall balance of the Crau plain. To ensure their sustainability, it is therefore necessary to preserve this type of cultivation. That's why the committee has come out in favor of the Natura 2000 bill, which makes them part of a protected site in accordance with European directives for the protection of nature and flora. They are now involved in discussions and are key players in the drafting of regulations.

== Gastronomy and Crau hay ==
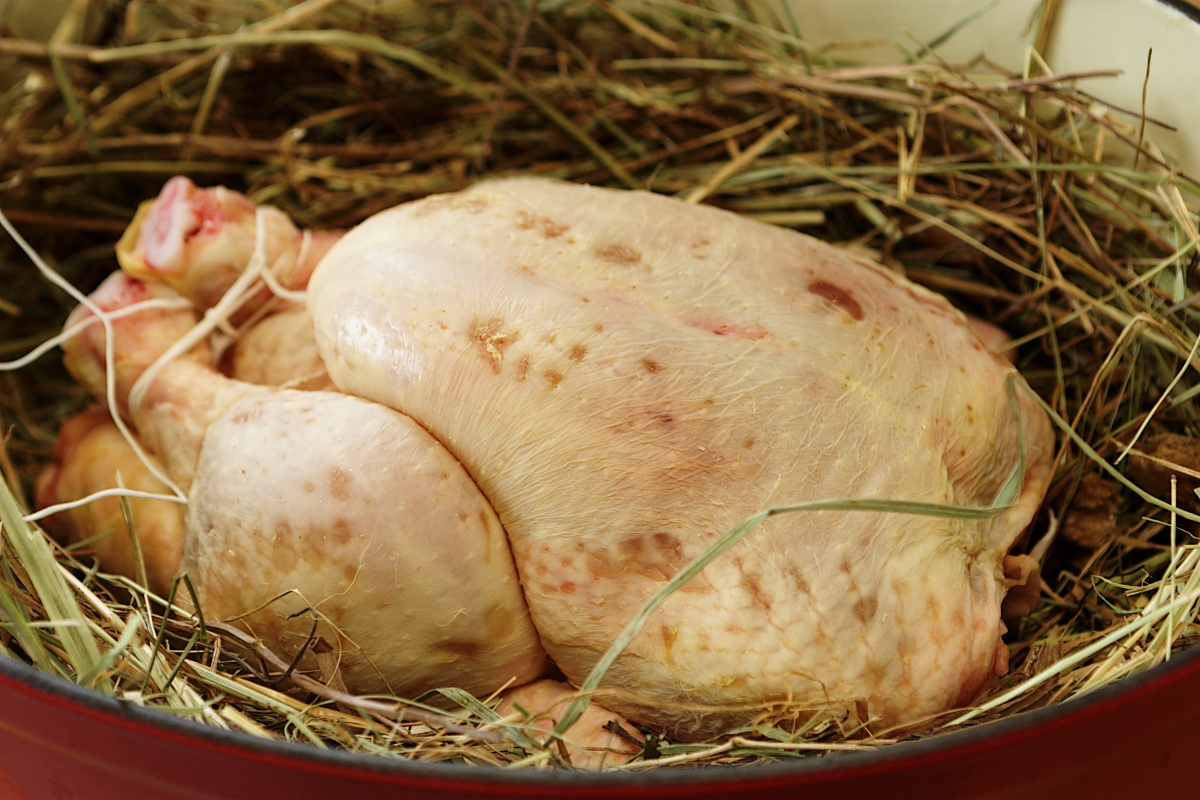
Chicken on Crau hay.

In 1986, Alain Passard bought the three-star L'Archestrate restaurant from his former mentor Alain Senderens, and renamed it L'Arpège. It was there that he began, that same year, to develop a hay chicken. Since then, he has been joined in this innovative approach by David Toutain (foie gras and eel brioches, smoked on hay), Marc Veyrat (hay glacé), Emmanuel Renaut (pigeon cooked on hay and juniper), Cyril Lignac (Lozère lamb with caramelized skin and Crau hay), and many others. This hay-based cuisine, sought after by chefs, gives dishes prepared in this way a smoky, vegetal flavor.

== See also ==
- Fin gras du Mézenc
- Appellation d'origine contrôlée
- Dactylis
