= Marwan al Shaqab =

Award-winning Arabian stallion

Marwan Al Shaqab is a 2000 bay Arabian stallion, bred and owned by Al Shaqab Stud.

== Titles Won ==
2001 World Arabian Horse Championships – Champion Colt

2001 Qatar International Arabian Championships – Champion Colt

2002 World Arabian Horse Championships – Champion Colt

2002 European Arabian Championships – Champion Colt

2002 All Nations Cup – Champion Colt

2003 US National Arabian Championships – Unanimous Champion Junior Stallion

2003 Region 9 Championships – Unanimous Champion Junior Stallion

2005 US National Arabian Championships – Unanimous Champion Junior Stallion

2007 World Arabian Horse Championships – Leading Sire

2008 World Arabian Horse Championships – Leading Sire

2008 World Arabian Horse Championships – Champion Senior Stallion

2008 All Nations Cup – Champion Stallion

2009 World Arabian Horse Championships – Leading Sire

2009 Qatar International Arabian Championships – Leading Sire

2009 Qatar International Arabian Championships – Champion Stallion

2010 World Arabian Horse Championships – Leading Sire

2010 Qatar International Arabian Championships – Leading Sire

2010 Qatar National Championships – Leading Sire

2010 Scottsdale Arabian Horse Show – Leading Halter Sire

2011 World Arabian Horse Championships – Leading Sire

2011 Mediterranean & Arab Countries Championships – Leading Sire

2011 Scottsdale Arabian Horse Show – Leading Halter Sire

2012 Mediterranean and Arab Countries Championships – Leading Sire

2012 Qatar International Arabian Horse Championships – Leading Sire

== Background ==
Marwan Al Shaqab is the son of stallion Gazal Al Shaqab (Anaza El Farid x Kajora by Kaborr), and out of Little Liza Fame (Fame VF x Katahza by Aza Destiny). He was foaled in February 12, 2000 in Doha/ Qatar, and was shown in 2001 as a yearling. He was leased to the Spanish breeder Marieta Salas of Ses Planes farm. During the spring of 2002 the two-year-old stallion was bred to 10 mares at Ses Planes, resulting in 9 foals by him born in 2003. In May 2002, he was shown in the Nations Cup, the European Championship and the World Championship, he was named Jr. Champion at each and therefore also won the informal European "Arabian Triple Crown". He then returned to the United States, where he stood at trainer Michael Byatt’s facility in Houston, Texas. Handled by Byatt, Marwan Al Shaqab became 2003 U.S. Jr. National Champion Stallion; a title he would win again in 2005.

Sire of many world champion sons: Baanderos, QR Marc, Kahil Al Shaqab, Wadee Al Shaqab, Abha Qatar, Marajj, Heir of Marwan and daughter: Najdah Al Zobair.

Height: 1.60M

Registration No: 599438

Bloodlines: Arabian/Polish/American Domestic

== See also ==
- Pianissima
