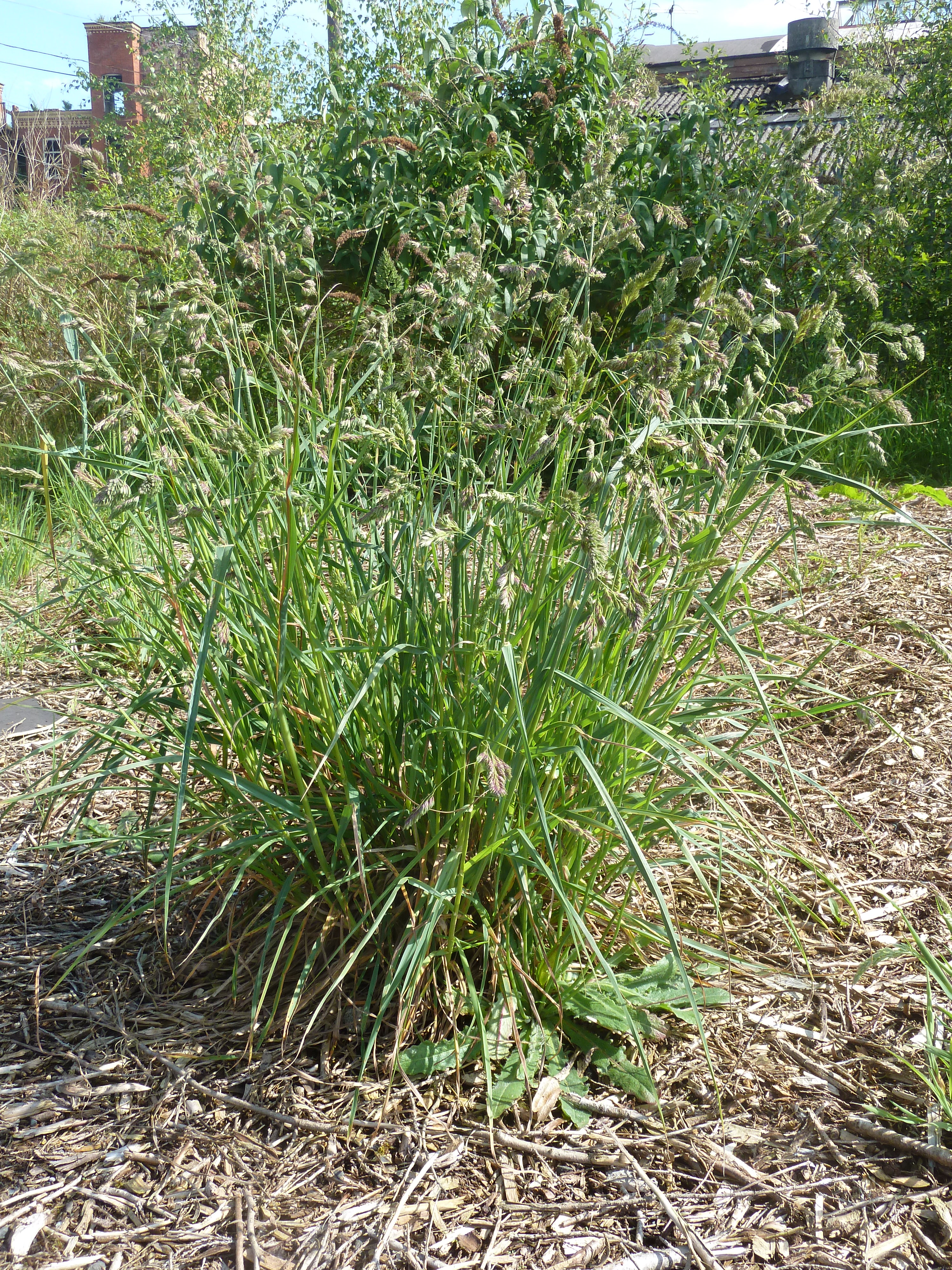
- Dactylis glomerata subsp. glomerata, Ireland

Scientific classification
- Kingdom: Plantae
- Clade: Embryophytes
- Clade: Tracheophytes
- Clade: Angiosperms
- Clade: Monocots
- Clade: Commelinids
- Order: Poales
- Family: Poaceae
- Subfamily: Pooideae
- Genus: Dactylis
- Species: D. glomerata

Binomial name
- Dactylis glomerata L. (1753)

Subspecies
- 20; see text

Synonyms
- Bromus glomeratus (L.) Scop. (1771); Festuca glomerata (L.) All. (1785); Koeleria dactylis Chaub. (1838); Limnetis glomerata (L.) Eaton (1817); Phalaris glomerata (L.) Gueldenst. (1791); Trachypoa vulgaris Bubani (1901), nom. superfl.

= Dactylis glomerata =

Species of grass

Dactylis glomerata is a species of flowering plant in the grass family Poaceae, commonly known as barnyard grass, cocksfoot grass, cockspur, orchard grass, or cat grass (due to its popularity for use with domestic cats). It is a cool-season perennial C_{3} tufted grass native throughout most of Europe, temperate Asia, and northern Africa.

== Distribution ==
Dactylis glomerata occurs from sea level in the north of its range, to as high as 4,000 metres in elevation in the south of its range in Pakistan. It is widely used for hay and forage.

It is a principal species in the widespread National Vegetation Classification habitat community MG1 (Arrhenatherum elatius grassland) in the United Kingdom, and so can be found with Arrhenatherum elatius (false oat grass).

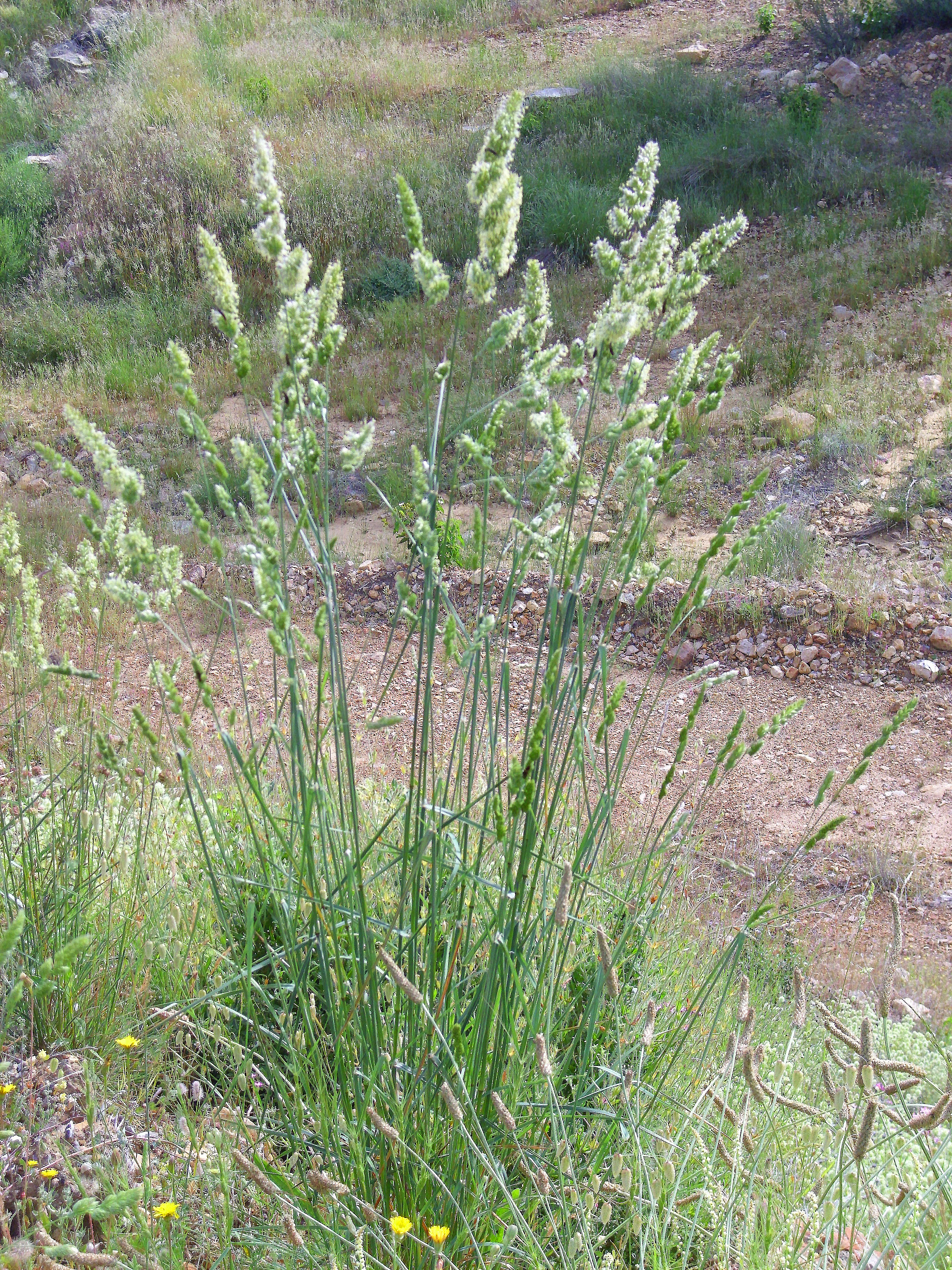
Dactylis glomerata subsp. hispanica, Sierra Madrona, Spain

It can be found in meadows, pasture, roadsides, and rough grassland.

It has been introduced into North America, New Zealand and Australia, and is now widely naturalised. In some areas, it has become an invasive species.

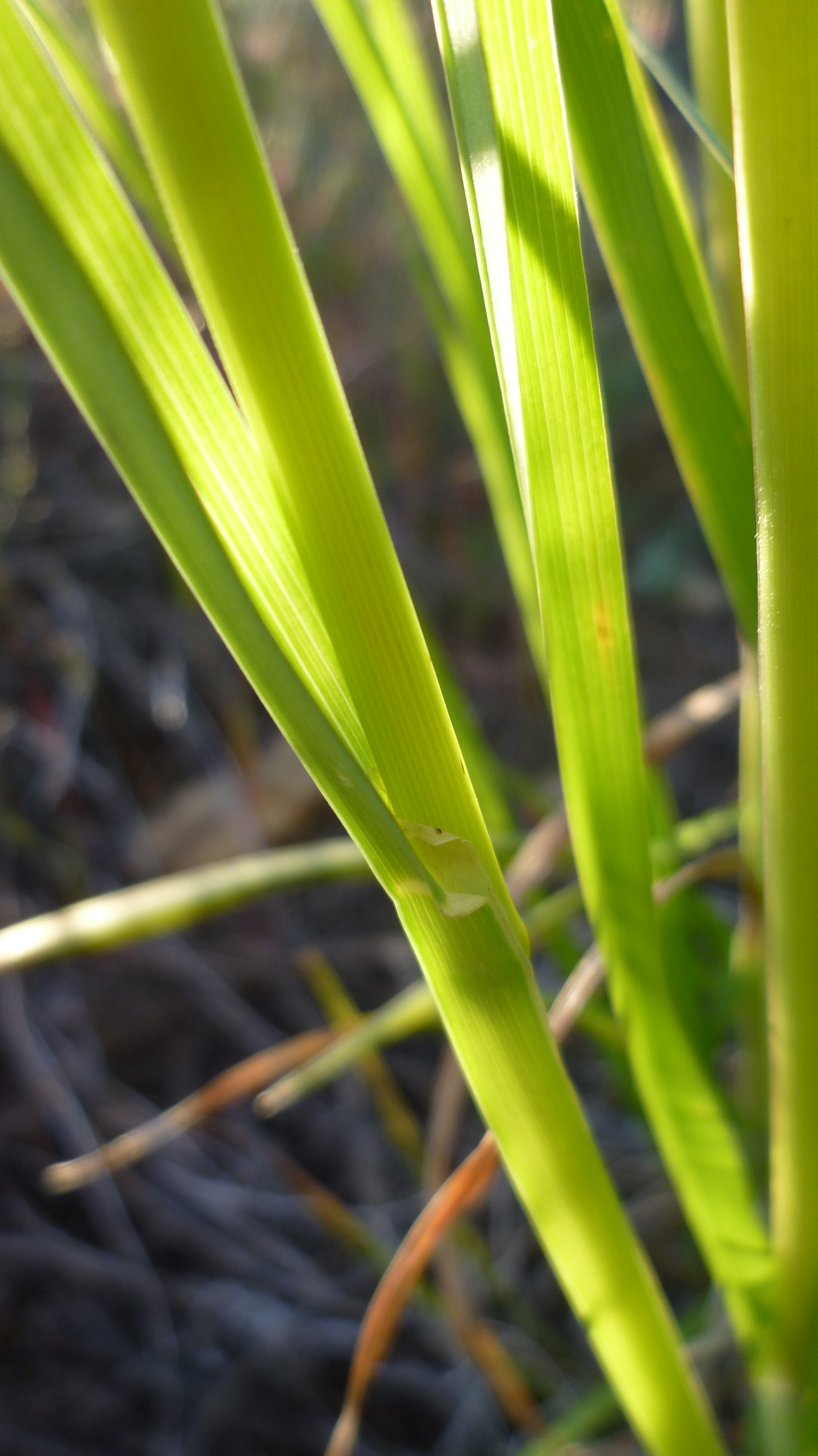
One of the keys to distinguishing this species from other grasses are its flat stems

== Description ==
Cock's-foot grows in dense perennial tussocks to 20–140 centimetres (7.9–55.1 in; 0.66–4.59 ft) tall, with grey-green leaves 20–50 centimetres (7.9–19.7 in; 0.66–1.64 ft) long and up to 1.5 centimetres (0.59 in) broad, and a distinctive tufted triangular flowerhead 10–50 centimetres (3.9–19.7 in; 0.33–1.64 ft) long, which may be either green or red- to purple-tinged (usually green in shade, redder in full sun), turning pale grey-brown at seed maturity. The spikelets are 5–9 millimetres (0.20–0.35 in) long, typically containing two to five flowers. It has a characteristic flattened stem base which distinguishes it from many other grasses.

It flowers from June to September.

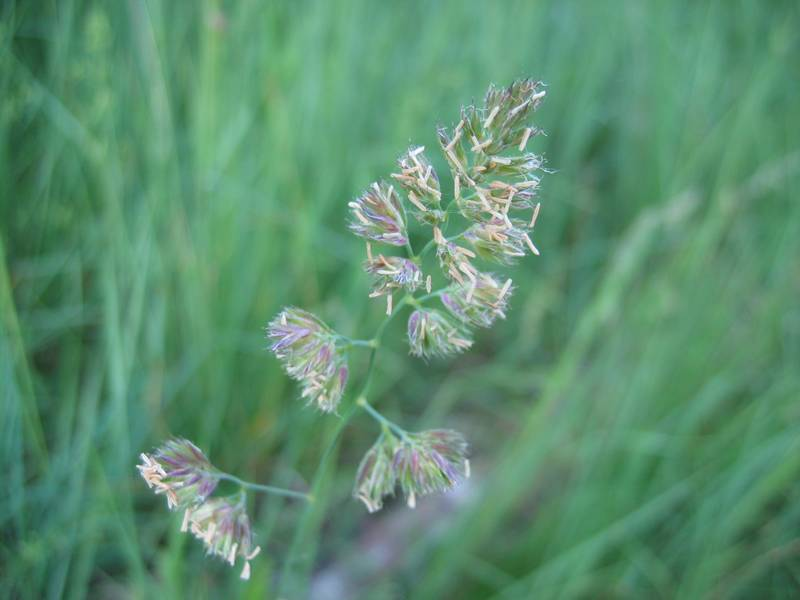
Flower head

== Taxonomy ==
Dactylis glomerata is treated as the sole species in the genus Dactylis by some authors, while others include one to four other species. It is commonly divided into several regional subspecies, particularly by those authors accepting only the single species. Plants of the World Online accepts 20 subspecies.

- Dactylis glomerata subsp. glomerata (synonyms subsp. altaica and subsp. himalayensis) – widespread; described from Europe
- Dactylis glomerata subsp. hackelii (Asch. & Graebn.) Cif. & Giacom. (syns. subsp. marina, D. marina Borrill, and D. maritima (Hack.) Rivas Mart.) – Mediterranean and Madeira
- Dactylis glomerata subsp. hispanica (Roth) Nyman (syn. D. hispanica Roth) – Mediterranean and western Asia to Afghanistan
- Dactylis glomerata subsp. hyrcana Tzvelev (syn. D. hyrcana) – eastern Transcaucasus
- Dactylis glomerata nothosubsp. intercedens (Domin) Acedo (D. glomerata subsp. glomerata × D. glomerata; syns. subsp. lobata and D. × intercedens Domin) – Germany and Czechoslovakia
- Dactylis glomerata subsp. izcoi S.Ortiz & Rodr.Oubiña (syn. D. izcoi Horjales, Laso & Redondo) – Portugal and western Spain
- Dactylis glomerata subsp. judaica Stebbins & D.Zohary – Israel
- Dactylis glomerata subsp. juncinella (Bory) Stebbins & D.Zohary (syn. D. juncinella Bory – southern Spain (Sierra Nevada) and Morocco
- Dactylis glomerata subsp. lobata (Drejer) H.Lindb. (syns. D. lobata (Drejer) Ostenf., subsp. aschersoniana, D. aschersoniana Graebn., D. polygamaHorv., and D. scabra W.Mann ex Opiz) – western and central Europe to the Caucasus
- Dactylis glomerata subsp. lusitanica Stebbins & D.Zohary – northwestern Spain to central Portugal
- Dactylis glomerata subsp. mairei Stebbins & D.Zohary – northeastern Algeria
- Dactylis glomerata subsp. merinoana (Horjales, Laso & Redondo) H.Scholz – Iberian Peninsula
- Dactylis glomerata subsp. nestorii Rosselló & L.Sáez (syns. subsp. ibizensis, D. ibizensis Gand.) – Balearic Islands (Ibiza and Formentera)
- Dactylis glomerata subsp. oceanica G.Guignard – western and northwestern France
- Dactylis glomerata subsp. reichenbachii (Dalla Torre & Sarnth.) Stebbins & D.Zohary – Alps (Austria, France, Italy)
- Dactylis glomerata subsp. rigida (Boiss. & Heldr.) Hayek (syn. D. rigida Boiss. & Heldr.) – Crete
- Dactylis glomerata subsp. santai Stebbins & D.Zohary – northern Algeria and Tunisia
- Dactylis glomerata subsp. slovenica (Domin) Domin (syn. D. slovenica Domin) – Alps, Carpathians, and northern Balkan Peninsula
- Dactylis glomerata subsp. stebbinsii (Horjales, Laso & Redondo) H.Scholz – southern Spain
- Dactylis glomerata subsp. woronowii (Ovcz.) Stebbins & D.Zohary (syn. D. woronowii Ovcz.) – Caucasus

Dactylis glomerata subsp. glomerata and subsp. hispanica are tetraploid forms with 28 chromosomes; some of the other subspecies, including subsp. himalayensis and subsp. lobata are diploid, with 2n = 14. Hexaploid forms with 42 chromosomes are also known, but rare. Tetraploid forms are larger and coarser than diploid forms.

== Cultivation and uses ==
Cock's-foot is widely used as a hay grass and for pastures because of its high yields and sugar content, which makes it sweeter than most other temperate grasses. In dry areas as in much of Australia, Mediterranean subspecies such as subsp. hispanica are preferred for their greater drought tolerance. It requires careful grazing management; if it is undergrazed it becomes coarse and unpalatable.

In some areas to which it has been introduced, cock's-foot has become an invasive weed, notably some areas of the eastern United States.

As with other grasses, the pollen can cause allergic rhinitis (hay fever) in some people.

The grass is popularly grown to satisfy the craving of domestic cats to chew grass, hence its colloquial name cat grass.

The seeds were first collected by Rogers Parker in Hertfordshire; this was then developed by the agricultural reformer Coke of Norfolk. Parker's estate, Munden, near Bricket Wood, was inherited by the botanist George Hibbert.

== Butterfly foodplant ==
The caterpillars of many butterfly species feed on cock's foot, including:

- Meadow brown (Maniola jurtina)
- Wall brown (Lasiommata megera)
- Gatekeeper (Pyronia tithonus)
- Large skipper (Ochlodes venata)
- Essex skipper (Thymelicus lineola)
- Small skipper (Thymelicus sylvestris)
- Zabulon skipper (Poanes zabulon)
- Speckled wood (Pararge aegeria)

== Popular culture ==
Doom metal band Candlemass named their 1998 studio album after the Dactylis glomerata.
