= Whitestone =

Whitestone may refer to:

== Places ==
- Whitestone, Alaska, an unincorporated community
- Whitestone, Devon, a village in the United Kingdom
- Whitestone, Ontario, a township in Canada and a community within the township
- Whitestone, Queens, a neighborhood in New York City
- Whitestone, Warwickshire, a suburb of Nuneaton, a town in the United Kingdom
- Whitestone, a statistical area surrounding Te Anau in New Zealand

== People ==
- Annabelle Whitestone (born 1946), English concert manager
- Frank Whitestone, creator of lobby group nthellworld
- Heather Whitestone (born 1973), beauty queen and conservative activist
- Henry Whitestone (1819–1893), Irish architect in Louisville, Kentucky

== Other uses ==
- Whitestone FM, later Port FM, a local radio station in Timaru, New Zealand
- Whitestone (album), a 1985 album by jazz guitarist Joe Pass
- Whitestone Bank, a sand bank off the Isle of Man
- Whitestone Branch, a branch of the Long Island Rail Road in New York City
- Whitestone Cheese, a company in Oamaru, New Zealand
- Whitestone Expressway, part of Interstate 678 in New York City
- Whitestone Park, a sports ground in Peebles, Scotland
- Whitestone River, a tributary of the Mararoa River in New Zealand
- Whitestone School, an independent school in Bulawayo, Zimbabwe
- Whitestone, a fictional city-state in the Dungeons & Dragons web series Critical Role

== See also ==
- Whitstone (disambiguation)
- White Stone (disambiguation)
- Mount Whitestone, Queensland, a locality in the Lockyer valley
- White Stone, Virginia, a town in Lancaster County
- Whitestone Village, Yukon, a community in Canada
