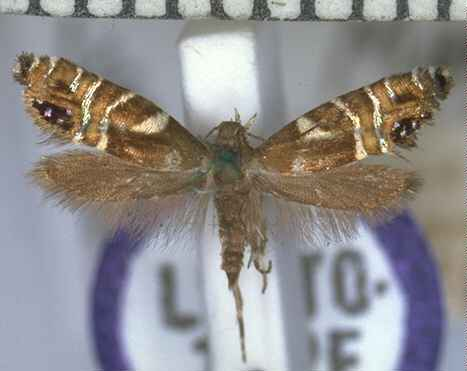

Scientific classification
- Kingdom: Animalia
- Phylum: Arthropoda
- Clade: Pancrustacea
- Class: Insecta
- Order: Lepidoptera
- Family: Glyphipterigidae
- Genus: Glyphipterix
- Species: G. acronoma

Binomial name
- Glyphipterix acronoma Meyrick, 1888

Synonyms
- Glyphipteryx acronoma Meyrick, 1888

= Glyphipterix acronoma =

Species of moth endemic to New Zealand

Glyphipterix acronoma is a species of sedge moth in the genus Glyphipterix. It is endemic to New Zealand and is found in the North and South Islands. Its preferred habitat is open fields on mountain sides and adults are on the wing in December and January.

== Taxonomy ==
This species was first described in 1888 by Edward Meyrick under the name Glyphipteryx acronoma. Meyrick used two specimens collected in January at approximately 4000 ft up Mount Arthur to describe the species. George Hudson also used this name when describing and illustrating this species in 1928. In 1986 the genus Glyphipteryx was judged an unjustified emendation of Glyphipterix Hübner so this species is now known as Glyphipterix acronoma.

The lectotype specimen is held at the Natural History Museum, London.

== Description ==
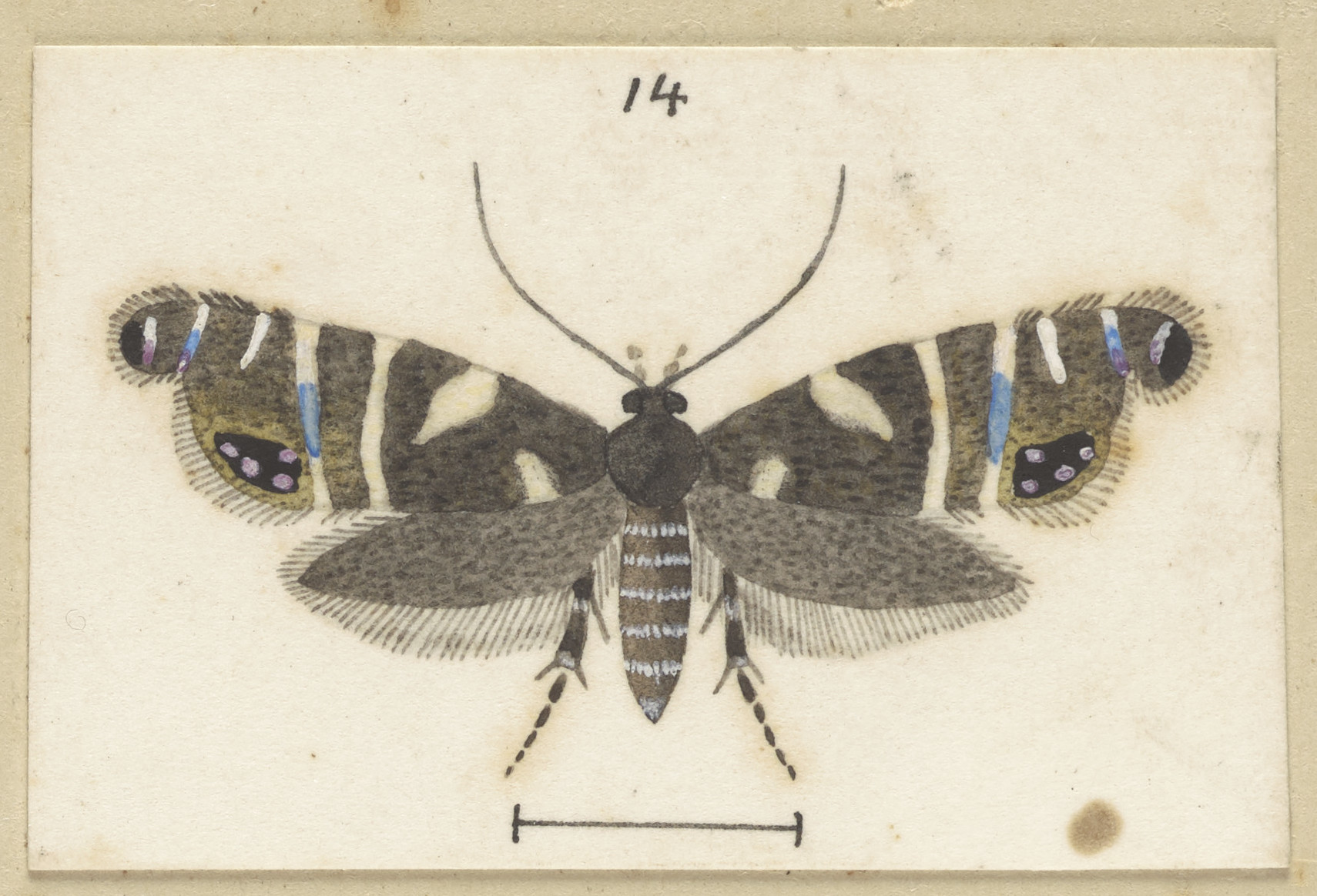
Illustration by George Hudson

Meyrick described this species as follows:

Male, female. — 10-11 mm. Head and thorax deep greyish-bronze, thorax with a small posterior white spot. Palpi white, second joint with four black bands, terminal joint black in front. Antennae and abdomen dark fuscous. Legs dark fuscous, ringed with whitish. Forewings elongate, costa gently arched, apex round-pointed, hindmargin sinuate, oblique; rather deep greyish-bronze, posterior half mixed with light bronzy-ochreous; an ochreous-white oblique streak from costa at 1/3, broadest in middle, apex acute, reaching half across wing; a slender white slightly curved fascia from middle of costa to inner margin beyond middle, sometimes indistinct in disc, forming a small spot on inner margin; a silvery-blue-metallic slightly curved slender fascia from 2/3 of costa to 3/4 of inner margin, becoming white at extremities; three short silvery-blue-metallic streaks from costa between this and apex, forming white dots on costa, last margining a round black apical spot; a subtriangular black anal patch, containing four round violet-golden-metallic spots : cilia grey, with a blackish line near base, interrupted by a triangular white indentation above middle. Hindwings dark grey; cilia grey.

Alfred Philpott studied the maxillae parts of lepidoptera including this species and stated that the genus to which this species belongs had palp that were three or four segmented and were smaller than other genera studied.

== Distribution ==
G. acronoma is endemic to New Zealand. As well as the type locality of Mount Arthur, this species has been found at Waimarino and Gollan's Valley in Wellington both in the North Island, as well as in Fiordland, near the Mararoa River in Southland, and in the Queenstown Lakes District, all in the South Island.

== Lifecycle and behaviour ==
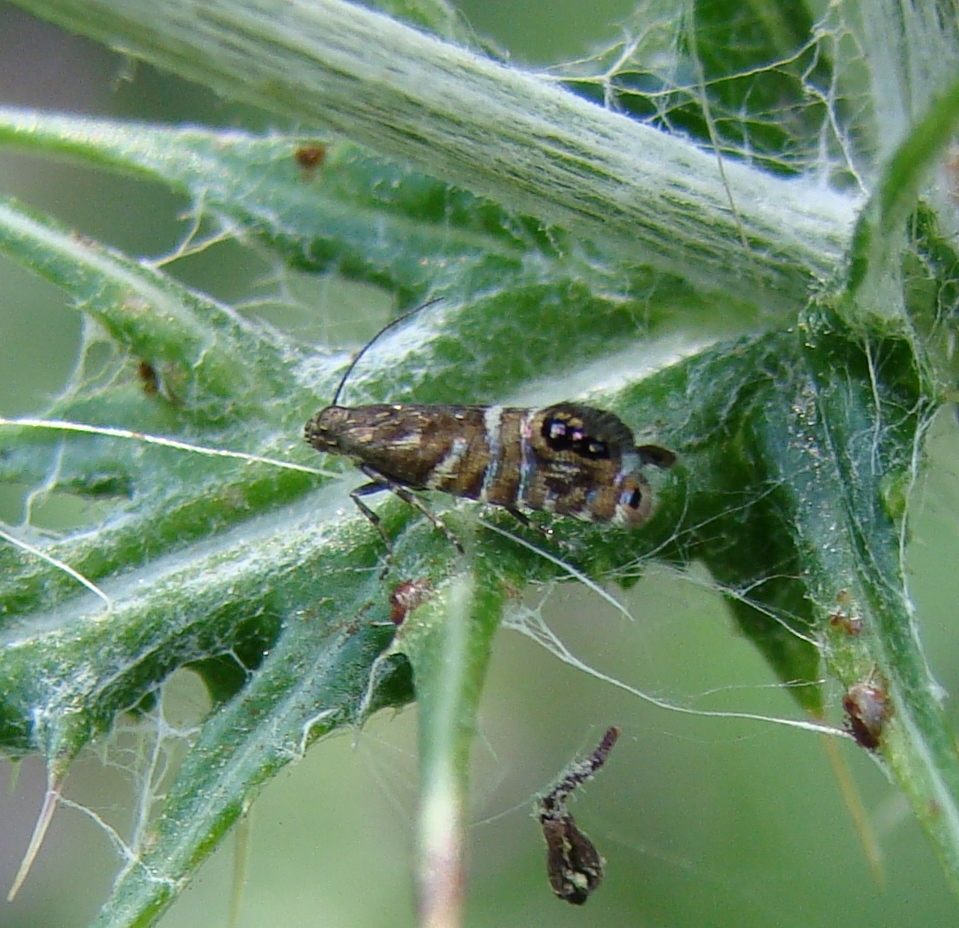

This species is on the wing in December and January.

== Habitat ==
The preferred habitat of this species is open fields on mountain sides.
