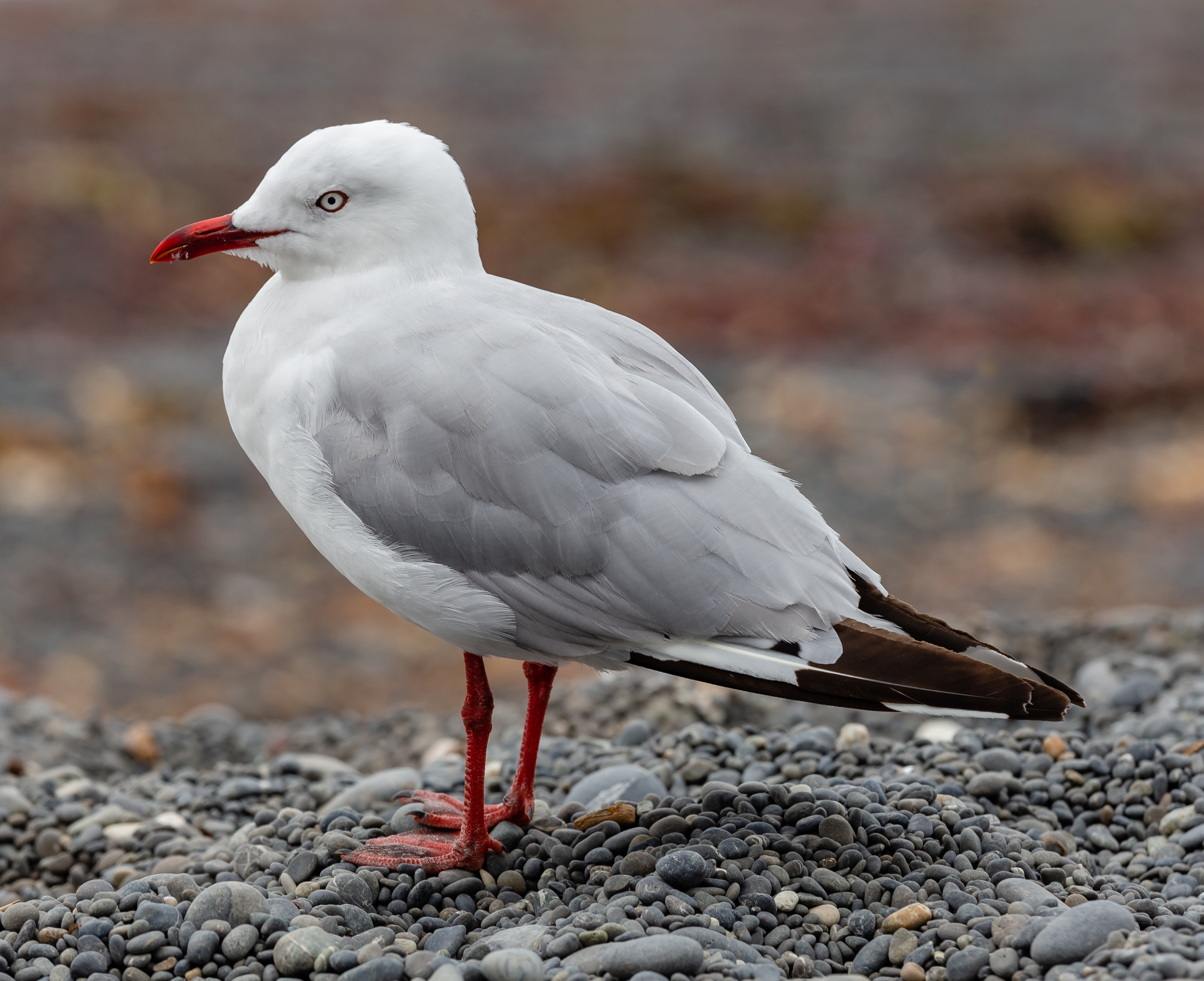
- An adult gull in Kaikōura, New Zealand
- Declining (NZ TCS)

Scientific classification
- Kingdom: Animalia
- Phylum: Chordata
- Class: Aves
- Order: Charadriiformes
- Family: Laridae
- Genus: Chroicocephalus
- Species: C. novaehollandiae
- Subspecies: C. n. scopulinus

Trinomial name
- Chroicocephalus novaehollandiae scopulinus (Forster, 1844 (Note: Published posthumously in Descriptiones animalium, p. 106))

Synonyms
- Larus novaehollandiae scopulinus, Larus scopulinus

= Red-billed gull =

Subspecies of bird, native of New Zealand

The red-billed gull (Chroicocephalus novaehollandiae scopulinus), also known as tarāpunga and as the mackerel gull, is a native seagull of New Zealand, found throughout the country and on outlying islands including the Chatham Islands and subantarctic islands. It was formerly considered a separate species but is now usually treated as a subspecies of the silver gull (Chroicocephalus novaehollandiae).

The Māori name of this species is tarāpunga or akiaki. Its vernacular name is sometimes also used for the dolphin gull, a somewhat similar-looking but unrelated species that is found in coastal southern Chile, Argentina and the Falkland Islands. As is the case with many gulls, the red-billed gull was traditionally placed in the genus Larus.

A national survey of breeding red-billed gulls carried out in 2014–2016 recorded 27,831 pairs nesting in New Zealand. The authors of a study published in 2018 and based on the survey said that the accuracy of previous estimates was questionable, but that the species nevertheless appeared to have declined nationally since the mid-1960s. The study also discussed the possible reasons for the decline and made a proposal for future monitoring. Under the New Zealand Threat Classification System, the status of the red-billed gull changed from 'not threatened' in 2002 to 'nationally vulnerable' in 2016. The red-billed gull is a protected species under the Wildlife Act 1953. Penalties for disturbing or harming the birds include a fine of $100,000 and/or two years' imprisonment.

== Description ==
The red-billed gull is the smallest gull commonly seen in New Zealand. It is about 37cm long, with an all-red bill, red eye ring, red legs and feet, and pale grey wings with black wingtips. The rest of the body and the tail are white. Males are on average slightly heavier than females, but there is virtually no visual difference between the male and female birds. Juvenile gulls have a dark brown bill with only hints of red, making them difficult to distinguish from the black-billed gull. The legs of juveniles are also brown and there are brown spots on the grey wings.

The red-billed gull was formerly considered a distinct species, but is now considered to be a subspecies of the similar-looking silver gull found in Australia.

== Population and distribution ==
Red-billed gulls breed in about 80 colonies on New Zealand's North and South Islands (mostly on the east coast of both islands), on offshore islands and in the Chatham Islands. Many birds fly several hundred kilometres between their breeding colony, which they return to each year, and sites where they spend the winter. Most birds stay within 400km of their breeding colony. There are also several inland breeding colonies at Sulphur Point at Lake Rotorua, which increased in size between the 1990s and 2010. Māori history recalls that in 1823, Te Arawa people living on Mokoia Island in Lake Rotorua were attacked by the Ngāpuhi tribe. The Te Arawa people were warned of the attack when a flock of red- and black-billed gulls disturbed by the attackers flew up, squawking an alert. After the battle, Te Arawa honoured the gulls by declaring them tapu or sacred.

The national population of red-billed gulls increased between the 1930s and 1970. A 1965 analysis estimated that at that time there was a national breeding population of 40,000 pairs of birds, but numbers have declined since then. In 2014–2016, Birds New Zealand and the Department of Conservation carried out a national survey of red-billed gull breeding colonies and found an estimated 27,831 breeding pairs. The three largest colonies used to be at Three Kings Islands (35 km north of the North Island), the Mokohinau Islands (100 km northeast of Auckland in the Hauraki Gulf) and Kaikōura on the east coast of the South Island. A 1934 report of an expedition to the Three Kings group stated that there were "tens of thousands" of red-billed gulls on the water which flew into the air as the expedition's ship approached: "There were literally acres of these birds on the sea feeding on small fish, and, as they rose off the water, the air was filled with white birds like a great snowstorm." At Mokohinau, an expedition in November 1933 observed thousands of nesting red-billed gulls.

The colonies at Three Kings Islands and Mokohinau have declined by more than 80 per cent since the 1990s, for reasons yet unknown: by 2016, there were only 1763 breeding pairs at the Three Kings Islands, and 58 at Mokohinau. The 2014–2016 study found that the largest mainland colonies were at Kaikōura (3210), Taiaroa Head (2145), Rotorua (2277) and Marsden Point (1190). The only large colonies on off-shore islands were at the Three Kings Islands (1763 pairs) and Stephens Island (1250 pairs).

As of 2026, New Zealand's biggest red-billed gull colony is on the Kaikōura peninsula. In the 1950s there were two breeding areas at Kaikōura. By the late 1960s this had increased to ten colonies spread out around the north and south of the Kaikōura Peninsula, but by the 2000s only two colonies remained. From 1964 to 2018, Department of Conservation scientist Jim Mills monitored the gulls at Kaikōura during the breeding season from October to January. Over 55 years he counted, weighed, measured and tagged 76,285 birds at the colony, creating comprehensive records that became one of the largest avian databases in the world. Mills found that the population at Kaikōura halved between 1983 and 2003 and the birds became smaller and lighter. Part of the decrease was blamed on predation of chicks by feral cats.

Several factors may be contributing to population decline. Since the 1970s, marine discharge of offal and sewerage has significantly declined, thus removing a winter food source for the gulls. El Niño currents or climate change cause a decrease in krill that the gulls need, and malnourished birds are more vulnerable to predators, parasites and infections. Colonies at Marsden Point oil refinery, Tauranga Harbour timber wharf, Sanford’s slipway at St Mary’s Bay, Auckland, and the roof of The Hub shopping complex at Whakatāne indicate that human settlement and industrial development have not been a barrier to establishment of a breeding colony, but it is not known how successful these colonies are. The birds living in these environments are probably eating food scraps left by humans.

In contrast to the national trend of population decline, red-billed gull colonies in Otago have increased steadily since 1992. The increase in red-billed gulls at Taiaroa Head is due to predator control at the albatross colony there.

== Behaviour ==
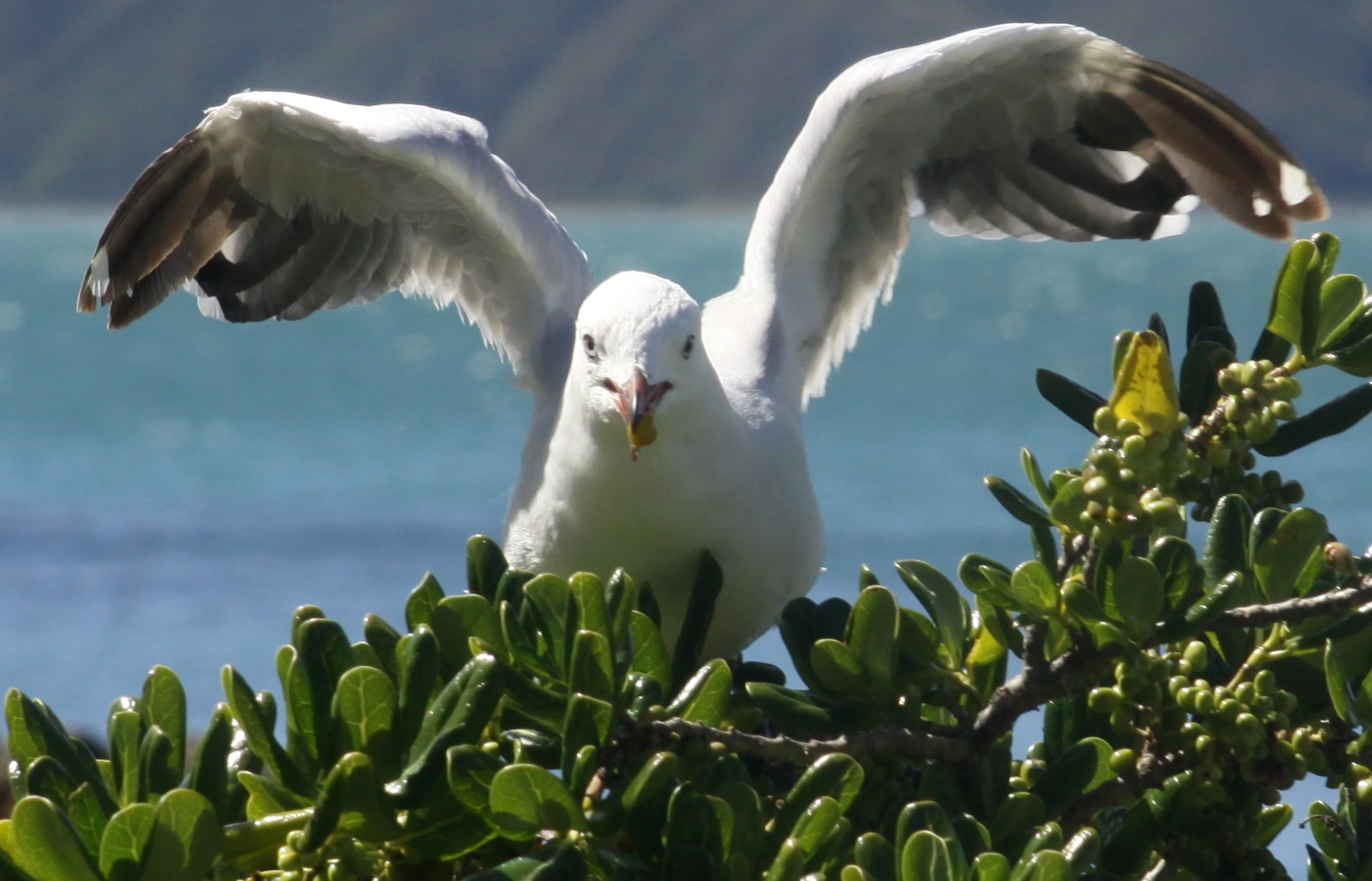
Eating taupata berries

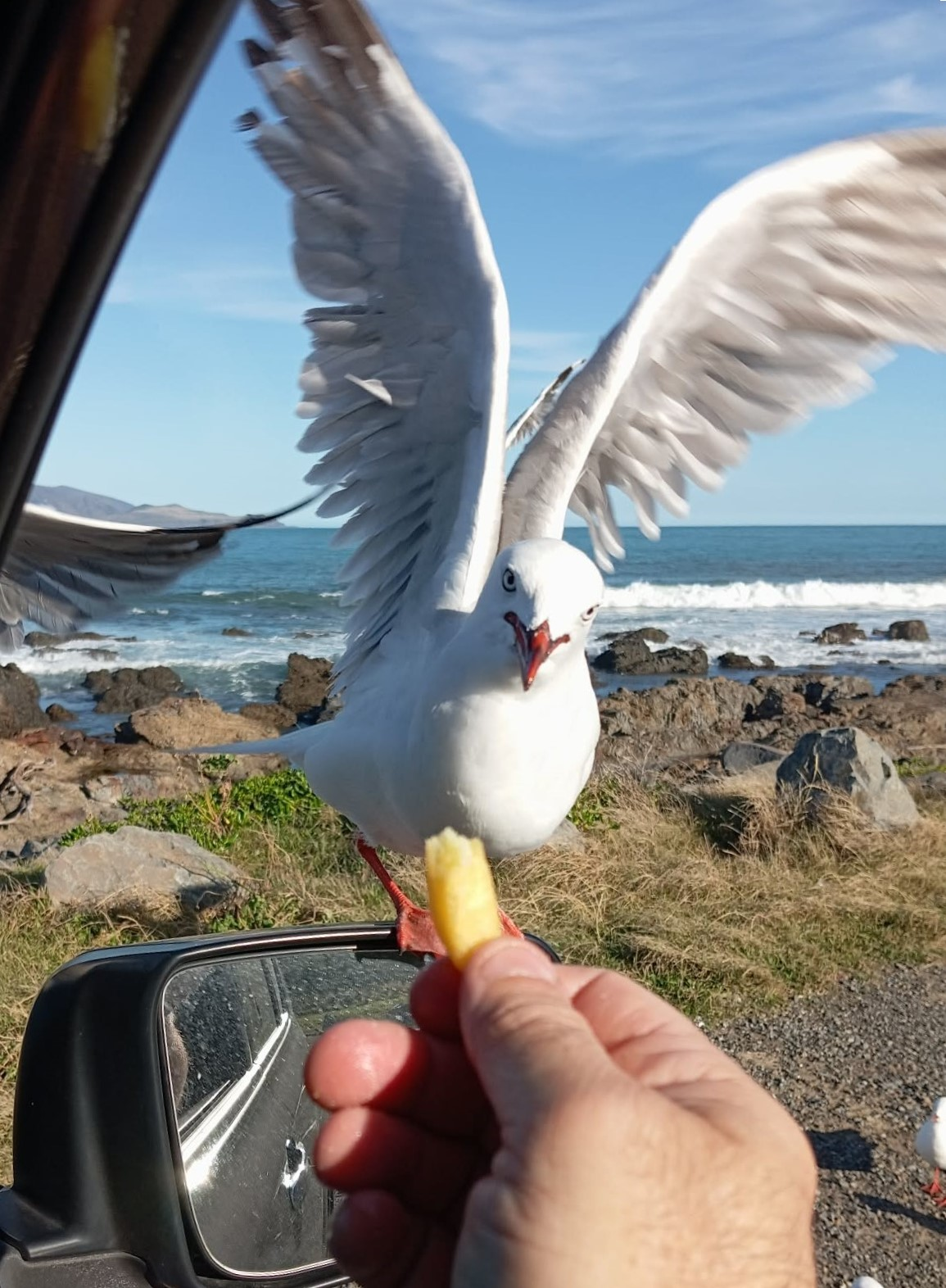
Demanding hot chips

Behaviourally, the red-billed gull is a typical gull. It is an aggressive scavenger and kleptoparasite. Its numbers increased after European settlement, especially around coastal towns and cities where it could scavenge from urban waste, but the population is now declining. The red-billed gull is a non-diving seabird: it only feeds on food sources on the surface of the sea. It may travel 20km or more each day between roosting sites and feeding areas at sea. The red-billed gull normally feeds on krill, marine invertebrates, small fish and shellfish and sometimes eats lizards, insects, seeds and berries. It has been reported to engage in worm charming in order to bring prey to the surface. The red-billed gull is known for enjoying hot chips, although this is not a natural food. In bad weather the red-billed gull will move inland to feed on worms in wet fields. Courtship feeding is an important part of the preparation for mating.

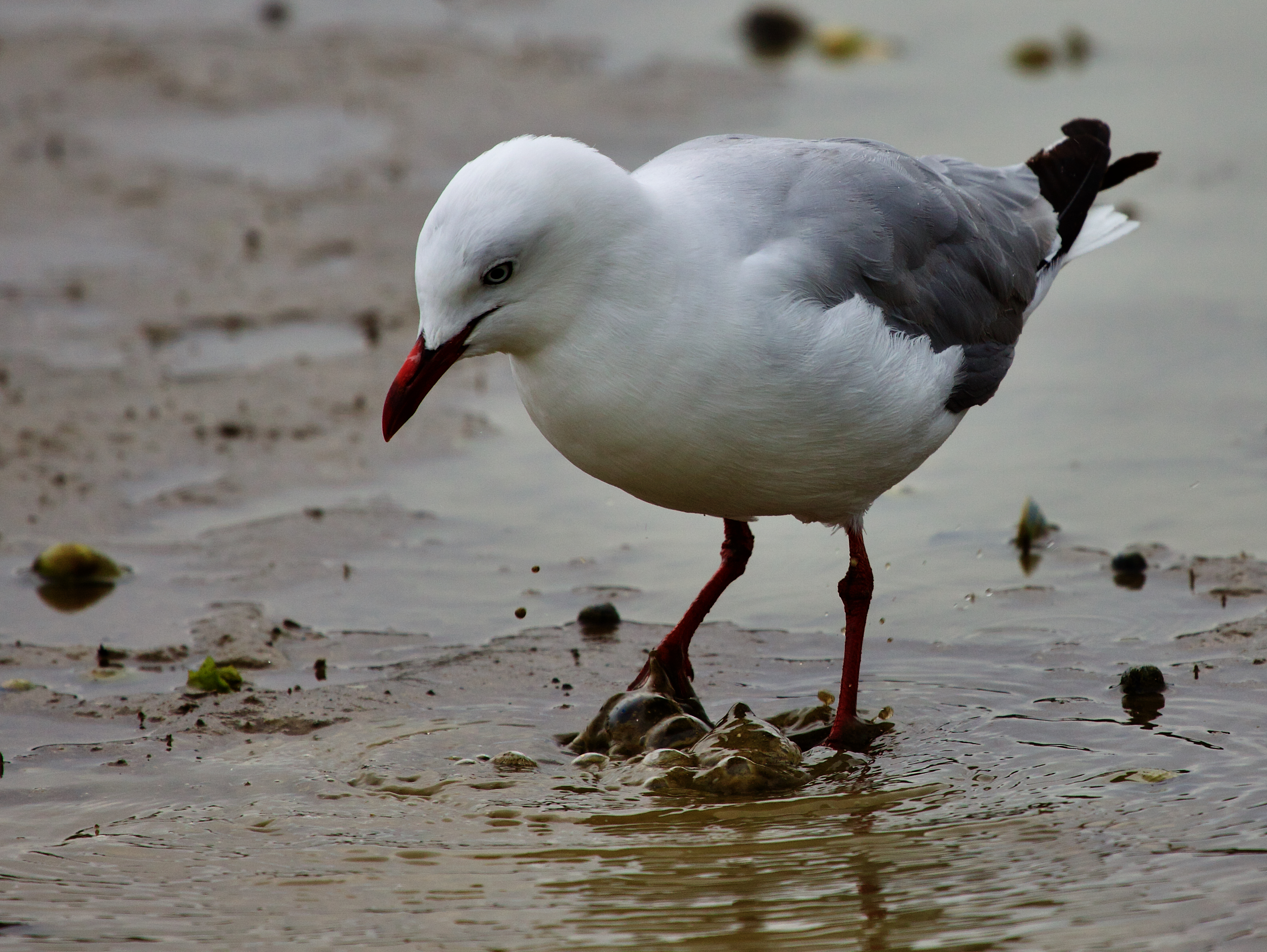
Foraging by oscillating its foot in sand at low tide to uncover prey

== Life cycle ==
They lay eggs from October to December in large colonies on the coast, on islands, rocky headlands, cliffs or gravel beaches. The birds form pair bonds which endure across seasons, but there is a certain amount of extra-pair copulation. Nests are well formed and may be constructed of seaweed, grasses, leaves and ice plants. Generally two to three eggs are laid. Their colour ranges from brown to grey with light and dark brown spots all over. The bird generally lives up to 12 years, although individuals have also been found living up to 30 years.

== Gallery ==
Red-billed gull

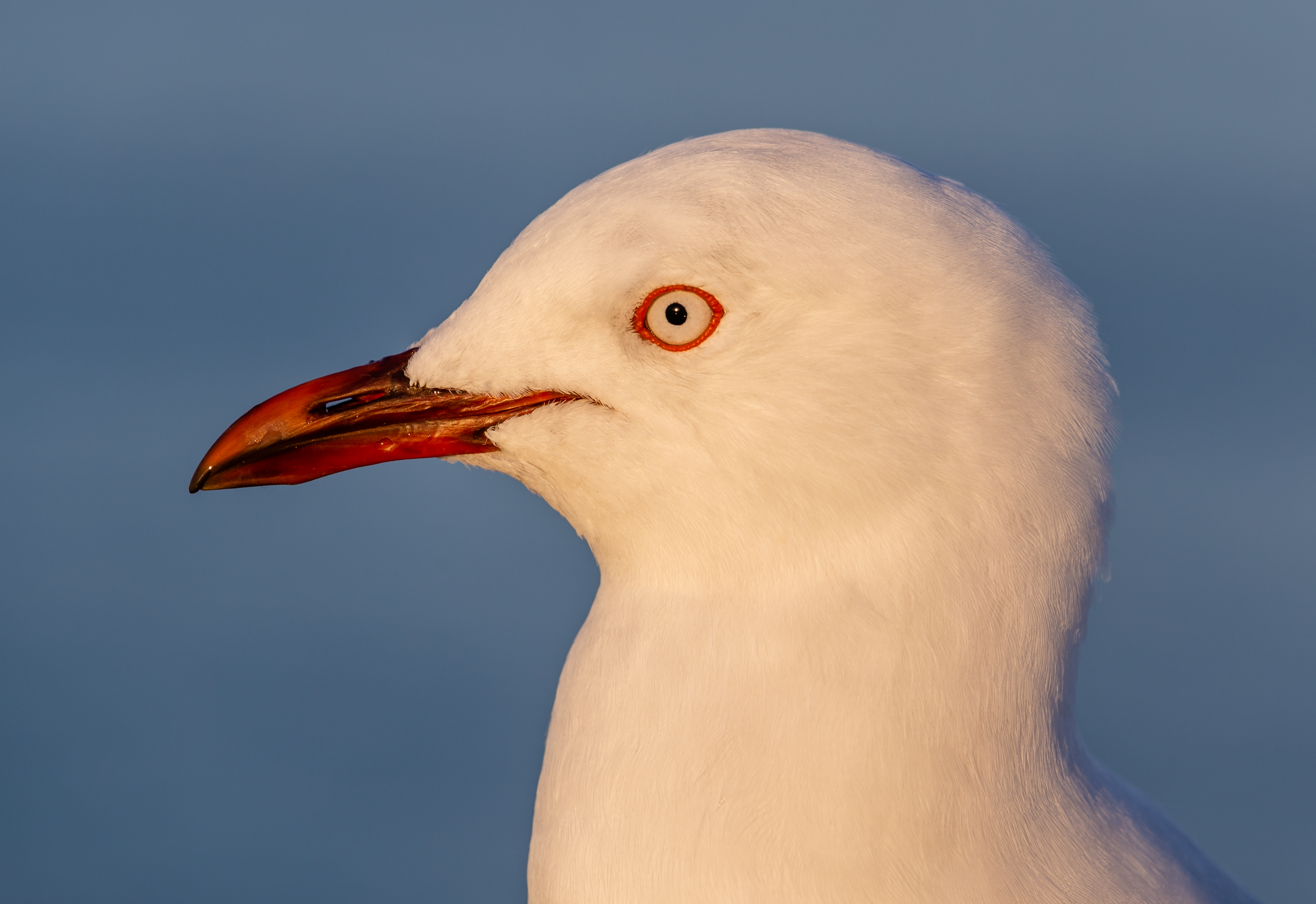
Upper body

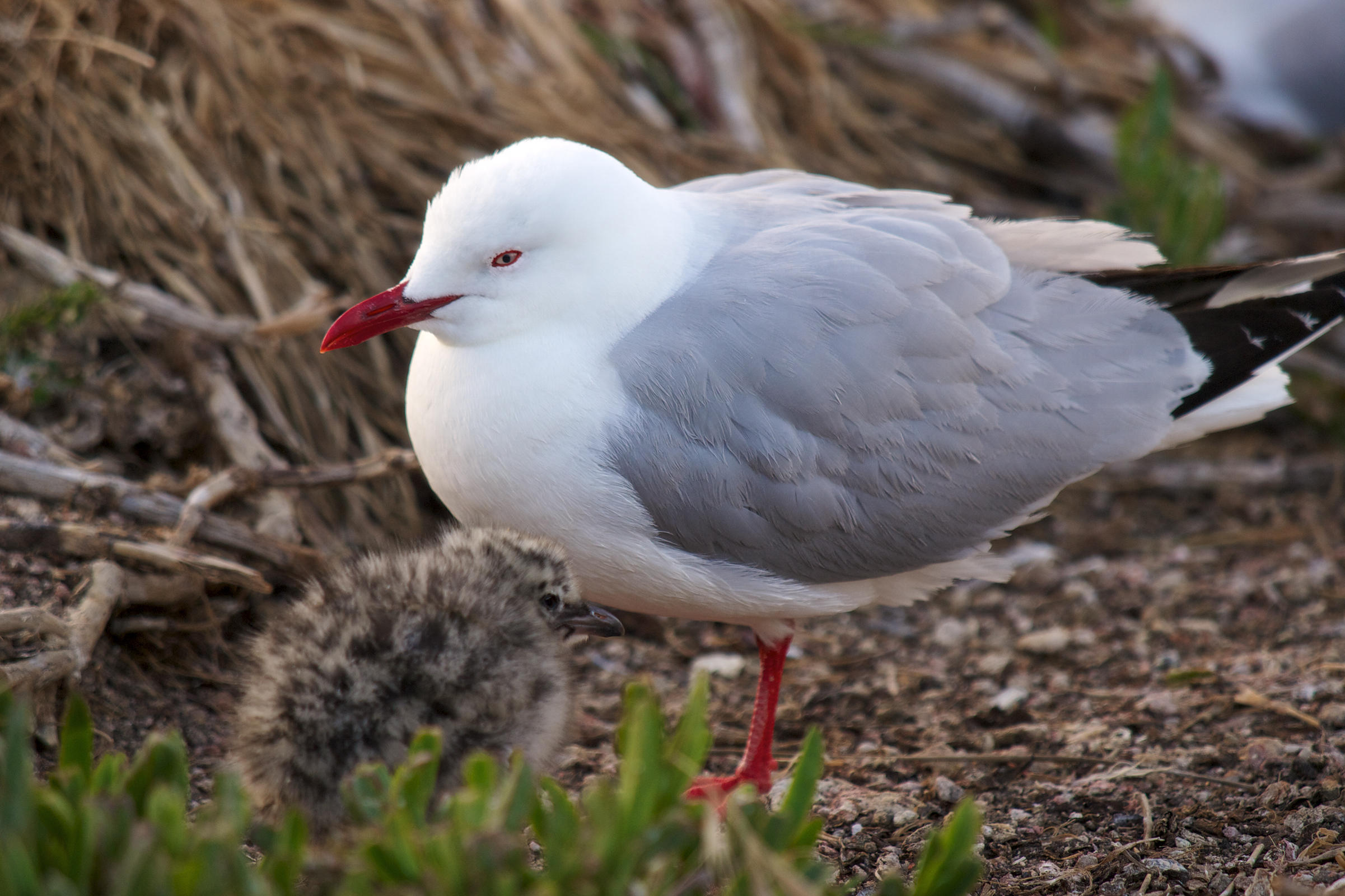
Adult with chick

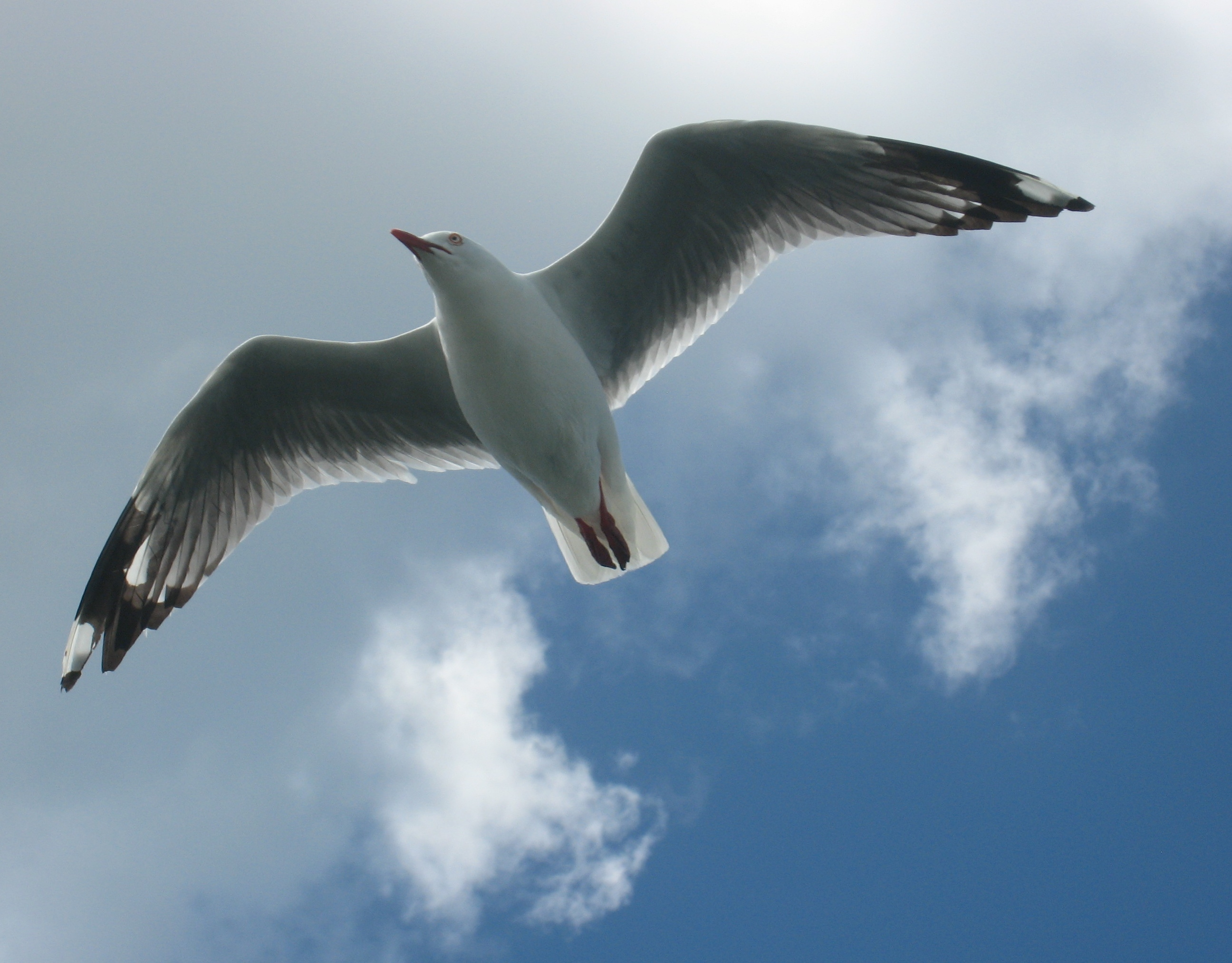
Red-billed gull in flight

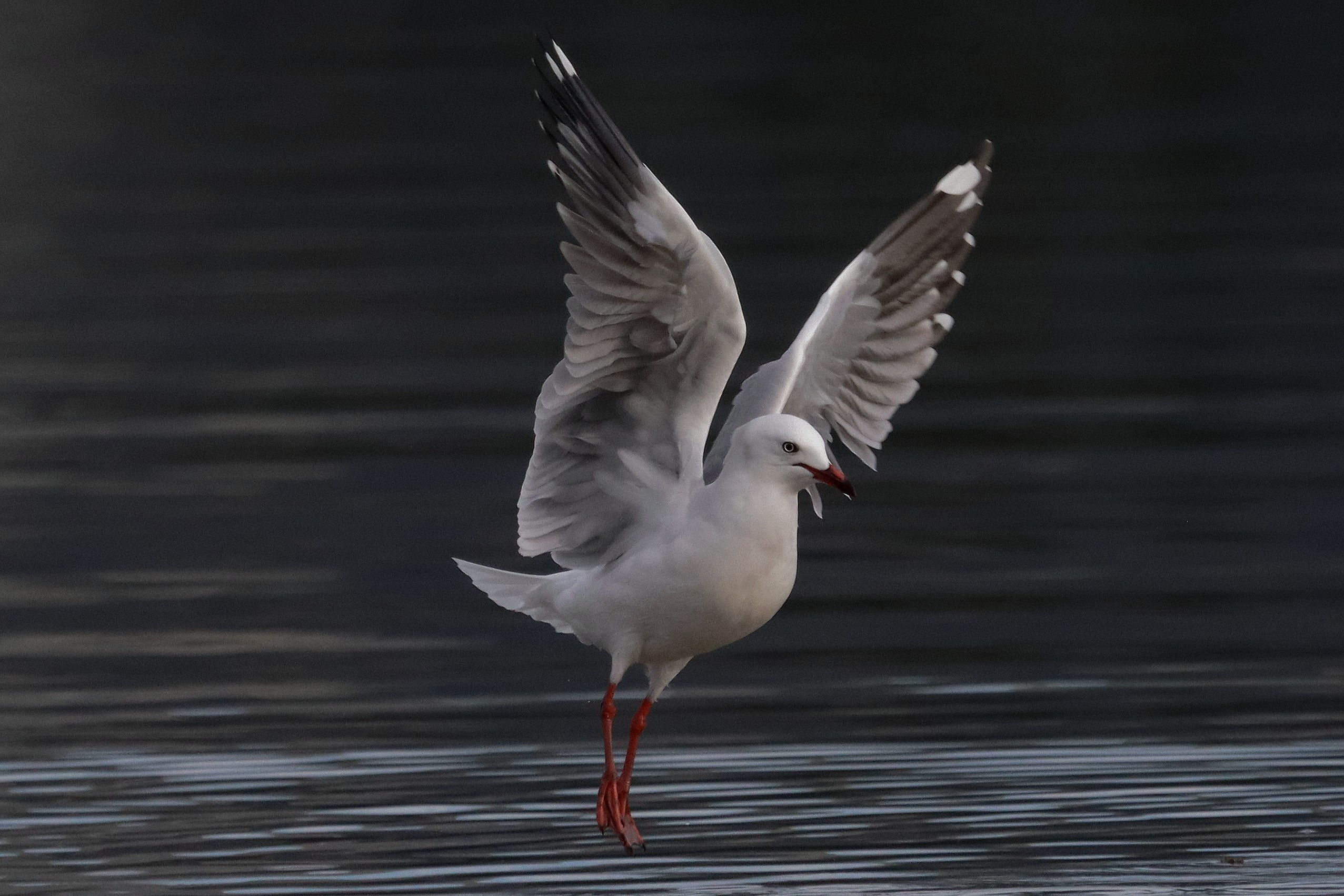
Landing

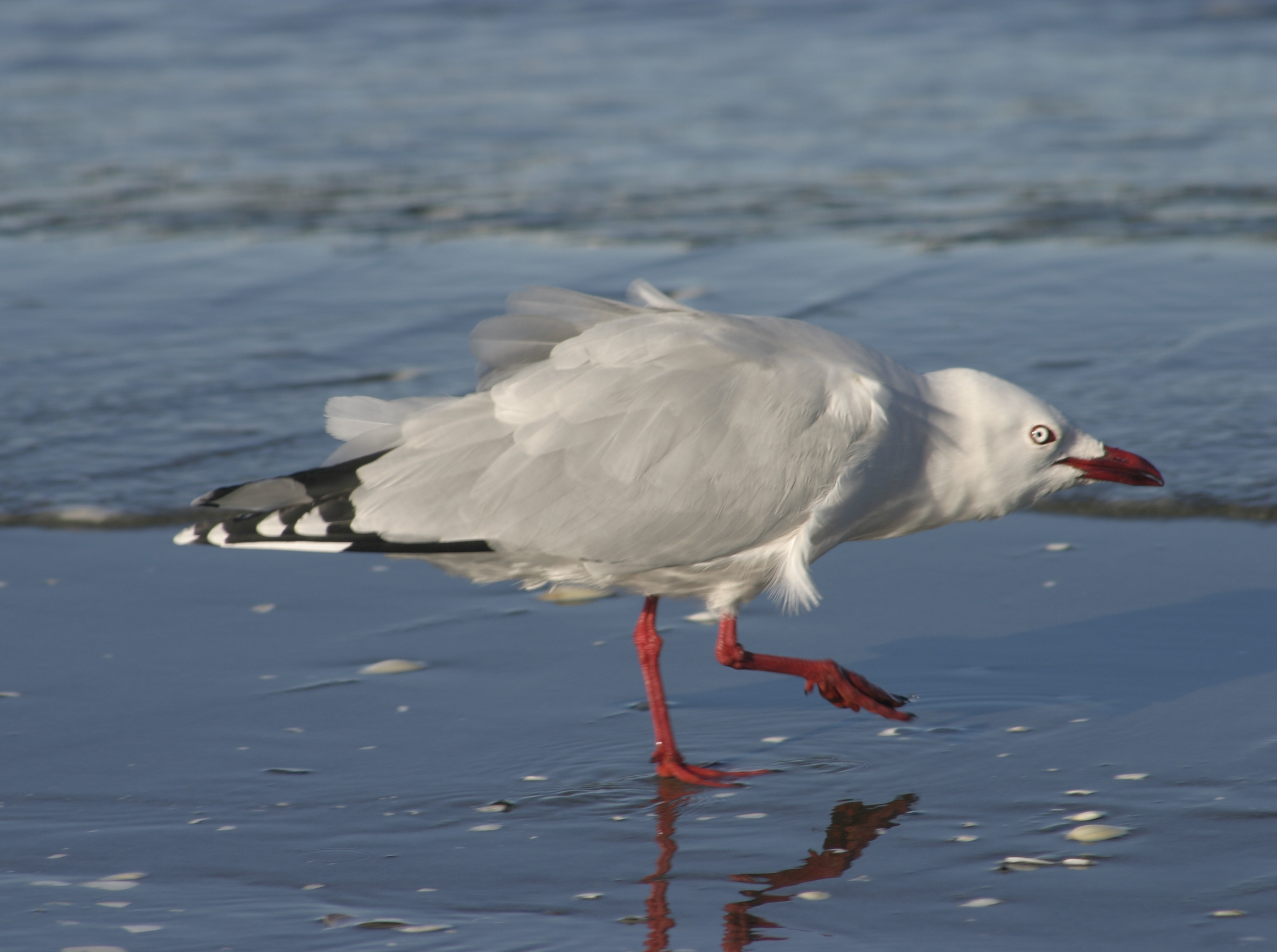
Crouching

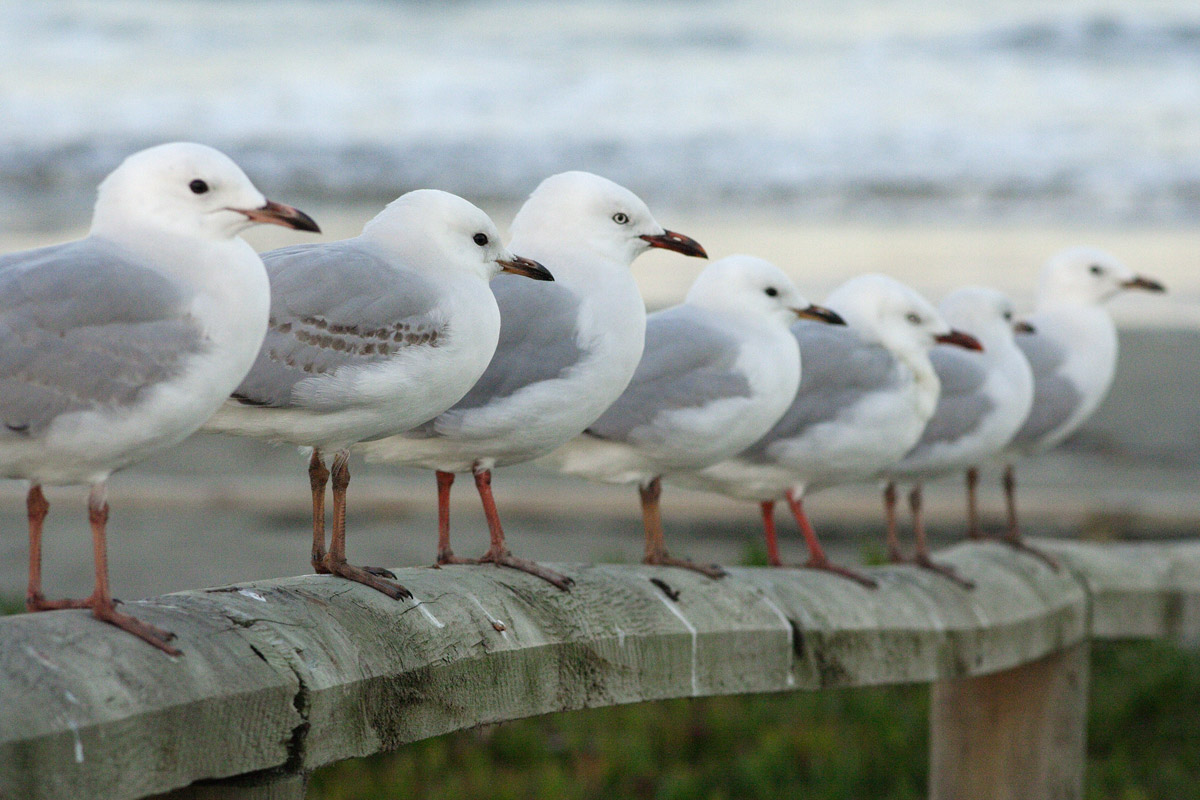
Second-winter, first-winter, and adult birds (first three, from front)

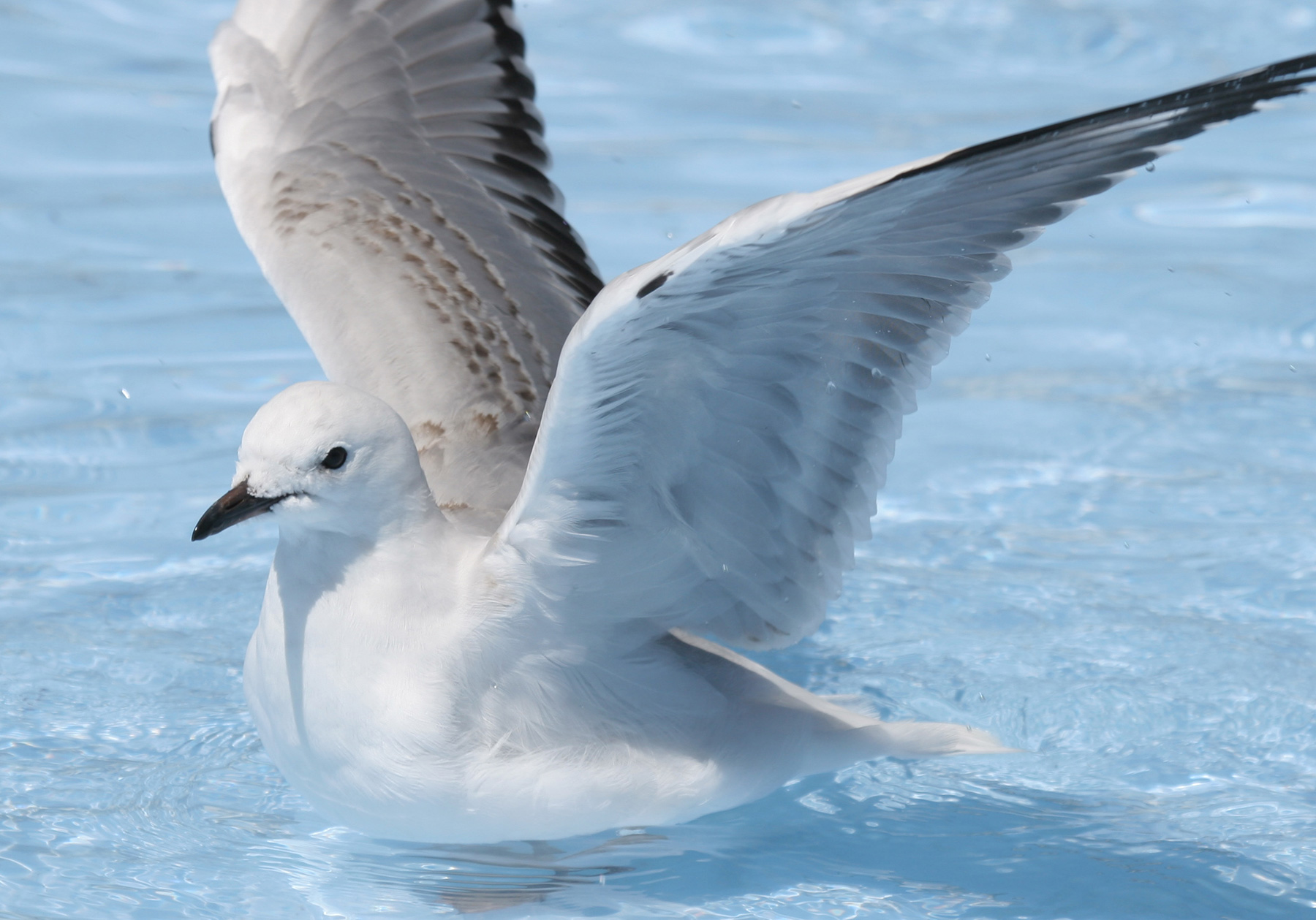
Juvenile bathing, Picton, New Zealand

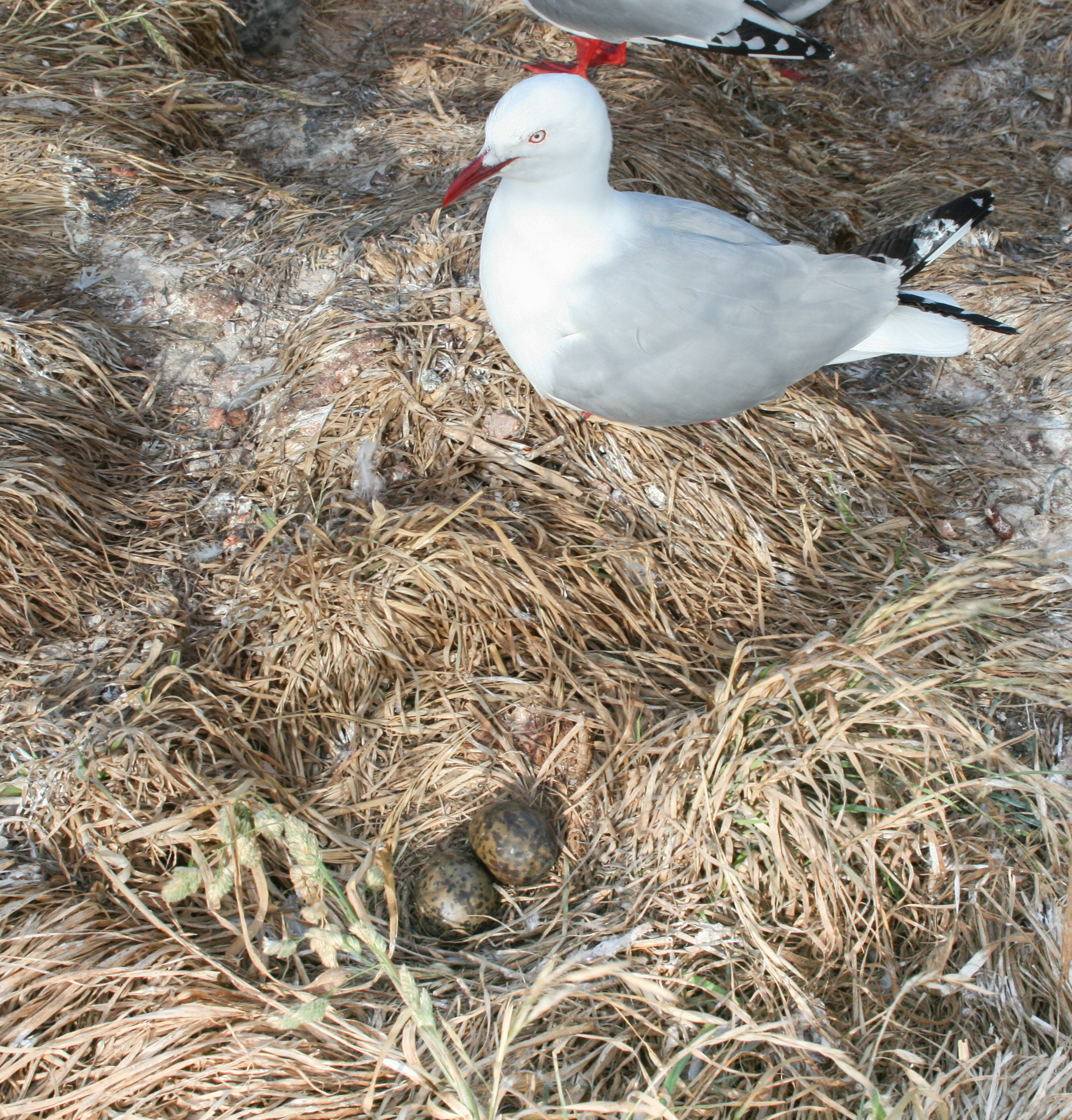
Eggs

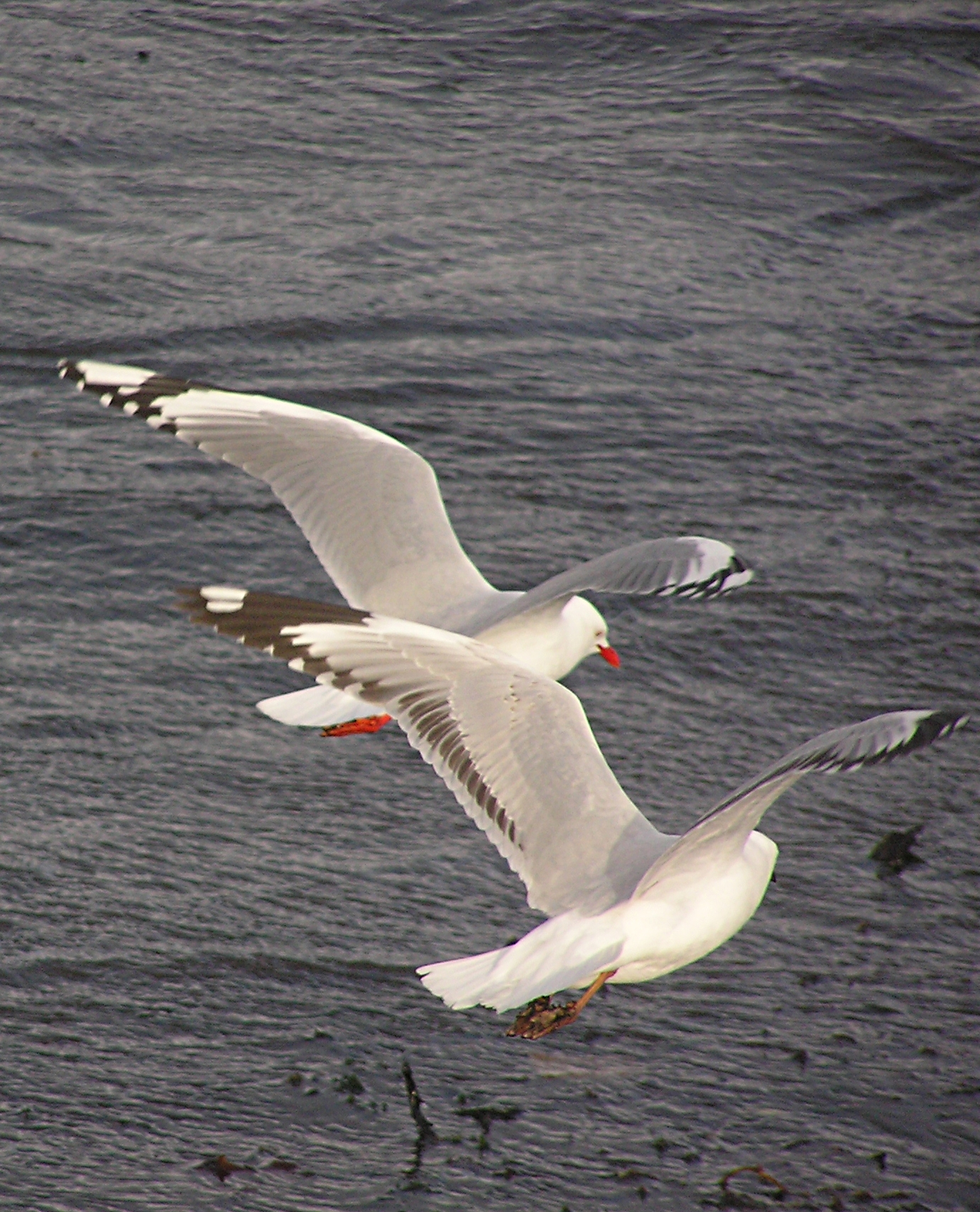
Comparison of adult (left) and immature (right) red-billed gulls in flight

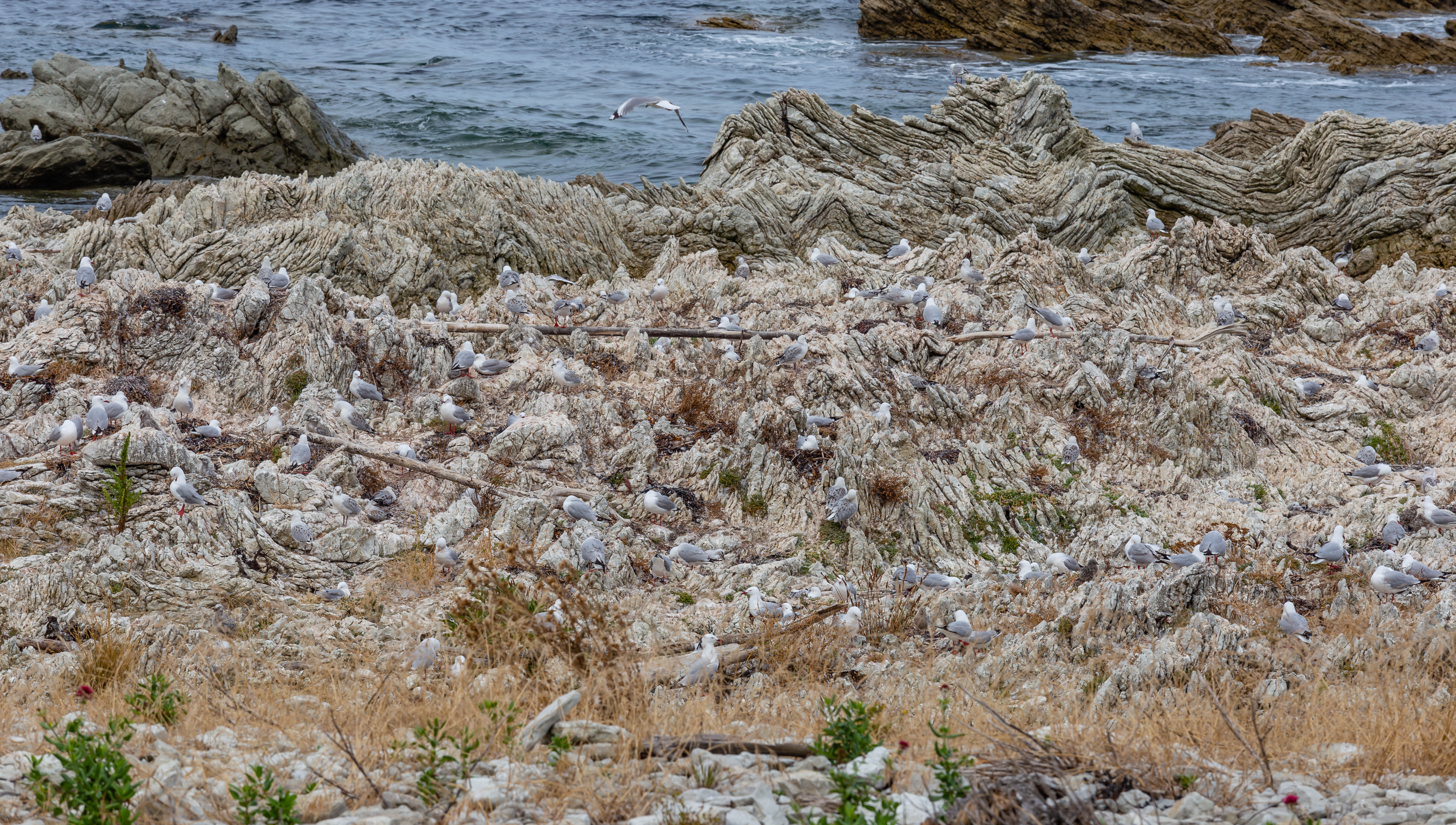
Sea gull colony in Kaikōura

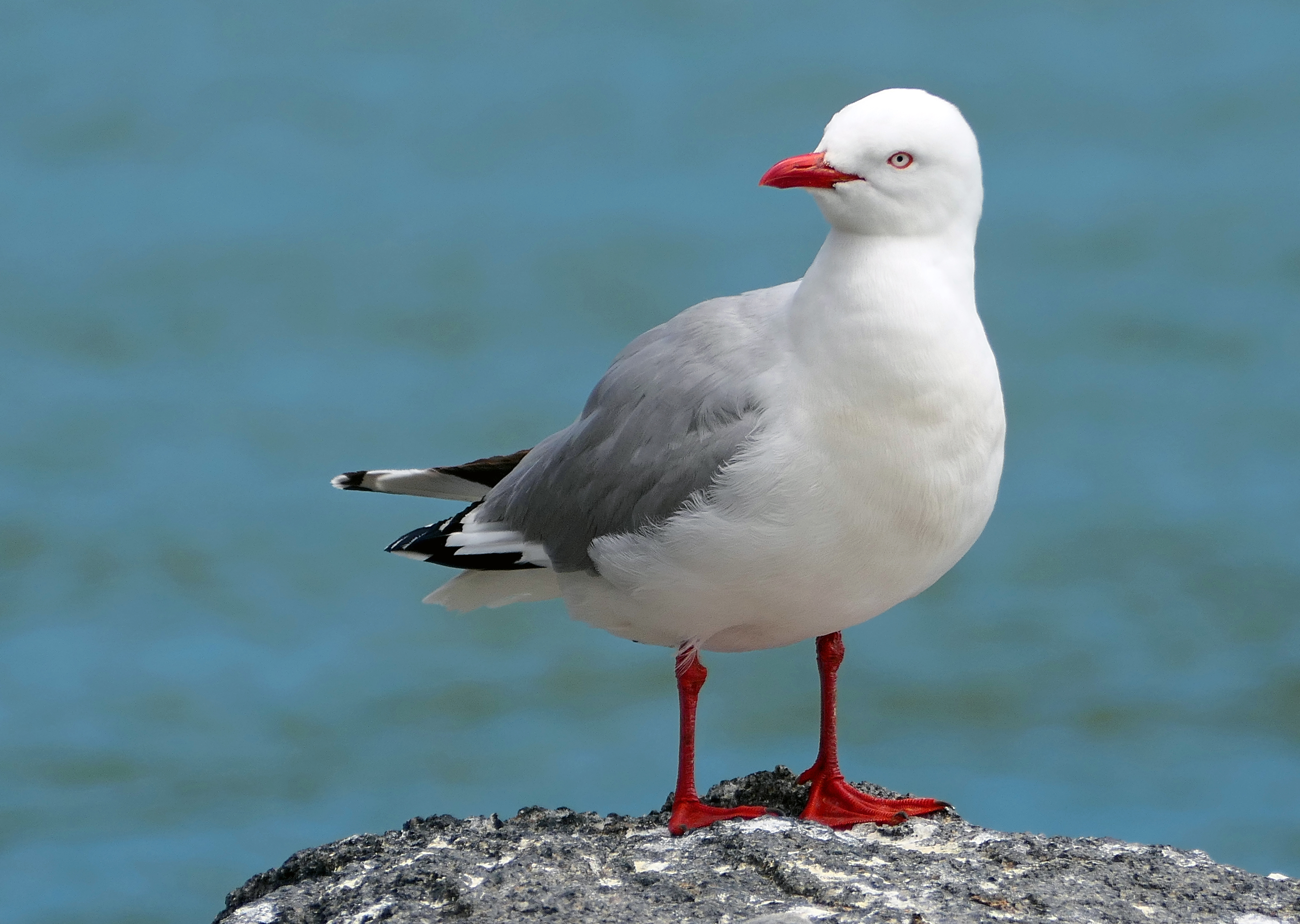
2021 photo
