= CableHell =

Independent consumer lobby group

CableHell was an independent consumer lobby group designed by customers of Virgin Media (previously known as NTL/Telewest for Cable TV services in the UK) to discuss issues and create a community where people could submit their own views of the company, and opinions on how to improve products or services. The forum membership included a number of Virgin Media employees who helped out customers of Virgin Media and provided a source of official information.

CableHell was occasionally cited by global news sources such as the BBC, The Times and The Guardian as well as other online publications.

Started in April 2002, CableHell was one of the UK's larger ex-ntl: focused customer support forums in the UK. There were numerous forums available for members, for each different type of service which Virgin Media provides; such as Digital TV, Telephone, Internet and Mobile. There were also alternative forums for other topics and providers, as well as a number of support and FAQ guides available.

The forum was previously known as Ntl:hell however with the re-branding of NTL/Telewest, the name changed to reflect this.

== Employee Hacking ==
An employee of ntl was alleged to have attempted to hack the forum on New Year's Eve 2002, and send abusive messages to their members. The hacker was traced back to Ntl offices and the company later carried out a formal internal investigation . Ntl terminated the employment of the individual and apologised to the forum .

== Closure ==
At 10:34pm on March 16, 2009, the site was taken offline by its owner without advance notice or explanation. At that time it had 387,625 posts, and 34,332 registered members.

On February 23, 2010, Cable Forum announced the closure of Cable Hell by its domain owner, and its acquisition by Cable Forum, with the old Cable Hell Domain now redirecting to the Cable Forum site. The former Cable Hell moderating team began encouraging Cable Hell members to join a new 'temporary' site on Facebook. In a statement, Cable Forum said it wished to encourage Cable Hell members to become members of Cable Forum.

The CableHell team members later re-launched a forum as Interhell, however, that forum has had a database error message on it for a few years now.

== Relaunch ==
Cablehell logo 2026

In 2026, CableHell was relaunched as an independent community website, reviving the CableHell name and domain following the closure of the original forum. The relaunched site retains the project's original focus on consumer discussion, support and community participation, while operating independently of Virgin Media and its predecessor companies. The relaunch represents a return of the CableHell name after more than a decade of inactivity following the closure of the original forum and the subsequent failure of the Interhell successor site.

- Virgin Media
- Nthellworld
