= Whitestone River =

Coordinates: 45°32′S 167°45′E

- Native name: Māori: Ōtūmatua

Location
- Country: New Zealand

The Whitestone River (Māori: Ōtūmatua) is a river in New Zealand, a tributary of the Mararoa River. It has been identified as an Important Bird Area by BirdLife International because it supports breeding colonies of the endangered black-billed gull.

== See also ==
- List of rivers of New Zealand
