= White Stone =

White Stone may refer to:

- White Stone, South Carolina, an unincorporated community in Spartanburg County
- White Stone, Virginia, a town in Lancaster County
- White Stone Lake, a lake in Chisago County, Minnesota

== See also ==
- Whitestone (disambiguation)
- White Stones, a 1997 album by Secret Garden
