= Mavora Lakes =

Protected area in New Zealand

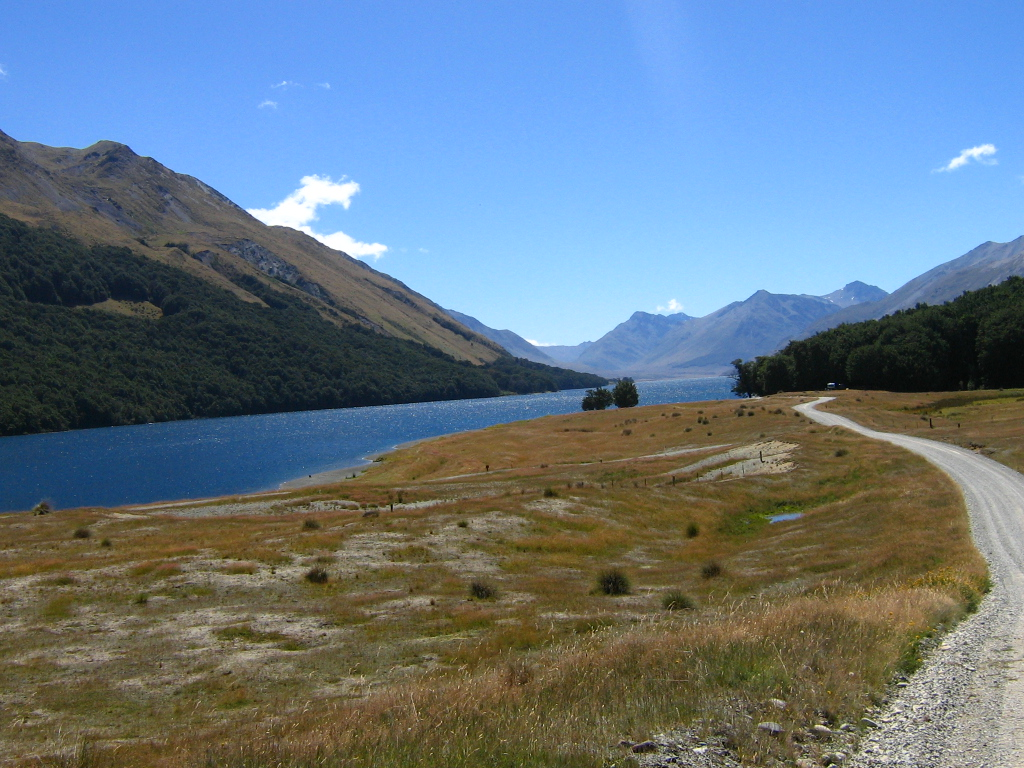
- North Mavora Lake

- Location within New Zealand
- Location: New Zealand
- Coordinates: 45°15′20″S 168°10′05″E
- Governing body: Department of Conservation

Mavora Lakes, also known as the Mavora Lakes Conservation Park, is a protected area in the South Island of New Zealand consisting of two lakes: North Mavora and South Mavora. The lakes are drained by the Mararoa River. The area is managed by the Department of Conservation, and is part of Te Wahipounamu, a World Heritage Area.

The area was used as a film location for The Lord of the Rings film trilogy.

The park has a rudimentary campsite and a range of tracks.

== Geography ==
The two lakes located west of Lake Wakatipu and east of Lake Te Anau:

- North Mavora (45.2287°S 168.1706°E)
- South Mavora (45.3033°S 168.1741°E)
