= Whitstone (disambiguation) =

Whitstone is a village in Cornwall, United Kingdom.

Whitstone may also refer to

- Whitstone (hundred), an ancient subdivision of Gloucestershire, England
- Whitstone (Somerset hundred), an ancient subdivision of Somerset, England
- Whitstone School, Somerset, England

== See also ==
- Whitestone (disambiguation)
