= Nthellworld =

UK consumer lobby group

nthellworld logo

nthellworld was one of the first mainstream independent consumer lobby groups in the United Kingdom, whose main focal point was British ISP and Cable television company ntl Group. nthellworld.com was created by Frank Whitestone, a university student, in November 2000 to create a community where people could discuss NTL issues, submit their own views of the company and publicise ntl's failings.

Frank Whitestone later joined NTL and sold nthellworld.com to them in the process. ntl:home, as the consumer division of the NTL was known (now Virgin Media), closed nthellworld.com in November 2003. However, in June 2003 after foreseeing the closure of the original nthellworld site by NTL, Neil Crayne and Mick Ramsden, launched a new version of nthellworld using the domain nthellworld.co.uk, which was purchased from its original owner by Frank Whitestone as an insurance policy shortly after joining NTL. In February 2004, nthellworld was renamed Cable Forum in preparation for an NTL - Telewest merger and to shift the emphasis of nthellworld in a positive direction. In October 2005, merger plans were confirmed by ntl and Telewest boards. NTL (Now Virgin Media) provides an official community forum for its customers.

== Dates ==
- Nov 2000 : nthellworld.com created
- Apr 2002 : Frank Whitestone takes job at NTL and sells nthellworld to company
- Feb 2003 : nthellworld leaks information regarding a controversial broadband bandwidth cap which provokes a consumer backlash
- Jun 2003 : nthellworld.co.uk launched by former administrators
- Oct 2003 : Frank Whitestone quits ntl, ntl pull nthellworld.com
- Nov 2003 : ntl confirm nthellworld.com closure
- Feb 2004 : nthellworld.co.uk renamed Cable Forum
- April 2005 : Simon Duffy, ntl chief executive officer, invites Cable Forum to meeting to discuss overall customer service issues.
- 16 July 2007 (23:55): Cable Forum passes 1 million posts.
- 23 Feb 2010 : The former CableHell domain and database were acquired by Cable Forum.

== See also ==
- CableHell
