= Mararoa River =

River in New Zealand

Coordinates: 45.6151°S 167.693°E

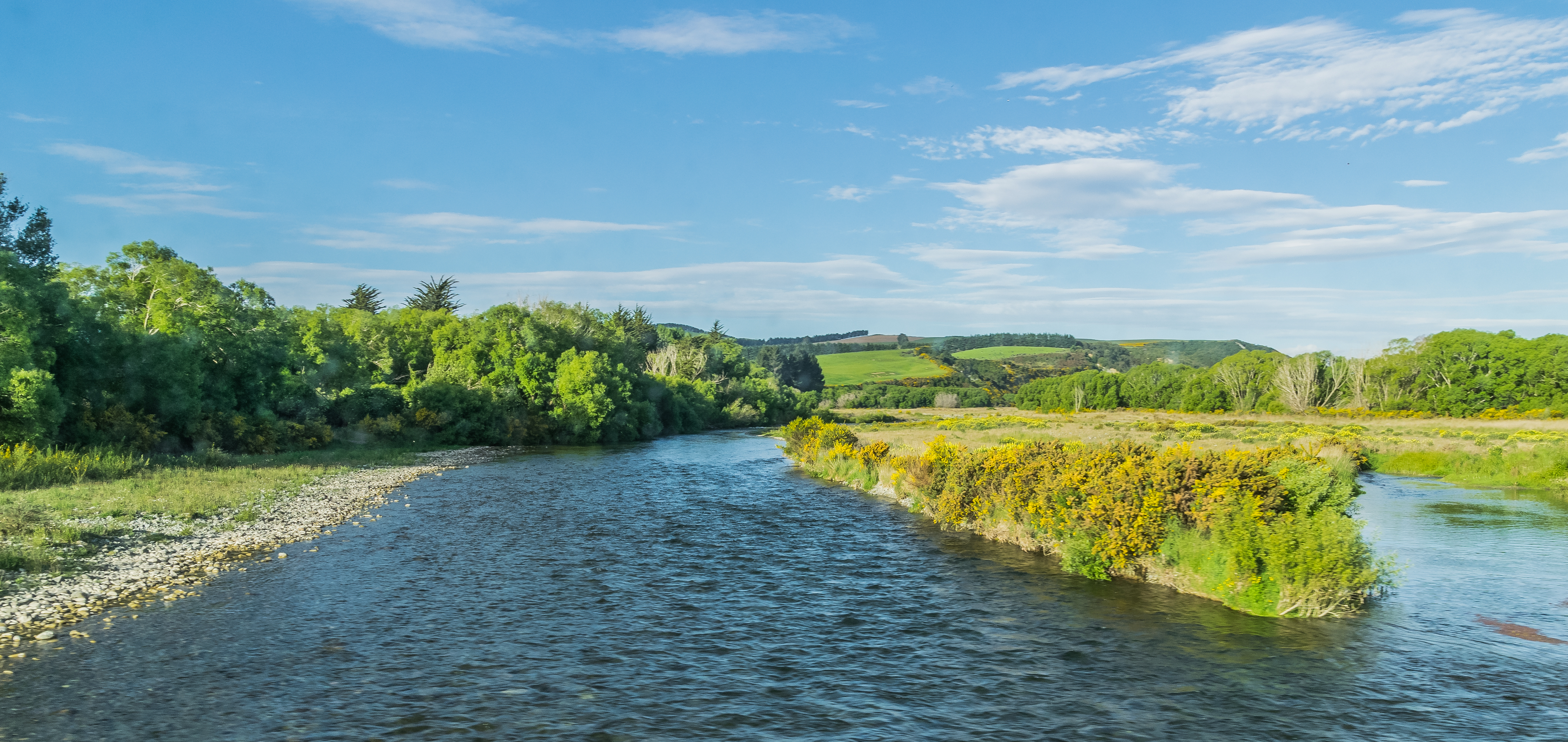

Location
- Country: New Zealand

Physical characteristics
- Source
  - location: Livingstone and Thomson Mountains
- Mouth
  - location: Waiau River
  - elevation: 200 m (660 ft)

The Mararoa River is one of the braided rivers of the Southland Region of the South Island of New Zealand.

The New Zealand Ministry for Culture and Heritage gives a translation of "long-lasting cultivations" for Māraroa.

== Description ==
The river feeds into the Mavora Lakes and discharges into the Waiau River eight kilometres downstream from where it leaves Lake Manapouri. Water from the Mararoa River is fed into the Waiau River by a control structure at the confluence of the two rivers. This is used to control the level of Lake Manapouri for hydroelectric power generation.

The river has been identified as an Important Bird Area by BirdLife International because it supports breeding colonies of the endangered black-billed gull. Didymo, an invasive organism discovered in New Zealand in 2004, has been found in the river.

== See also ==
- List of rivers of New Zealand
