= List of moths of Ireland =

Phylogenetic chart of the Lepidoptera

Irish moths represent about 1,400 different types of moths. The moths (mostly nocturnal) and butterflies (mostly diurnal) together make up the taxonomic order Lepidoptera.

This is a list of moth species which have been recorded in Ireland.

== Suborder Zeugloptera (mandibulate archaic moths) ==
=== Superfamily Micropterigoidea ===
==== Family Micropterigidae ====
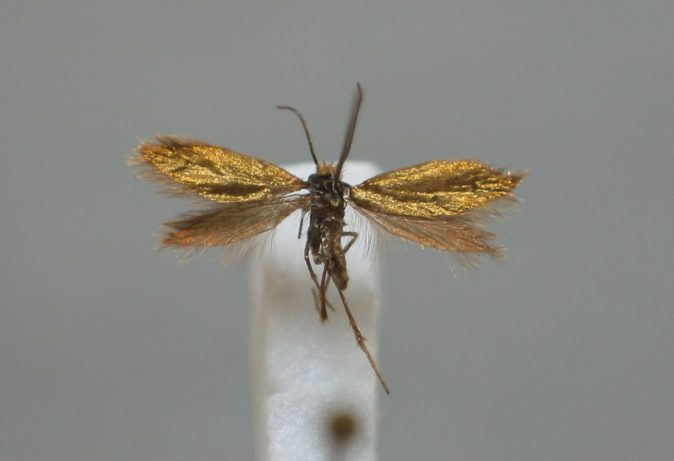
Micropterix aruncella

- Micropterix aruncella (Scopoli, 1763)
- Micropterix aureatella (Scopoli, 1763)
- Micropterix calthella (Linnaeus, 1761) (marsh marigold moth)
- Micropterix mansuetella Zeller, 1844

== Suborder Glossata (moths and butterflies with a coilable proboscis) ==
=== Infraorder Dacnonypha ===
==== Superfamily Eriocranioidea ====
===== Family Eriocraniidae =====
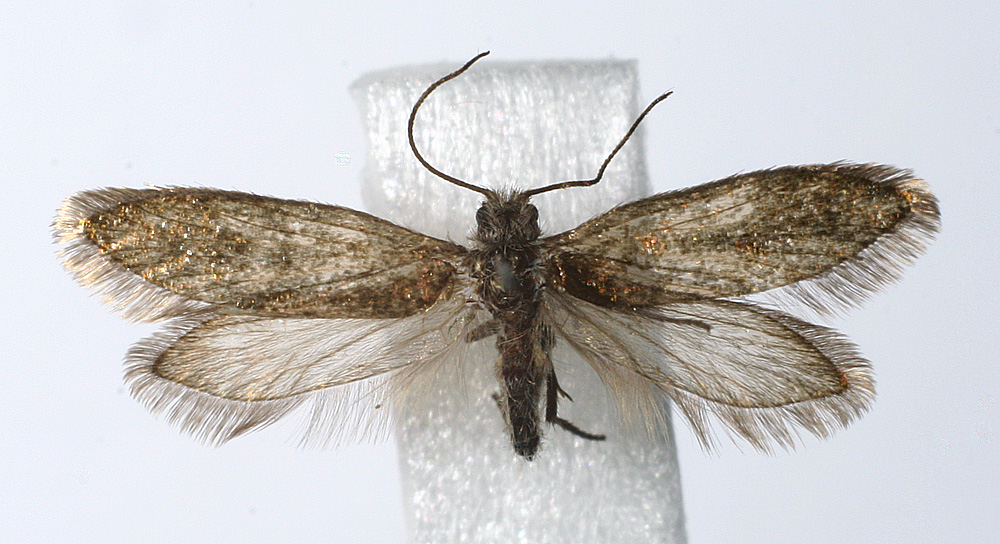
Eriocrania cicatricella

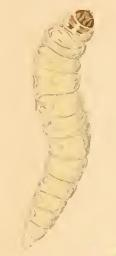
Eriocrania unimaculella larva

- Dyseriocrania subpurpurella (Haworth, 1828)
- Eriocrania cicatricella (Zetterstedt, 1839)
- Eriocrania salopiella (Stainton, 1854) (small birch purple)
- Eriocrania sangii (Wood, 1891) (large birch purple)
- Eriocrania semipurpurella (Stephens, 1835) (purplish birch-miner)
- Eriocrania sparrmannella (Bosc, 1791) (mottled purple)
- Eriocrania unimaculella (Zetterstedt, 1839) (white-spot purple)
- Paracrania chrysolepidella (Zeller, 1851) (small hazel purple)

=== Infraorder Exoporia ===
==== Superfamily Hepialoidea (ghost moths, swift moths) ====
===== Family Hepialidae =====
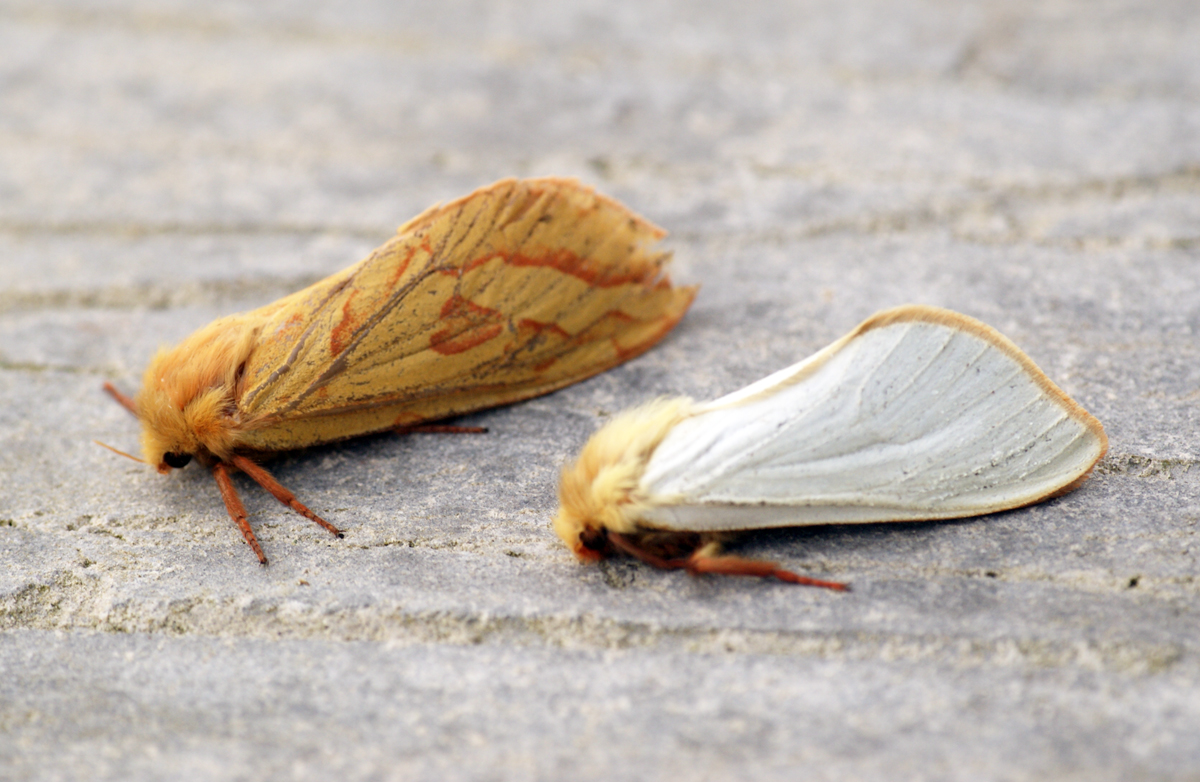
Ghost swift, female and male adults.

- Hepialus humuli (Linnaeus, 1758) (ghost swift)
- Pharmacis fusconebulosa (De Geer, 1778) (map-winged swift)
- Korscheltellus lupulina (Linnaeus, 1758) (common swift)
- Phymatopus hecta (Linnaeus, 1758) (gold swift)

=== Division Monotrysia (females have a single genital opening) ===
==== Section Nepticulina ====
===== Superfamily Nepticuloidea =====
====== Family Nepticulidae (pigmy or midget moths) ======
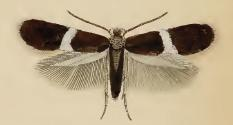
The small birch leafminer

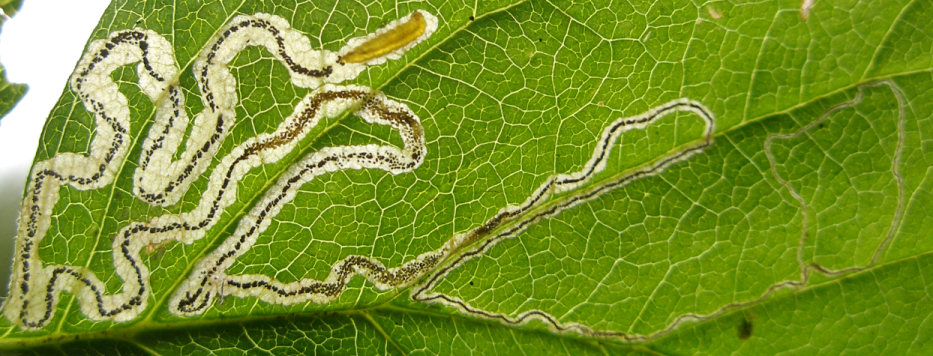
Leaf mining damage by Stigmella splendidissimella larva

- Bohemannia pulverosella (Stainton, 1849)
- Bohemannia quadrimaculella (Boheman, 1851)
- Ectoedemia albifasciella (Heinemann, 1871)
- Ectoedemia angulifasciella (Stainton, 1849)
- Ectoedemia arcuatella (Herrich-Schäffer, 1855)
- Ectoedemia argyropeza (Zeller, 1839)
- Ectoedemia atricollis (Stainton, 1857)
- Ectoedemia heringella (Mariani, 1939)
- Ectoedemia heringi (Toll, 1934)
- Ectoedemia intimella (Zeller, 1848)
- Ectoedemia minimella (Zetterstedt, 1839)
- Ectoedemia occultella (Linnaeus, 1767) (small birch leafminer)
- Ectoedemia rubivora (Wocke, 1860)
- Ectoedemia subbimaculella (Haworth, 1828)
- Ectoedemia septembrella (Stainton, 1849)
- Enteucha acetosae (Stainton, 1854) (pygmy sorrel moth)
- Stigmella aeneofasciella (Herrich-Schäffer, 1855)
- Stigmella alnetella (Stainton, 1856)
- Stigmella anomalella (Goeze, 1783) (rose leaf miner)
- Stigmella atricapitella (Haworth, 1828)
- Stigmella aurella (Fabricius, 1775)
- Stigmella auromarginella (Richardson, 1890)
- Stigmella betulicola (Stainton, 1856)
- Stigmella catharticella (Stainton, 1853)
- Stigmella centifoliella (Zeller, 1848)
- Stigmella confusella (Wood & Walsingham, 1894)
- Stigmella continuella (Stainton, 1856)
- Stigmella crataegella (Klimesch, 1936)
- Stigmella dryadella (O. Hofmann, 1868)
- Stigmella filipendulae (Wocke, 1871)
- Stigmella floslactella (Haworth, 1828)
- Stigmella glutinosae (Stainton, 1858)
- Stigmella hemargyrella (Kollar, 1832)
- Stigmella hybnerella (Hübner, 1796) (greenish thorn pygmy)
- Stigmella lapponica (Wocke, 1862)
- Stigmella lemniscella (Zeller, 1839)
- Stigmella luteella (Stainton, 1857)
- Stigmella magdalenae (Klimesch, 1950)
- Stigmella malella (Stainton, 1854) (banded apple pigmy)
- Stigmella microtheriella (Stainton, 1854) (hazel leaf miner moth)
- Stigmella myrtillella (Stainton, 1857)
- Stigmella nylandriella (Tengstrom, 1848)
- Stigmella obliquella (Heinemann, 1862)
- Stigmella oxyacanthella (Stainton, 1854)
- Stigmella paradoxa (Frey, 1858)
- Stigmella perpygmaeella (Doubleday, 1859)
- Stigmella plagicolella (Stainton, 1854)
- Stigmella poterii (Stainton, 1857)
- Stigmella ruficapitella (Haworth, 1828)
- Stigmella salicis (Stainton, 1854)
- Stigmella sorbi (Stainton, 1861)
- Stigmella spinosissimae (Waters, 1928)
- Stigmella splendidissimella (Herrich-Schäffer, 1855)
- Stigmella svenssoni (Johansson, 1971)
- Stigmella tityrella (Stainton, 1854)
- Stigmella trimaculella (Haworth, 1828)
- Stigmella ulmivora (Fologne, 1860)
- Trifurcula cryptella (Stainton, 1856)
- Trifurcula eurema (Tutt, 1899)
- Trifurcula immundella (Zeller, 1839) (broom pygmy moth)
- Trifurcula subnitidella (Duponchel, 1843)

====== Family Opostegidae (white eyecap moths) ======
- Opostega salaciella (Treitschke, 1833)
- Pseudopostega crepusculella (Zeller, 1839)

===== Superfamily Tischerioidea (trumpet leaf miner moths) =====
====== Family Tischeriidae ======
- Coptotriche marginea (Haworth, 1828)
- Tischeria dodonea Stainton, 1858
- Tischeria ekebladella (Bjerkander, 1795)

==== Section Incurvariina ====
===== Superfamily Adeloidea (moths with piercing, extensible ovipositor) =====
====== Family Incurvariidae ======
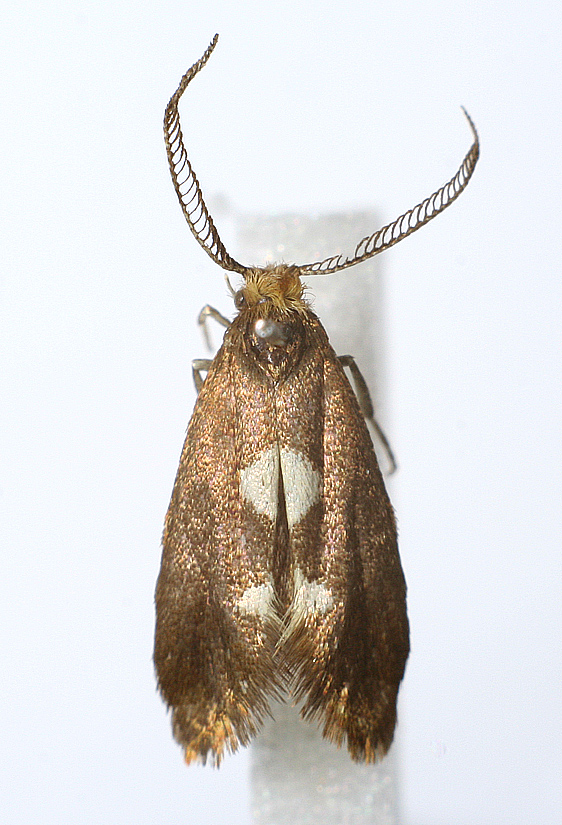
Male feathered diamond-back

- Incurvaria masculella (Denis & Schiffermüller, 1775) (feathered diamond-back)
- Incurvaria oehlmanniella (Hübner, 1796)
- Incurvaria pectinea Haworth, 1828
- Incurvaria praelatella (Denis & Schiffermüller, 1775)
- Phylloporia bistrigella (Haworth, 1828)

====== Family Prodoxidae ======
- Lampronia corticella (Linnaeus, 1758) (raspberry moth)
- Lampronia luzella (Hübner, 1817)
- Lampronia pubicornis (Haworth, 1828)

====== Family Adelidae (fairy longhorn moths) ======
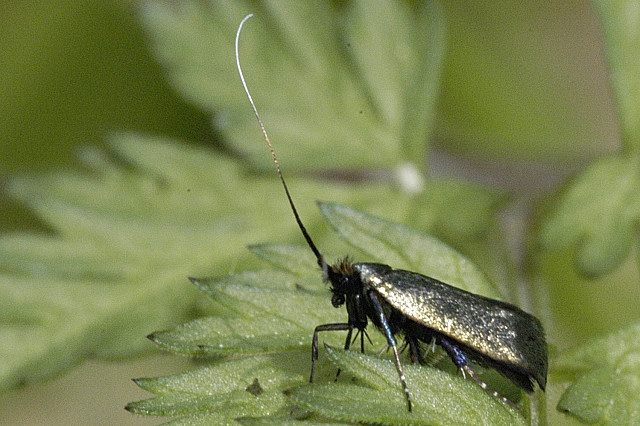
Female green longhorn

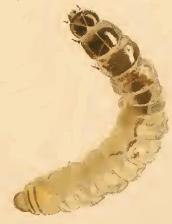
Cauchas rufimitrella larva

- Adela croesella (Scopoli, 1763)
- Adela cuprella (Denis & Schiffermüller, 1775)
- Adela reaumurella (Linnaeus, 1758) (green longhorn)
- Cauchas rufimitrella (Scopoli, 1763)
- Nematopogon magna (Zeller, 1878)
- Nematopogon metaxella (Hübner, 1813)
- Nematopogon pilella (Denis & Schiffermüller, 1775)
- Nematopogon schwarziellus Zeller, 1839
- Nematopogon swammerdamella (Linnaeus, 1758)
- Nemophora cupriacella (Hübner, 1819)
- Nemophora degeerella (Linnaeus, 1758) (longhorn moth, yellow-barred long-horn)
- Nemophora minimella (Denis & Schiffermüller, 1775)

====== Family Heliozelidae ======
- Heliozela hammoniella Sorhagen, 1885
- Heliozela resplendella (Stainton, 1851)
- Heliozela sericiella (Haworth, 1828)

=== Division Ditrysia (females have two genital openings) ===
==== Section Tineina ====
===== Superfamily Tineoidea (clothes moths, bagworms, etc.) =====
====== Family Psychidae (bagworm moths) ======
- Diplodoma laichartingella (Goeze, 1783)
- Epichnopterix plumella Denis & Schiffermüller, 1775
- Luffia ferchaultella (Stephens, 1850)
- Psyche casta Pallas, 1767

====== Family Tineidae (fungus moths) ======
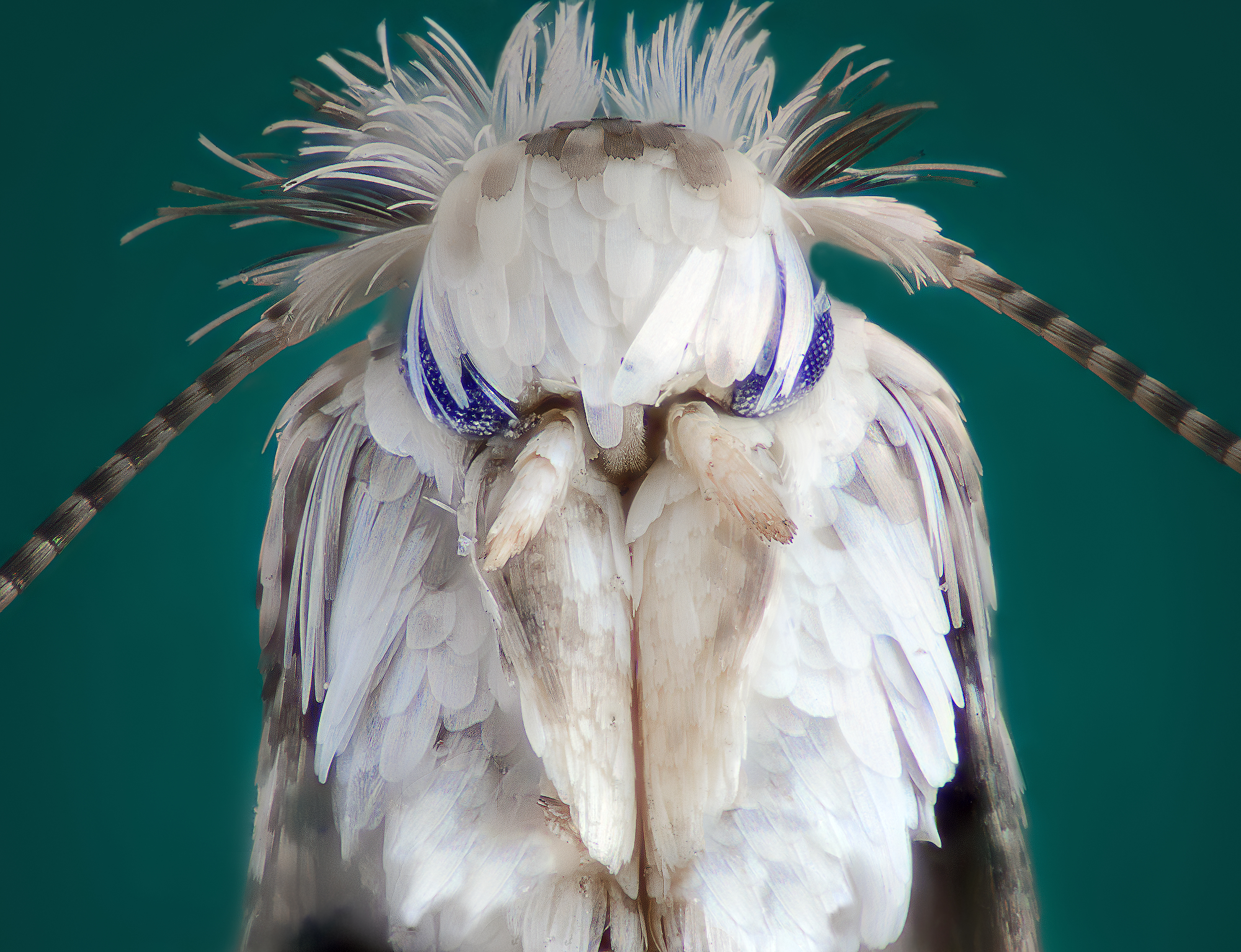
Closeup on the head of a common clothes moth

- Dryadaula pactolia Meyrick, 1902
- Monopis crocicapitella (Clemens, 1859) (pale-backed clothes moth)
- Monopis laevigella (Denis & Schiffermüller, 1775) (skin moth)
- Monopis obviella (Denis & Schiffermüller, 1775)
- Nemapogon cloacella (Haworth, 1828) (cork moth)
- Nemapogon granella (Linnaeus, 1758) (European grain worm, European grain moth)
- Nemapogon ruricolella (Stainton, 1859) (gold-sheen clothes moth)
- Niditinea fuscella (Linnaeus, 1758) (brown-dotted clothes moth)
- Psychoides filicivora (Meyrick, 1937)
- Psychoides verhuella Bruand, 1853
- Tinea dubiella Stainton, 1859
- Tinea flavescentella Haworth, 1828
- Tinea pallescentella Stainton, 1851 (large pale clothes moth)
- Tinea pellionella Linnaeus, 1758 (case-bearing clothes moth)
- Tinea semifulvella Haworth, 1828
- Tinea trinotella Thunberg, 1794
- Tineola bisselliella (Hummel, 1823) (common clothes moth, webbing clothes moth)
- Trichophaga tapetzella (Linnaeus, 1758) (tapestry moth, carpet moth)

===== Superfamily Gracillarioidea =====
====== Family Bucculatricidae (ribbed cocoon makers) ======
- Bucculatrix bechsteinella (Bechstein & Scharfenberg, 1805)
- Bucculatrix cidarella (Zeller, 1839)
- Bucculatrix cristatella (Zeller, 1839)
- Bucculatrix demaryella (Duponchel, 1840) (birch bent-wing)
- Bucculatrix frangutella (Goeze, 1783)
- Bucculatrix maritima Stainton, 1851
- Bucculatrix nigricomella (Zeller, 1839)
- Bucculatrix ulmella Zeller, 1848

====== Family Gracillariidae (leaf miner moths) ======
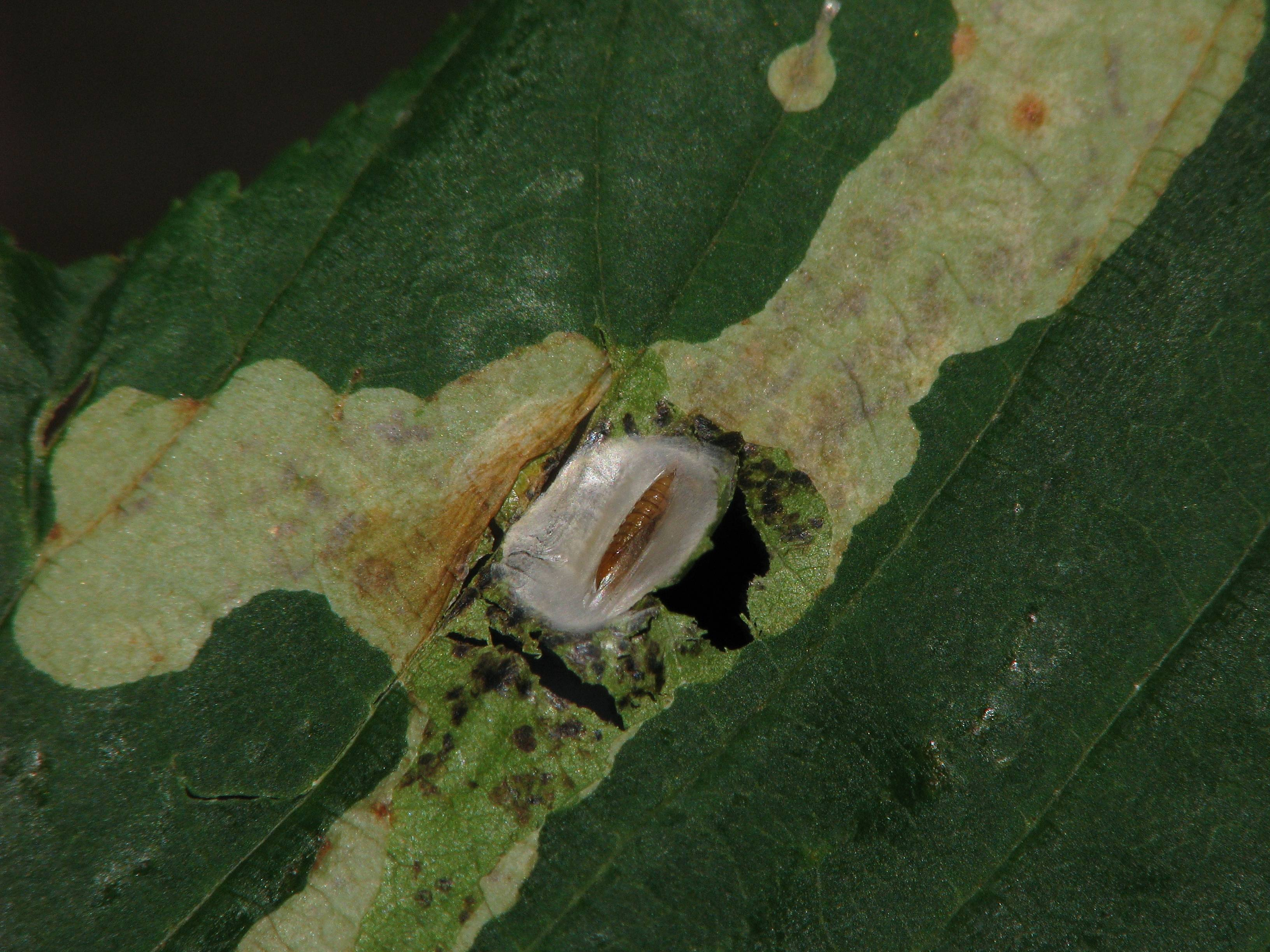
Pupa of the horse-chestnut leaf miner

- Acrocercops brongniardella (Fabricius, 1798) (leaf blotch miner moth)
- Aspilapteryx tringipennella (Zeller, 1839)
- Callisto denticulella (Thunberg, 1794)
- Caloptilia alchimiella (Scopoli, 1763) (yellow-triangle slender)
- Caloptilia azaleella (Brants, 1913) (azalea leaf miner)
- Caloptilia betulicola (M. Hering, 1928) (red birch slender)
- Caloptilia cuculipennella (Hübner, 1796) (feathered slender)
- Caloptilia elongella (Linnaeus, 1761) (pale red slender)
- Caloptilia falconipennella (Hübner, 1813)
- Caloptilia populetorum (Zeller, 1839) (clouded slender)
- Caloptilia robustella Jackh, 1972 (new oak slender)
- Caloptilia rufipennella Hübner, 1796 (small red slender)
- Caloptilia stigmatella (Fabricius, 1781)
- Calybites phasianipennella (Hübner, 1813)
- Cameraria ohridella Deschka & Dimić, 1986 (horse-chestnut leaf miner)
- Euspilapteryx auroguttella Stephens, 1835
- Gracillaria syringella (Fabricius, 1794) (lilac leafminer, privet leafminer)
- Parornix anglicella (Stainton, 1850)
- Parornix betulae (Stainton, 1854)
- Parornix devoniella (Stainton, 1850)
- Parornix loganella (Stainton, 1848)
- Parornix scoticella (Stainton, 1850)
- Parornix torquillella (Zeller, 1850)
- Phyllocnistis unipunctella (Stephens, 1834)
- Phyllonorycter blancardella (Fabricius, 1781) (spotted tentiform leafminer)
- Phyllonorycter cerasicolella (Herrich-Schäffer, 1855)
- Phyllonorycter coryli (Nicelli, 1851) (nut leaf blister moth)
- Phyllonorycter corylifoliella (Hübner, 1796) (hawthorn red midget moth)
- Phyllonorycter emberizaepenella (Bouche, 1834)
- Phyllonorycter froelichiella (Zeller, 1839)
- Phyllonorycter harrisella (Linnaeus, 1761)
- Phyllonorycter heegeriella (Zeller, 1846)
- Phyllonorycter hilarella (Zetterstedt, 1839)
- Phyllonorycter hostis Triberti, 2007
- Phyllonorycter insignitella (Zeller, 1846)
- Phyllonorycter klemannella (Fabricius, 1781)
- Phyllonorycter lautella (Zeller, 1846)
- Phyllonorycter leucographella (Zeller, 1850) (firethorn leaf miner)
- Phyllonorycter maestingella (Muller, 1764)
- Phyllonorycter mespilella (Hübner, 1805)
- Phyllonorycter messaniella (Zeller, 1846) (European oak leaf-miner, Zeller's midget)
- Phyllonorycter nicellii (Stainton, 1851)
- Phyllonorycter nigrescentella (Logan, 1851)
- Phyllonorycter oxyacanthae (Frey, 1856)
- Phyllonorycter quercifoliella (Zeller, 1839)
- Phyllonorycter quinqueguttella (Stainton, 1851)
- Phyllonorycter rajella (Linnaeus, 1758)
- Phyllonorycter roboris (Zeller, 1839)
- Phyllonorycter salicicolella (Sircom, 1848)
- Phyllonorycter salictella (Zeller, 1846)
- Phyllonorycter scopariella (Zeller, 1846)
- Phyllonorycter sorbi (Frey, 1855)
- Phyllonorycter spinicolella (Zeller, 1846) (sloe midget)
- Phyllonorycter trifasciella (Haworth, 1828)
- Phyllonorycter ulmifoliella (Hübner, 1817)
- Phyllonorycter viminetorum (Stainton, 1854)
- Caloptilia leucapennella (Stephens, 1835)

===== Superfamily Schreckensteinioidea =====
====== Family Schreckensteiniidae (bristle-legged moths) ======
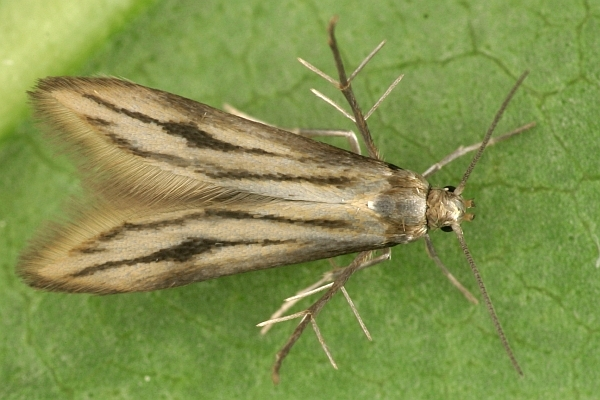
A blackberry skeletonizer (Schreckensteinia festaliella). Note the distinctive bristly legs.

- Schreckensteinia festaliella (Hübner, [1819]) (blackberry skeletonizer)

===== Superfamily Gelechioidea (case-bearers, twirler moths, curved-horn moths) =====
====== Family Agonoxenidae (palm moths) ======
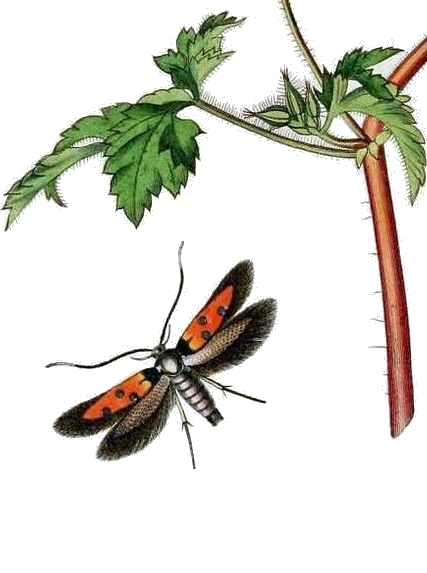
Chrysoclista linneella and its favourite food, the lime tree.

- Chrysoclista lathamella (T. B. Fletcher, 1936)
- Chrysoclista linneella (Clerck, 1759) (Linnaeus's spangle-wing, linden bark borer, cosmet)

====== Family Batrachedridae ======
- Batrachedra praeangusta (Haworth, 1828)

====== Family Blastobasidae ======
- Blastobasis adustella Walsingham, 1894
- Blastobasis lacticolella Rebel, 1940

====== Family Coleophoridae (case-bearers) ======
- Coleophora adjunctella Hodgkinson, 1882
- Coleophora adspersella Benander, 1939
- Coleophora albicosta (Haworth, 1828) (testaceous white-back)
- Coleophora albidella (Denis & Schiffermüller, 1775)
- Coleophora alticolella Zeller, 1849
- Coleophora anatipennella (Hübner, 1796)
- Coleophora argentula (Stephens, 1834)
- Coleophora atriplicis Meyrick, 1928
- Coleophora betulella Heinemann, 1877
- Coleophora binderella (Kollar, 1832)
- Coleophora caespititiella Zeller, 1839
- Coleophora deauratella Lienig & Zeller, 1846
- Coleophora discordella Zeller, 1849
- Coleophora flavipennella (Duponchel, 1843)
- Coleophora follicularis (Vallot, 1802)
- Coleophora fuscocuprella Herrich-Schäffer, 1855
- Coleophora glaucicolella Wood, 1892
- Coleophora gryphipennella (Hübner, 1796)
- Coleophora juncicolella Stainton, 1851
- Coleophora laricella (Hübner, 1817) (western larch case-bearer)
- Coleophora lassella Staudinger, 1859
- Coleophora lithargyrinella Zeller, 1849
- Coleophora lixella Zeller, 1849
- Coleophora lusciniaepennella (Treitschke, 1833)
- Coleophora lutipennella (Zeller, 1838)
- Coleophora maritimella Newman, 1863
- Coleophora mayrella (Hübner, 1813) (metallic coleophora moth)
- Coleophora milvipennis Zeller, 1839
- Coleophora orbitella Zeller, 1849
- Coleophora otidipennella (Hübner, 1817)
- Coleophora pappiferella Hofmann, 1869
- Coleophora paripennella Zeller, 1839
- Coleophora peribenanderi Toll, 1943
- Coleophora potentillae Elisha, 1885
- Coleophora pyrrhulipennella Zeller, 1839
- Coleophora ramosella Zeller, 1849
- Coleophora salicorniae Heinemann & Wocke, 1877
- Coleophora saxicolella (Duponchel, 1843)
- Coleophora serratella (Linnaeus, 1761)
- Coleophora siccifolia Stainton, 1856
- Coleophora spinella (Schrank, 1802) (apple-and-plum casebearer)
- Coleophora striatipennella Nylander in Tengstrom, 1848
- Coleophora sylvaticella Wood, 1892
- Coleophora taeniipennella Herrich-Schäffer, 1855
- Coleophora tamesis Waters, 1929
- Coleophora therinella Tengstrom, 1848
- Coleophora trifolii (Curtis, 1832) (trefoil thick-horned tinea, large clover case-bearer)
- Coleophora trochilella (Duponchel, 1843)
- Coleophora versurella Zeller, 1849
- Coleophora virgaureae Stainton, 1857

====== Family Cosmopterigidae (cosmet moths) ======
- Cosmopterix lienigiella Zeller, 1846
- Cosmopterix orichalcea Stainton, 1861
- Limnaecia phragmitella Stainton, 1851 (shy cosmet moth)
- Pancalia leuwenhoekella (Linnaeus, 1761)
- Pancalia schwarzella (Fabricius, 1798)
- Sorhagenia lophyrella (Douglas, 1846)
- Sorhagenia rhamniella (Zeller, 1839)

====== Family Elachistidae (grass-miner moths) ======
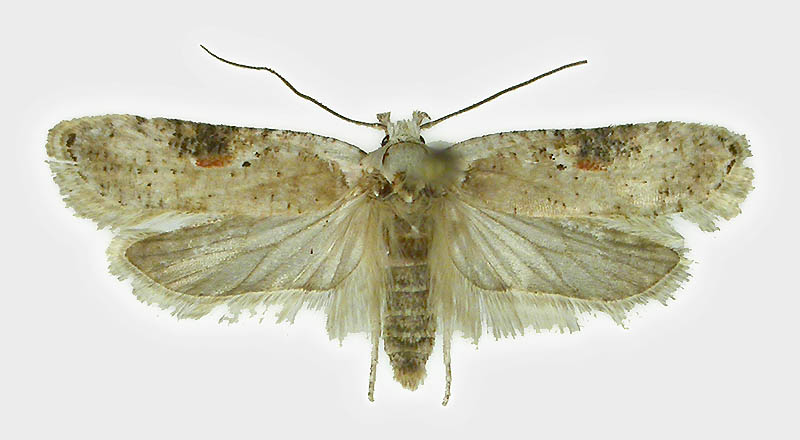
Agonopterix alstroemeriana, the hemlock moth

- Blastodacna atra (apple pith moth) (Haworth, 1828)
- Chrysoclista lathamella (T. B. Fletcher, 1936)
- Elachista adscitella Stainton, 1851
- Elachista argentella (Clerck, 1759)
- Elachista bisulcella (Duponchel, 1843)
- Elachista cahorsensis Traugott-Olsen, 1992
- Elachista gangabella Zeller, 1850
- Elachista obliquella Stainton, 1854
- Elachista subalbidella Schlager, 1847
- Elachista subocellea (Stephens, 1834)
- Elachista triatomea (Haworth, 1828)
- Elachista albidella Nylander, 1848
- Elachista albifrontella (Hübner, 1817)
- Elachista alpinella Stainton, 1854
- Elachista apicipunctella Stainton, 1849
- Elachista atricomella Stainton, 1849
- Elachista canapennella (Hübner, 1813)
- Elachista cinereopunctella (Haworth, 1828)
- Elachista consortella Stainton, 1851
- Elachista eleochariella Stainton, 1851
- Elachista freyerella (Hübner, 1825)
- Elachista gleichenella (Fabricius, 1781)
- Elachista humilis Zeller, 1850
- Elachista kilmunella Stainton, 1849
- Elachista luticomella Zeller, 1839
- Elachista maculicerusella (Bruand, 1859)
- Elachista occidentalis Frey, 1882
- Elachista poae Stainton, 1855
- Elachista rufocinerea (Haworth, 1828)
- Elachista scirpi Stainton, 1887
- Elachista serricornis Stainton, 1854
- Elachista subnigrella Douglas, 1853
- Elachista trapeziella Stainton, 1849
- Elachista utonella Frey, 1856
- Elachista biatomella (Stainton, 1848)
- Perittia obscurepunctella (Stainton, 1848)
- Spuleria flavicaput (Haworth, 1828)
- Stephensia brunnichella (Linnaeus, 1767)

====== Family Gelechiidae (twirler moths) ======
- Acompsia cinerella (Clerck, 1759) (ash-coloured sober)
- Anacampsis populella (Clerck, 1759)
- Anacampsis temerella (Lienig & Zeller, 1846)
- Anarsia spartiella (Schrank, 1802) (Wanstead grey)
- Apodia bifractella (Duponchel, [1843])
- Aproaerema anthyllidella (Hübner, 1813)
- Aristotelia ericinella (Zeller, 1839)
- Athrips mouffetella (Linnaeus, 1758)
- Athrips tetrapunctella (Thunberg, 1794)
- Bryotropha affinis (Haworth, 1828)
- Bryotropha desertella (Douglas, 1850)
- Bryotropha domestica (Haworth, 1828)
- Bryotropha politella (Stainton, 1851)
- Bryotropha senectella (Zeller, 1839)
- Bryotropha similis (Stainton, 1854)
- Bryotropha terrella (Denis & Schiffermüller, 1775)
- Bryotropha umbrosella (Zeller, 1839)
- Carpatolechia decorella (Haworth, 1812)
- Carpatolechia fugitivella (Zeller, 1839) (elm groundling)
- Carpatolechia notatella (Hübner, 1813) (sallow-leaf groundling)
- Carpatolechia proximella (Hübner, 1796)
- Caryocolum alsinella (Zeller, 1868)
- Caryocolum blandella (Douglas, 1852)
- Caryocolum fraternella (Douglas, 1851)
- Caryocolum marmorea (Haworth, 1828)
- Caryocolum tricolorella (Haworth, 1812)
- Caryocolum vicinella (Douglas, 1851)
- Caryocolum viscariella (Stainton, 1855)
- Chionodes distinctella (Zeller, 1839) (eastern groundling)
- Chionodes fumatella (Douglas, 1850) (downland groundling)
- Chrysoesthia sexguttella (Thunberg, 1794)
- Dichomeris marginella (Fabricius, 1781) (juniper webber)
- Eulamprotes atrella (Denis & Schiffermüller, 1775) (two-spotted neb)
- Eulamprotes immaculatella (Douglas, 1850)
- Eulamprotes unicolorella (Duponchel, 1843) (unmarked neb)
- Eulamprotes wilkella (Linnaeus, 1758)
- Exoteleia dodecella (Linnaeus, 1758) (pine bud moth)
- Gelechia rhombella (Denis & Schiffermüller, 1775) (apple groundling)
- Gelechia sororculella (Hübner, 1817) (dark-striped groundling)
- Helcystogramma rufescens (Haworth, 1828)
- Hypatima rhomboidella (Linnaeus, 1758) (lobster-clawed moth)
- Metzneria aestivella (Zeller, 1839)
- Metzneria metzneriella (Stainton, 1851)
- Mirificarma mulinella (Zeller, 1839)
- Monochroa cytisella (Curtis, 1837)
- Monochroa lucidella (Stephens, 1834)
- Monochroa lutulentella (Zeller, 1839) (black neb)
- Monochroa palustrella (Douglas, 1850) (wainscot neb)
- Monochroa suffusella (Douglas, 1850) (notch wing neb)
- Monochroa tenebrella (Hübner, 1817) (common plain neb)
- Neofaculta ericetella (Geyer, 1832)
- Phthorimaea operculella (Zeller, 1873) (potato tuber moth, tobacco splitworm)
- Prolita sexpunctella (Fabricius, 1794) (long-horned flat-back, long-horned groundling)
- Pseudotelphusa paripunctella (Thunberg, 1794)
- Ptocheuusa paupella (Zeller, 1847) (light fleabane neb)
- Recurvaria leucatella (Clerck, 1759) (lesser budmoth, white-barred groundling)
- Scrobipalpa acuminatella (Sircom, 1850)
- Scrobipalpa artemisiella (Treitschke, 1833) (thyme moth)
- Scrobipalpa atriplicella (Fischer von Röslerstamm, 1841) (goosefoot groundling moth)
- Scrobipalpa costella (Humphreys & Westwood, 1845)
- Scrobipalpa instabilella (Douglas, 1846) (saltern groundling)
- Scrobipalpa murinella (Duponchel, 1843)
- Scrobipalpa nitentella (Fuchs, 1902) (common sea groundling)
- Scrobipalpa obsoletella (Fischer von Röslerstamm, 1841) (summer groundling)
- Scrobipalpa ocellatella (Boyd, 1858) (beet moth)
- Scrobipalpa samadensis (Pfaffenzeller, 1870) (buck's-horn groundling)
- Stenolechia gemmella (Linnaeus, 1758) (black-dotted groundling)
- Syncopacma cinctella (Clerck, 1759)
- Syncopacma polychromella (Rebel, 1902)
- Syncopacma sangiella (Stainton, 1863) (brown sober)
- Syncopacma taeniolella (Zeller, 1839)
- Teleiodes luculella (Hübner, [1813]) (crescent groundling)
- Teleiodes vulgella (Denis & Schiffermüller, 1775) (common groundling)
- Teleiodes wagae (Nowicki, 1860) (hazel groundling)
- Teleiopsis diffinis (Haworth, 1828)
- Xenolechia aethiops (Humphreys & Westwood, 1845)

====== Family Depressariidae (flat-bodied moths) ======
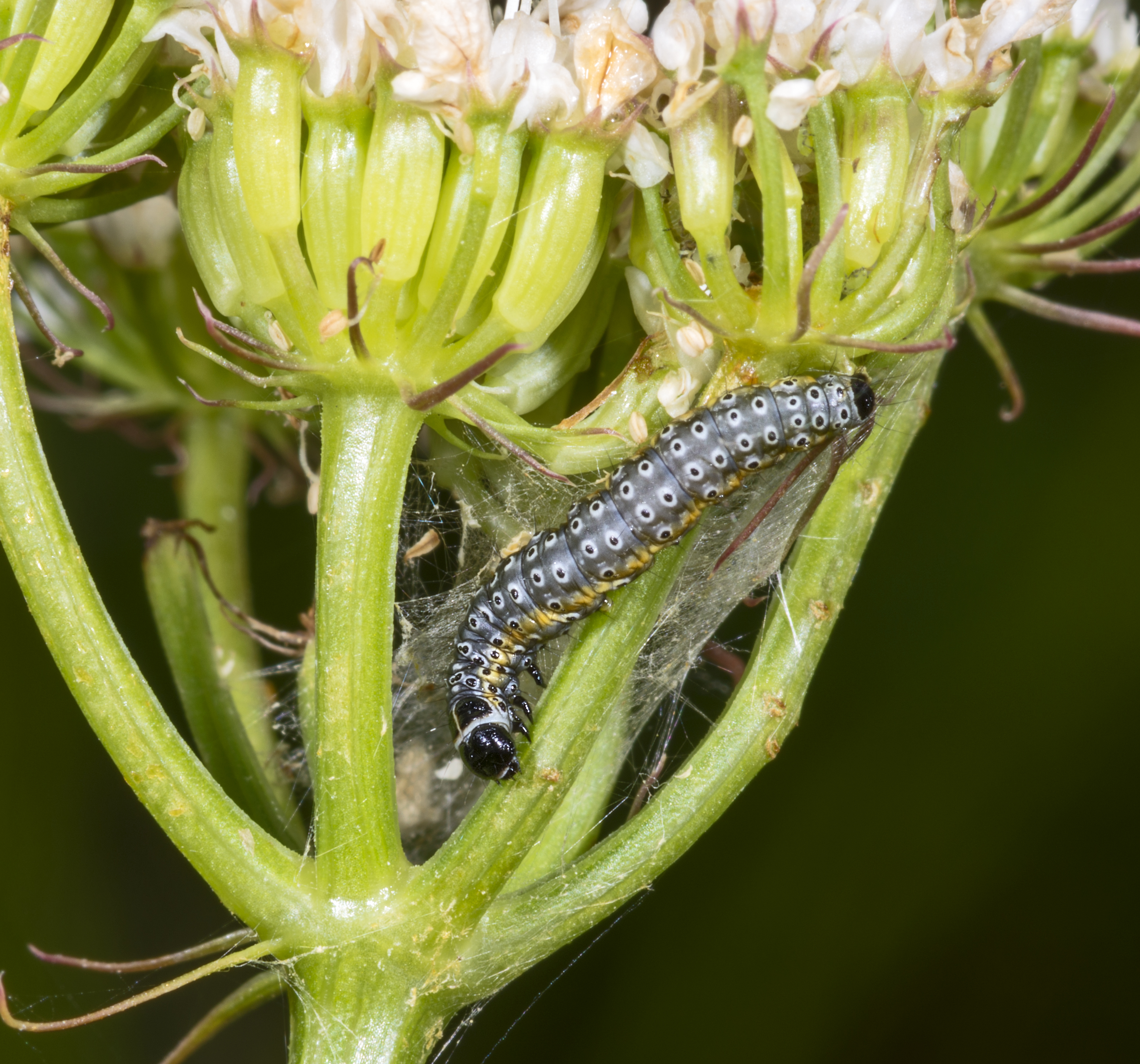
Depressaria daucella larva

- Agonopterix alstroemeriana (Clerck, 1759) (defoliating hemlock moth, poison hemlock moth)
- Agonopterix angelicella (Hübner, 1813)
- Agonopterix arenella (Denis & Schiffermüller, 1775)
- Agonopterix assimilella (Treitschke, 1832)
- Agonopterix astrantiae (Heinemann, 1870)
- Agonopterix capreolella (Zeller, 1839)
- Agonopterix ciliella (Stainton, 1849)
- Agonopterix conterminella (Zeller, 1839)
- Agonopterix heracliana (Linnaeus, 1758)
- Agonopterix kaekeritziana (Linnaeus, 1767)
- Agonopterix liturosa (Haworth, 1811)
- Agonopterix nanatella (Stainton, 1849)
- Agonopterix nervosa (gorse tip moth) (Haworth, 1811)
- Agonopterix ocellana (Fabricius, 1775)
- Agonopterix pallorella (Zeller, 1839)
- Agonopterix propinquella (Treitschke, 1835)
- Agonopterix purpurea (Haworth, 1811)
- Agonopterix rotundella (Douglas, 1846)
- Agonopterix subpropinquella (Stainton, 1849)
- Agonopterix umbellana (Fabricius, 1794) (gorse soft shoot moth)
- Agonopterix yeatiana (Fabricius, 1781)
- Depressaria badiella (Hübner, 1796)
- Depressaria daucella (Denis & Schiffermüller, 1775)
- Depressaria douglasella Stainton, 1849
- Depressaria pulcherrimella Stainton, 1849
- Depressaria radiella (Goeze, 1783) (parsnip moth, parsnip webworm)
- Depressaria ultimella Stainton, 1849
- Exaeretia allisella Stainton, 1849
- Hypercallia citrinalis (Scopoli, 1763)

====== Family Momphidae (mompha moths) ======
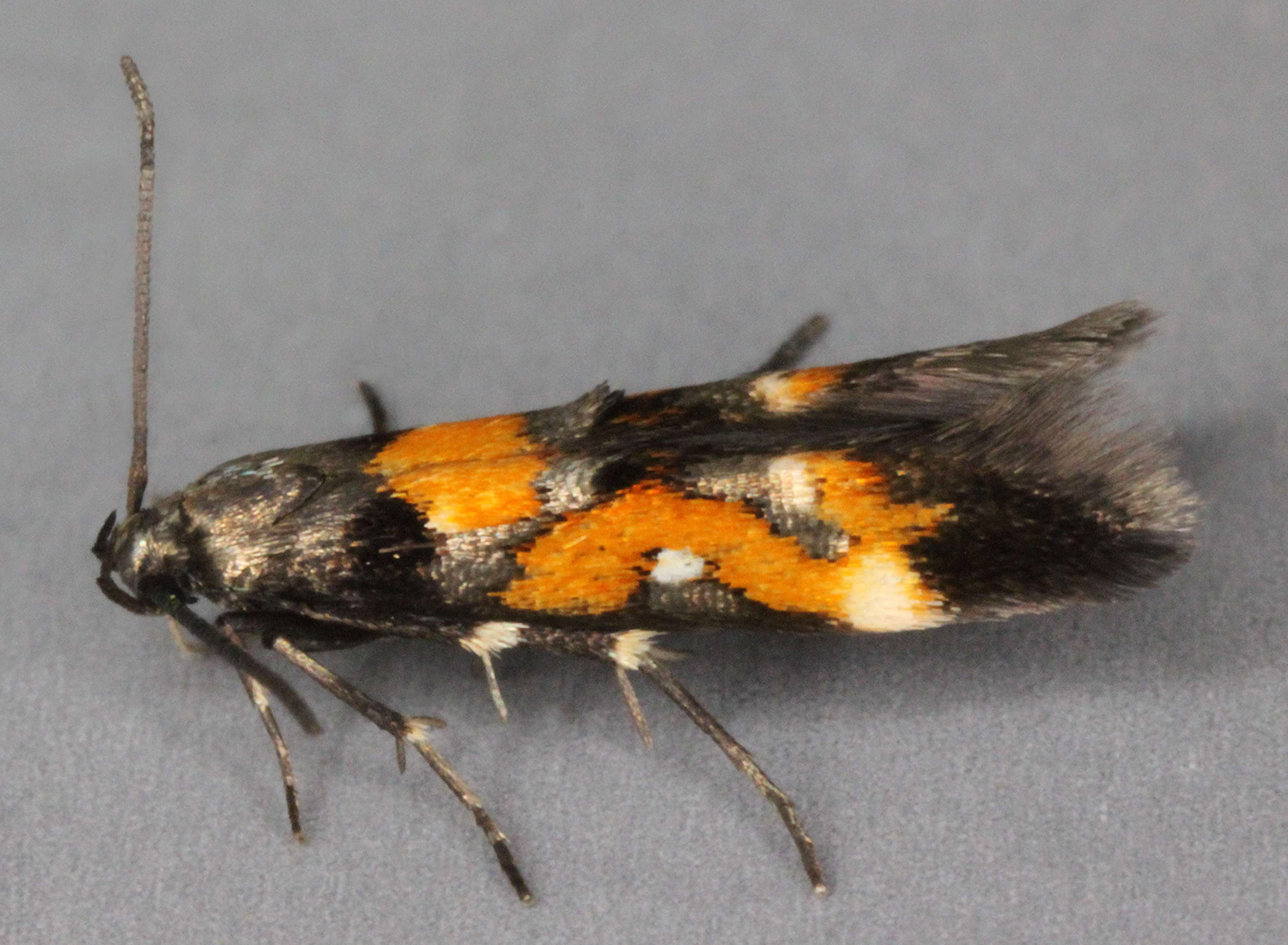
Mompha locupletella

- Mompha langiella (Hübner, 1796)
- Mompha epilobiella (Denis & Schiffermüller, 1775)
- Mompha lacteella (Stephens, 1834)
- Mompha ochraceella (Curtis, 1839)
- Mompha propinquella (Stainton, 1851)
- Mompha subbistrigella (Haworth, 1828) (garden cosmet)
- Mompha locupletella (Denis & Schiffermüller, 1775)
- Mompha raschkiella (Zeller, 1839)
- Mompha terminella (Humphreys & Westwood, 1845)
- Mompha conturbatella (Hübner, [1819]) (fireweed mompha moth)

====== Family Oecophoridae (concealer moths) ======
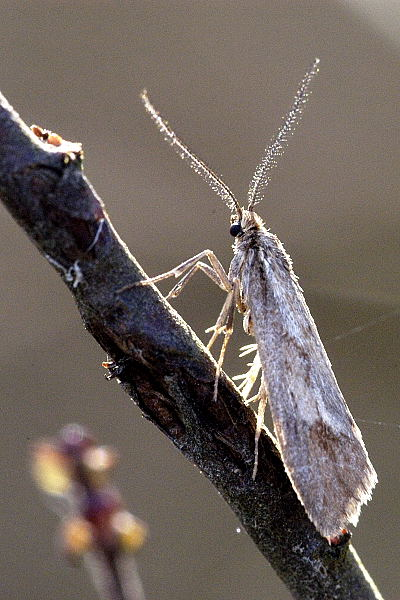
Diurnea lipsiella

- Alabonia geoffrella (Linnaeus, 1767)
- Batia lambdella (Donovan, 1793)
- Borkhausenia fuscescens (Haworth, 1828)
- Borkhausenia minutella (Linnaeus, 1758)
- Dasystoma salicella (Hübner, 1796) (blueberry leafroller)
- Denisia similella (Hübner, 1796)
- Diurnea fagella (Denis & Schiffermüller, 1775) (March dagger moth)
- Diurnea lipsiella (Denis & Schiffermüller, 1775)
- Endrosis sarcitrella (Linnaeus, 1758) (white-shouldered house moth)
- Esperia sulphurella (Fabricius, 1775)
- Hofmannophila pseudospretella (Stainton, 1849) (brown house moth)
- Oegoconia quadripuncta (Haworth, 1828) (four-spotted yellowneck, leaf litter moth)
- Pleurota bicostella (Clerck, 1759)
- Semioscopis avellanella (Hübner, [1793])
- Semioscopis steinkellneriana ([Denis and Schiffermüller], 1775)

====== Family Peleopodidae ======
- Carcina quercana (Fabricius, 1775) (oak lantern, long-horned flat-body, oak-skeletonizer moth)

====== Family Scythrididae (flower moths) ======
- Scythris crassiuscula (Herrich-Schäffer, 1855)
- Scythris grandipennis (Haworth, 1828)
- Scythris picaepennis (Haworth, 1828)

===== Superfamily Copromorphoidea (fruitworm moths) =====
====== Family Alucitidae (many-plumed moths) ======
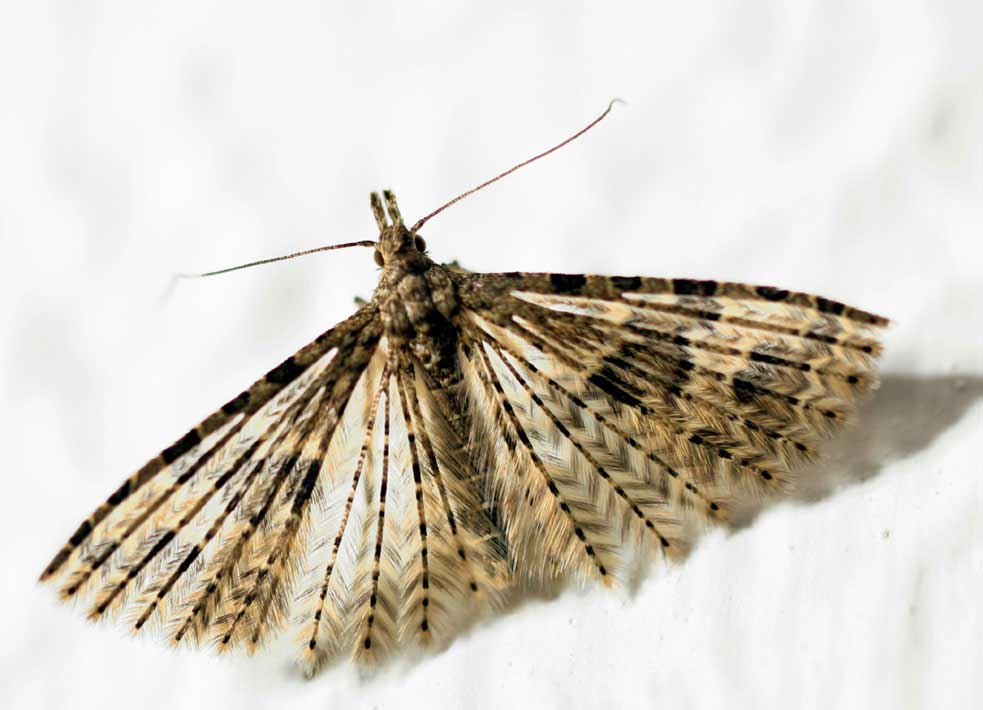
Twenty-plume moth

- Alucita hexadactyla Linnaeus, 1758 (twenty-plume moth)

====== Family Epermeniidae (fringe-tufted moths) ======
- Epermenia aequidentellus (E. Hofmann, 1867)
- Epermenia chaerophyllella (Goeze, 1783)
- Epermenia falciformis (Haworth, 1828)
- Phaulernis fulviguttella (Zeller, 1839) (yellow-spotted lance-wing)

===== Superfamily Yponomeutoidea =====
====== Family Bedelliidae ======
- Bedellia somnulentella (Zeller, 1847) (sweet potato leaf miner, morning-glory leaf miner)

====== Family Glyphipterigidae (sedge moths) ======
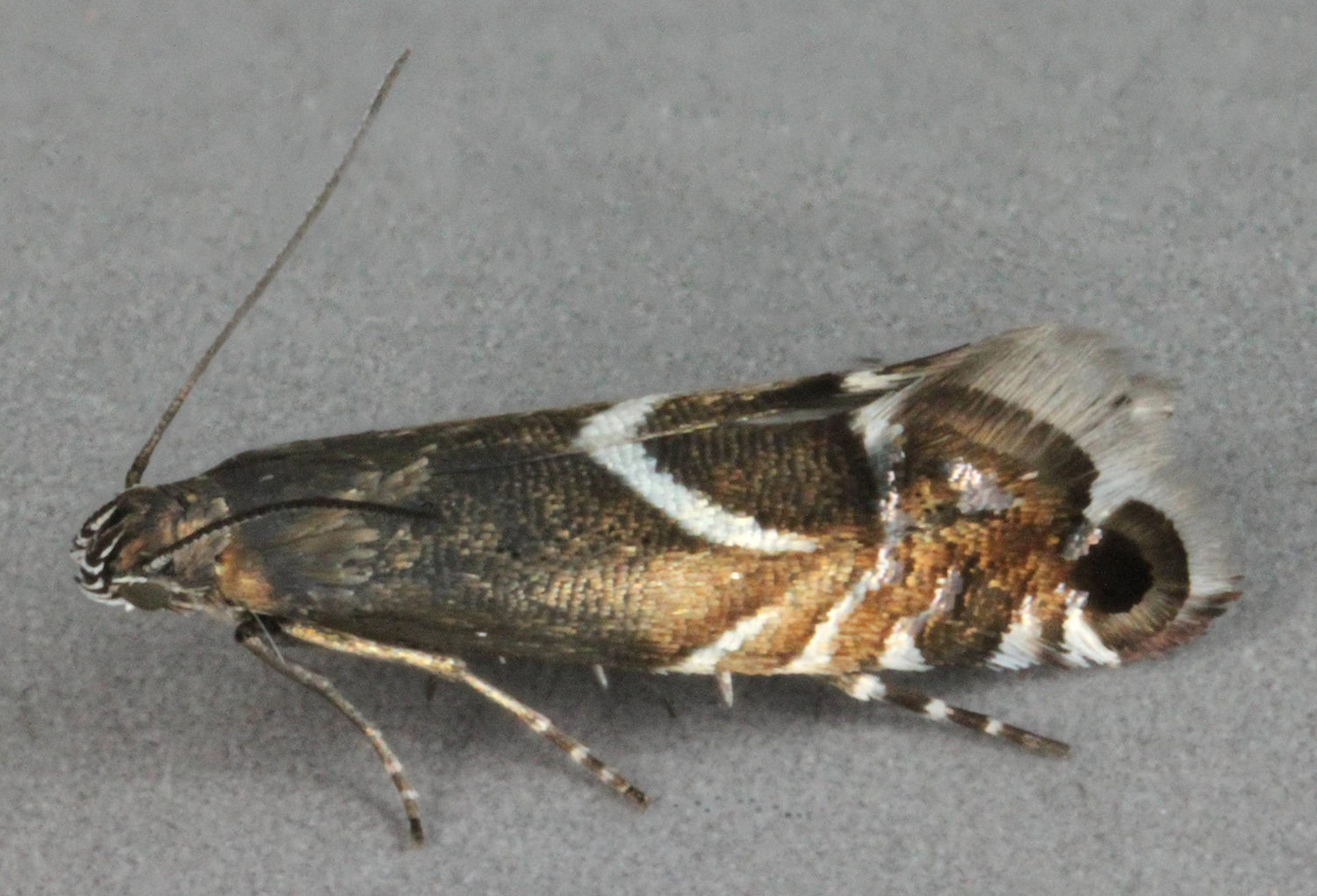
Glyphipterix schoenicolella

- Acrolepia autumnitella Curtis, 1838
- Digitivalva pulicariae (Klimesch, 1956)
- Glyphipterix equitella (Scopoli, 1763)
- Glyphipterix forsterella (Fabricius, 1781)
- Glyphipterix haworthana (Stephens, 1834) (Haworth's glyphipterid moth)
- Glyphipterix schoenicolella Boyd, 1859
- Glyphipterix simpliciella (Stephens, 1834) (cocksfoot moth)
- Glyphipterix thrasonella (Scopoli, 1763)
- Orthotelia sparganella (Thunberg, 1788)

====== Family Lyonetiidae ======
- Leucoptera laburnella (Stainton, 1851) (laburnum leaf miner)
- Leucoptera lotella (Stainton, 1859)
- Leucoptera malifoliella (O. Costa, 1836) (pear leaf blister moth, ribbed apple leaf miner)
- Leucoptera orobi (Stainton, 1869)
- Leucoptera spartifoliella (Hübner, 1813) (Scotch broom twig miner)
- Lyonetia clerkella (Linnaeus, 1758) (apple leaf miner)

====== Family Plutellidae (diamondback moths) ======
- Plutella xylostella (Linnaeus, 1758) (diamondback moth, cabbage moth)
- Plutella porrectella (Linnaeus, 1758)
- Rhigognostis annulatella (Curtis, 1832)
- Rhigognostis incarnatella (Steudel, 1873) (Scotch smudge)
- Rhigognostis senilella (Zetterstedt, 1839) (rock-cress smudge)

====== Family Praydidae ======
- Prays fraxinella Bjerkander, 1784 (ash bud moth)

====== Family Yponomeutidae (ermine moths) ======
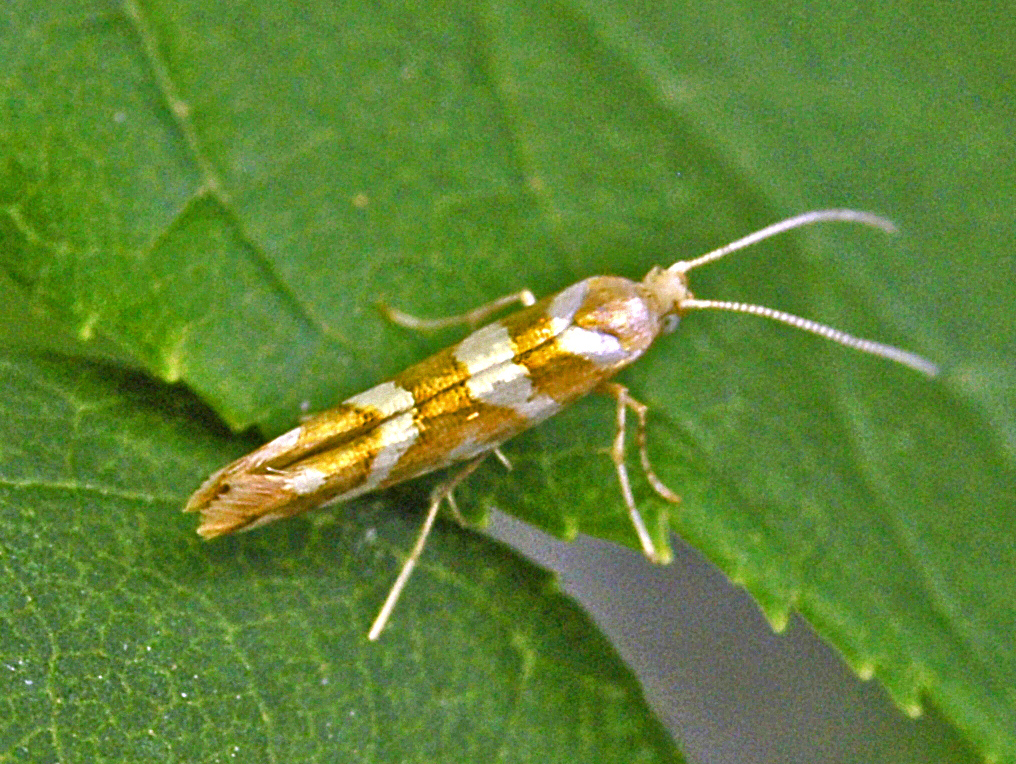
Bronze alder moth

- Argyresthia albistria (Haworth, 1828)
- Argyresthia bonnetella (Linnaeus, 1758)
- Argyresthia brockeella (Hübner, 1813)
- Argyresthia conjugella Zeller, 1839 (apple fruit moth)
- Argyresthia curvella (Linnaeus, 1761) (apple blossom tineid)
- Argyresthia glaucinella Zeller, 1839
- Argyresthia goedartella (Linnaeus, 1758) (bronze alder moth)
- Argyresthia pruniella (Clerck, 1759) (cherry fruit moth, cherry blossom tineid)
- Argyresthia pygmaeella (Denis & Schiffermüller, 1775)
- Argyresthia retinella Zeller, 1839
- Argyresthia semifusca (Haworth, 1828)
- Argyresthia semitestacella (Curtis, 1833)
- Argyresthia sorbiella (Treitschke, 1833)
- Argyresthia spinosella Stainton, 1849
- Argyresthia arceuthina Zeller, 1839
- Argyresthia dilectella Zeller, 1847
- Argyresthia laevigatella Herrich-Schäffer, 1855
- Argyresthia trifasciata Staudinger, 1871 (juniper ermine moth)
- Argyresthia cupressella Walsingham, 1890 (cypress tip moth)
- Cedestis subfasciella (Stephens, 1834)
- Kessleria saxifragae (Stainton, 1868)
- Ocnerostoma friesei Svensson, 1966
- Ocnerostoma piniariella Zeller, 1847
- Paraswammerdamia albicapitella (Scharfenberg, 1805)
- Paraswammerdamia lutarea (Goeze, 1783)
- Pseudoswammerdamia combinella (Hübner, 1786)
- Swammerdamia caesiella (Hübner, 1796)
- Swammerdamia compunctella Herrich-Schäffer, 1855
- Swammerdamia pyrella (Villers, 1789)
- Yponomeuta cagnagella (Hübner, 1813) (spindle ermine)
- Yponomeuta evonymella (Linnaeus, 1758) (bird-cherry ermine)
- Yponomeuta malinellus Zeller, 1838 (apple ermine)
- Yponomeuta padella (Linnaeus, 1758) (orchard ermine, cherry ermine)
- Yponomeuta plumbella (Denis & Schiffermüller, 1775)
- Zelleria hepariella Stainton, 1849

====== Family Ypsolophidae ======
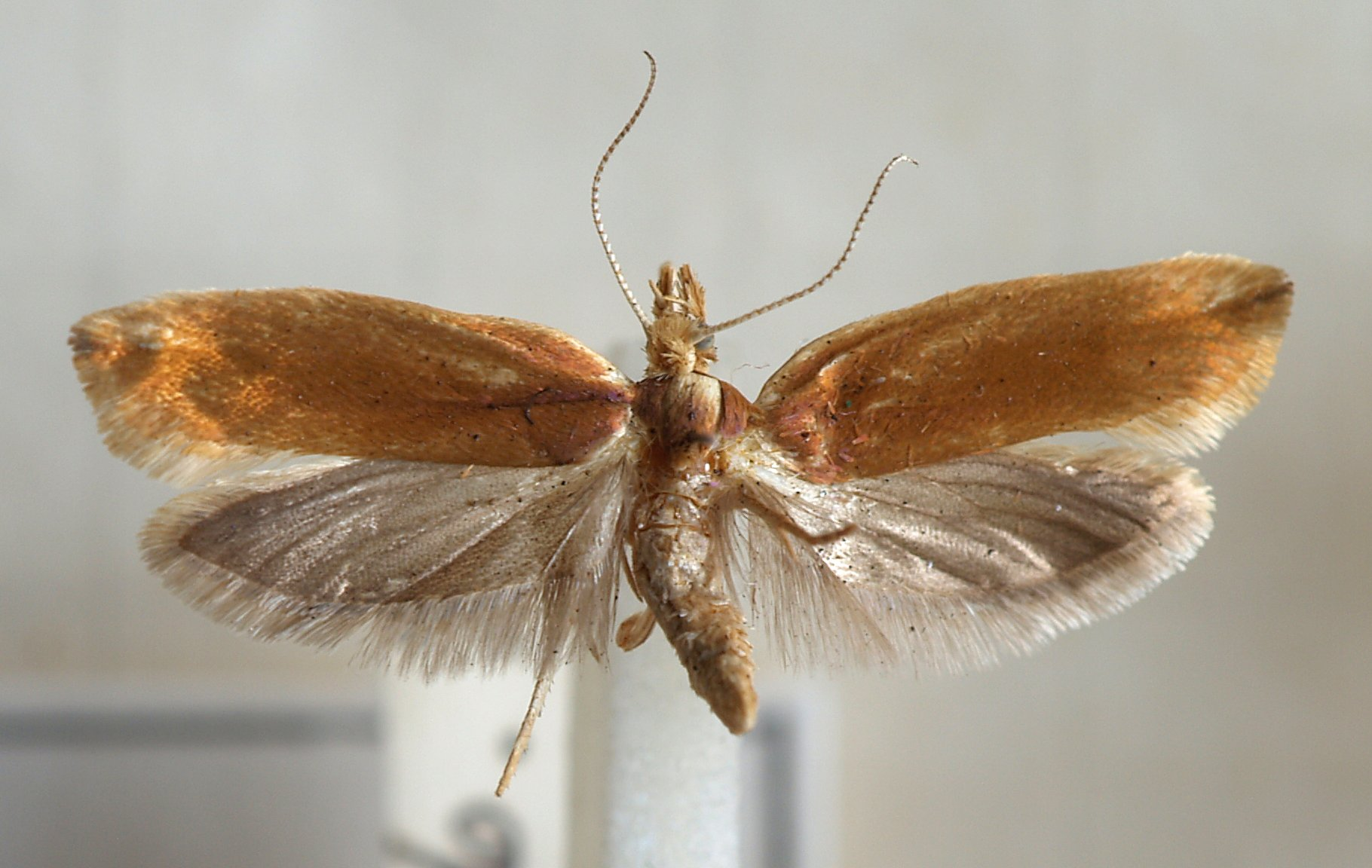
Variable ypsolopha moth

- Ochsenheimeria taurella (Denis & Schiffermüller, 1775) (Liverpool feather-horn)
- Ochsenheimeria urella Fischer von Röslerstamm, 1842
- Ypsolopha dentella (Fabricius, 1775) (honeysuckle moth)
- Ypsolopha mucronella (Scopoli, 1763)
- Ypsolopha nemorella (Linnaeus, 1758)
- Ypsolopha parenthesella (Linnaeus, 1761)
- Ypsolopha scabrella (Linnaeus, 1761) (wainscot hooktip, wainscot smudge)
- Ypsolopha ustella (Clerck, 1759) (variable ypsolopha moth)
- Ypsolopha vittella (Linnaeus, 1758) (elm autumn moth)

===== Superfamily Pyraloidea (pyraloid moths) =====
====== Family Crambidae (grass moths) ======
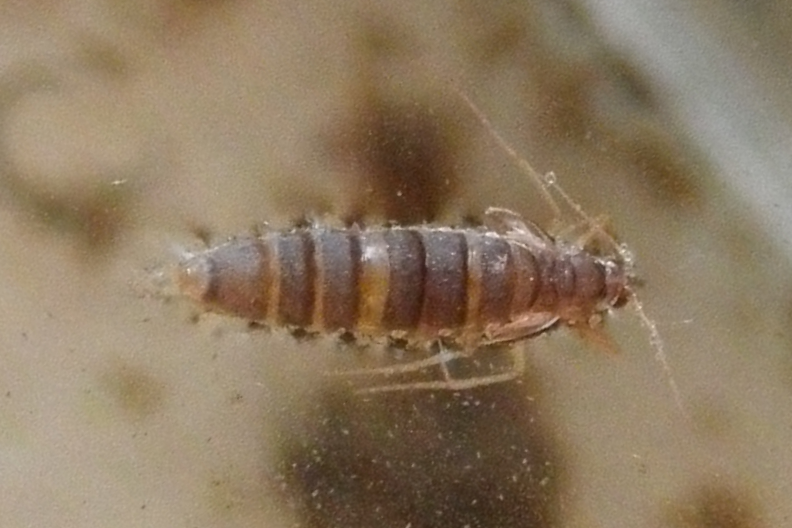
Wingless female watermilfoil moth

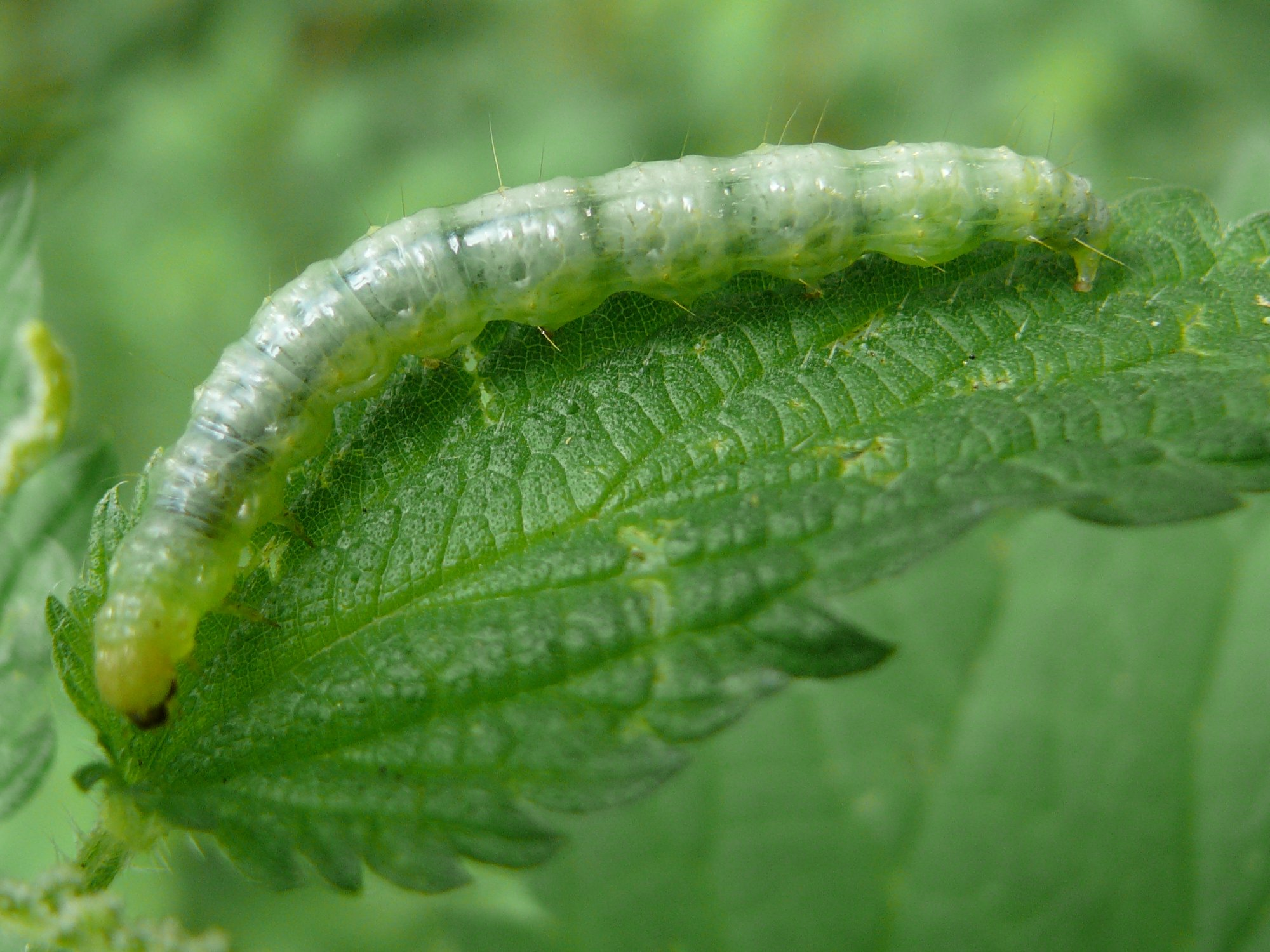
Small magpie moth larva

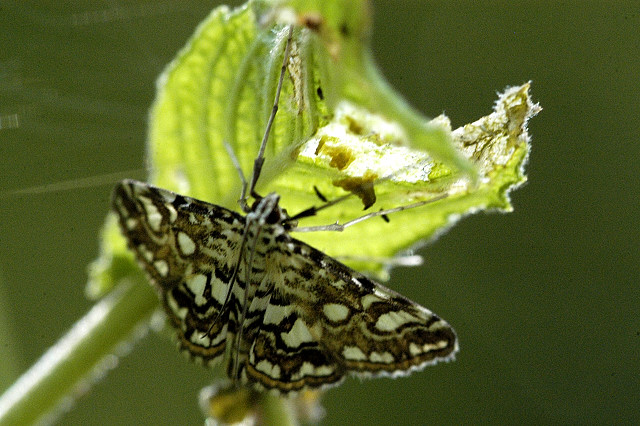
Brown china mark

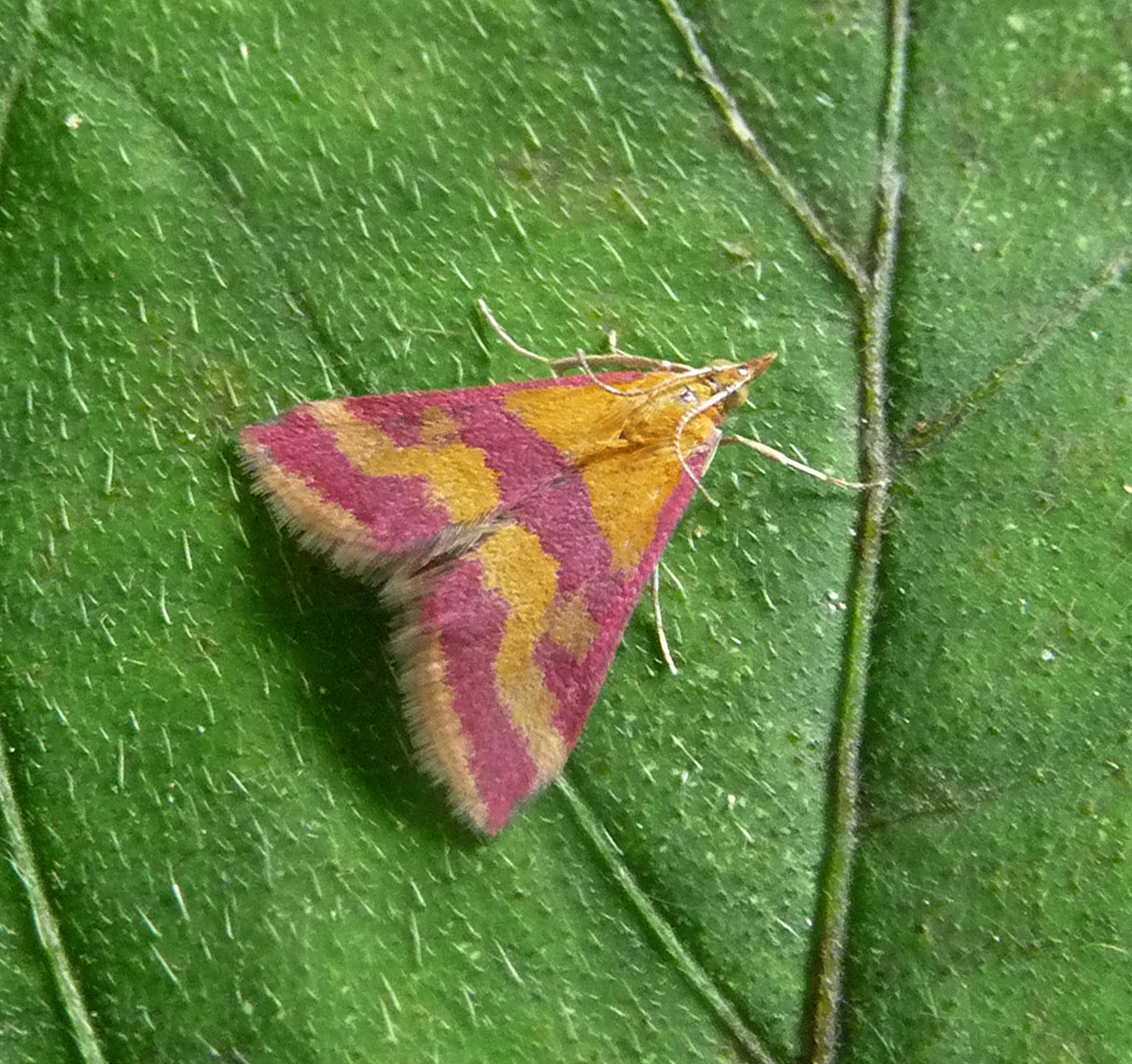
Scarce crimson and gold

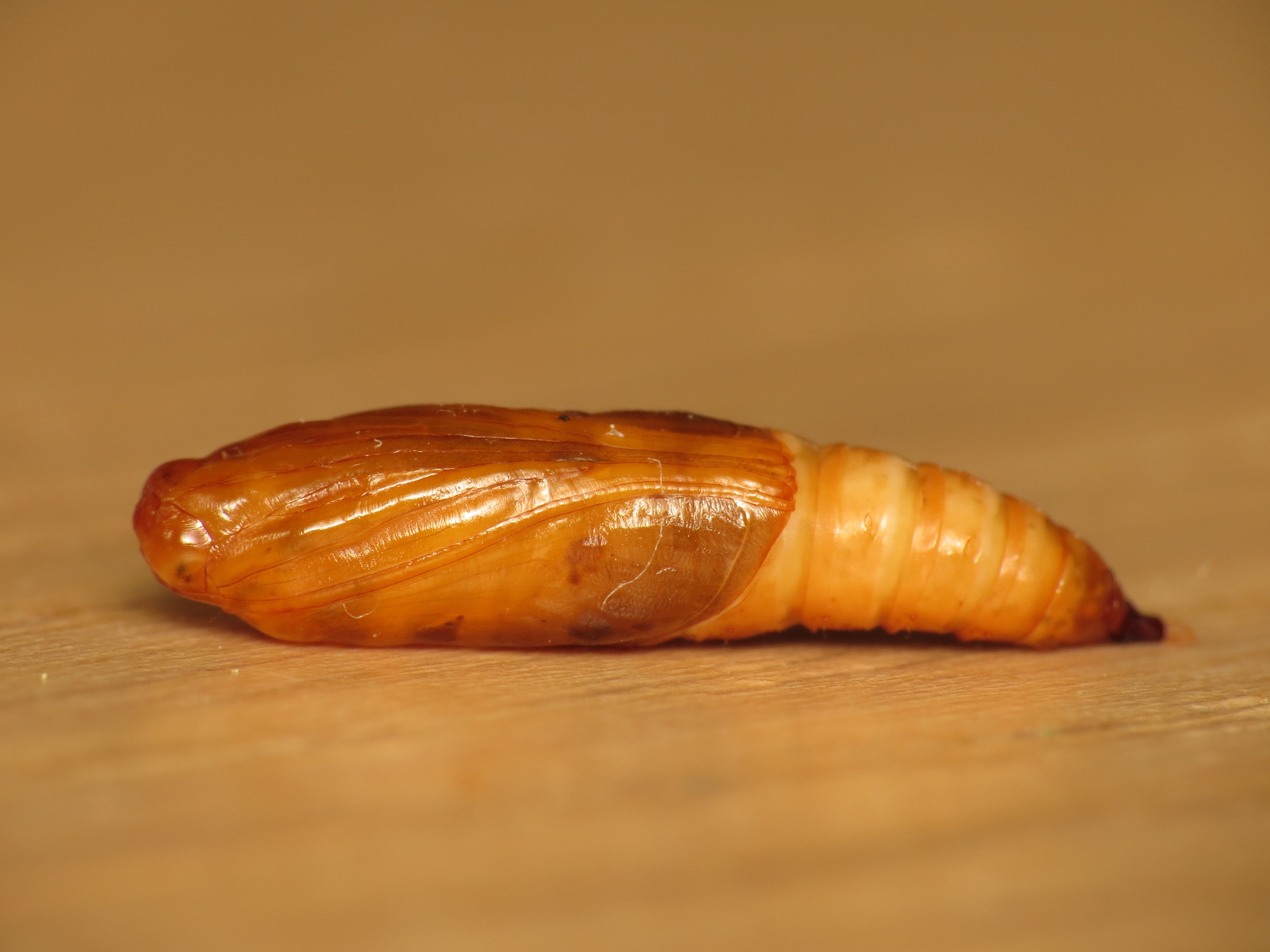
Udea olivalis pupa

- Acentria ephemerella (Denis & Schiffermüller, 1775) (watermilfoil moth, water veneer)
- Agriphila geniculea (Haworth, 1811) (elbow-striped grass-veneer)
- Agriphila inquinatella (Denis & Schiffermüller, 1775)
- Agriphila latistria (Haworth, 1811)
- Agriphila selasella (Hübner, 1813)
- Agriphila straminella (Denis & Schiffermüller, 1775)
- Agriphila tristella (Denis & Schiffermüller, 1775)
- Anania coronata (Hufnagel, 1767) (elderberry pearl, elder pearl, crowned phlyctaenia)
- Anania crocealis (Hübner, 1796)
- Anania funebris (Strom, 1768)
- Anania fuscalis (Denis & Schiffermüller, 1775)
- Anania hortulata (Linnaeus, 1758) (small magpie)
- Anania lancealis (Denis & Schiffermüller, 1775)
- Antigastra catalaunalis (Duponchel, 1833)
- Cataclysta lemnata (Linnaeus, 1758) (small china-mark)
- Catoptria falsella Denis & Schiffermüller, 1775
- Catoptria margaritella (Denis & Schiffermüller, 1775) (pearl-band grass veneer)
- Catoptria pinella (Linnaeus, 1758)
- Catoptria verellus (Zincken, 1817)
- Chilo phragmitella (Hübner, 1805)
- Chrysoteuchia culmella (Linnaeus, 1758) (garden grass-veneer)
- Crambus ericella (Hübner, [1813])
- Crambus hamella (Thunberg, 1788)
- Crambus lathoniellus (Zincken, 1817)
- Crambus pascuella (Linnaeus, 1758)
- Crambus perlella (Scopoli, 1763)
- Crambus pratella (Linnaeus, 1758)
- Crambus silvella (Hübner, 1813)
- Crambus uliginosellus Zeller, 1850
- Cydalima perspectalis (Walker, 1859) (box tree moth)
- Donacaula forficella (Thunberg, 1794)
- Donacaula mucronella (Denis & Schiffermüller, 1775)
- Duponchelia fovealis Zeller, 1847
- Elophila nymphaeata (Linnaeus, 1758) (brown china mark)
- Elophila rivulalis (Duponchel,1834)
- Eudonia angustea (Curtis, 1827)
- Eudonia delunella (Stainton, 1849)
- Eudonia lacustrata (Panzer, 1804)
- Eudonia lineola (Curtis, 1827)
- Eudonia mercurella (Linnaeus, 1758)
- Eudonia pallida (Curtis, 1827)
- Eudonia truncicolella (Stainton, 1849)
- Evergestis extimalis (Scopoli, 1763)
- Evergestis forficalis (Linnaeus, 1758) (garden pebble)
- Evergestis pallidata (Hufnagel, 1767)
- Mecyna asinalis (Hübner, 1819) (madder pearl)
- Nomophila noctuella (Denis & Schiffermüller, 1775) (rush veneer)
- Nymphula nitidulata (Hufnagel, 1767) (beautiful china-mark)
- Ostrinia nubilalis (Hübner, 1796) (European corn borer, European corn worm, European high-flyer)
- Palpita vitrealis (Rossi, 1794) (jasmine moth)
- Parapoynx stratiotata (Linnaeus, 1758) (ringed china-mark)
- Paratalanta pandalis (Hübner, 1825)
- Pediasia aridella (Thunberg, 1788))
- Pediasia contaminella (Hübner, 1796)
- Platytes alpinella (Hübner, 1813)
- Pleuroptya ruralis (Scopoli, 1763) (mother of pearl moth)
- Pyrausta cingulata (Linnaeus, 1758) (silver-barred sable)
- Pyrausta despicata (Scopoli, 1763) (straw-barred pearl)
- Pyrausta ostrinalis (Hübner, 1796)
- Pyrausta purpuralis (Linnaeus, 1758)
- Pyrausta sanguinalis (Linnaeus, 1767) (scarce crimson and gold, scarce purple and gold)
- Loxostege sticticalis (Linnaeus, 1761)
- Scoparia ambigualis (Treitschke, 1829)
- Scoparia pyralella (Denis & Schiffermüller, 1775) (meadow grey)
- Scoparia subfusca Haworth, 1811
- Thisanotia chrysonuchella (Scopoli, 1763)
- Udea lutealis (Hübner, 1809)
- Udea olivalis (Denis & Schiffermüller, 1775)
- Udea prunalis (Denis & Schiffermüller, 1775)
- Udea uliginosalis (Stephens, 1834)
- Uresiphita gilvata (Fabricius, 1794)

====== Family Pyralidae (snout moths, grass moths) ======
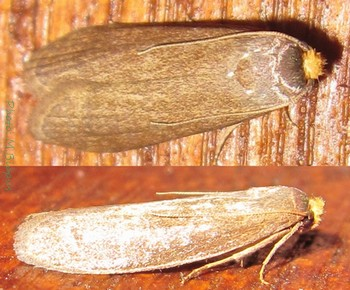
Lesser wax moth

- Achroia grisella (Fabricius, 1794) (lesser wax moth)
- Acrobasis advenella (Zincken, 1818)
- Acrobasis consociella (Hübner, 1813)
- Aglossa pinguinalis (Linnaeus, 1758) (large tabby, grease moth)
- Anerastia lotella (Hübner, 1813)
- Aphomia sociella (Linnaeus, 1758) (bee moth, bumble bee wax moth)
- Cadra calidella (Guenee, 1845) (dried fruit, date moth)
- Cadra cautella (Walker, 1863) (almond moth, tropical warehouse moth)
- Cryptoblabes bistriga (Haworth, 1811)
- Delplanqueia dilutella (Denis & Schiffermüller, 1775)
- Dioryctria abietella (Denis & Schiffermüller, 1775)
- Ephestia elutella (Hübner, 1796) (cacao moth, tobacco moth, warehouse moth)
- Ephestia kuehniella Zeller, 1879 (Mediterranean flour moth, mill moth)
- Etiella zinckenella (Treitschke, 1832) (pulse pod borer moth)
- Galleria mellonella (Linnaeus, 1758) (greater wax moth, honeycomb moth)
- Hellula undalis (Fabricius, 1781) (cabbage webworm, Old World webworm)
- Homoeosoma nebulella (Denis & Schiffermüller, 1775) (Eurasian sunflower moth)
- Homoeosoma nimbella (Duponchel, 1837)
- Hypsopygia costalis (Fabricius, 1775)) (gold triangle, clover hay moth)
- Hypsopygia glaucinalis (Linnaeus, 1758)
- Matilella fusca (Haworth, 1811)
- Nephopterix angustella (Hübner, 1796)
- Euzophera pinguis (Haworth, 1811) (tabby knot-horn)
- Oncocera semirubella (Scopoli, 1763)
- Pempelia palumbella (Denis & Schiffermüller, 1775)
- Pempeliella ornatella (Denis & Schiffermüller, 1775)
- Phycita roborella (Denis & Schiffermüller, 1775)
- Phycitodes binaevella (Hübner, 1813)
- Phycitodes saxicola (small clouded knot-horn) (Vaughan, 1870)
- Plodia interpunctella (Hübner, 1813) (Indianmeal moth, weevil moth, pantry moth, flour moth, grain moth)
- Pyralis farinalis (Linnaeus, 1758) (meal moth)

===== Superfamily Pterophoroidea =====
====== Family Pterophoridae (plume moths) ======
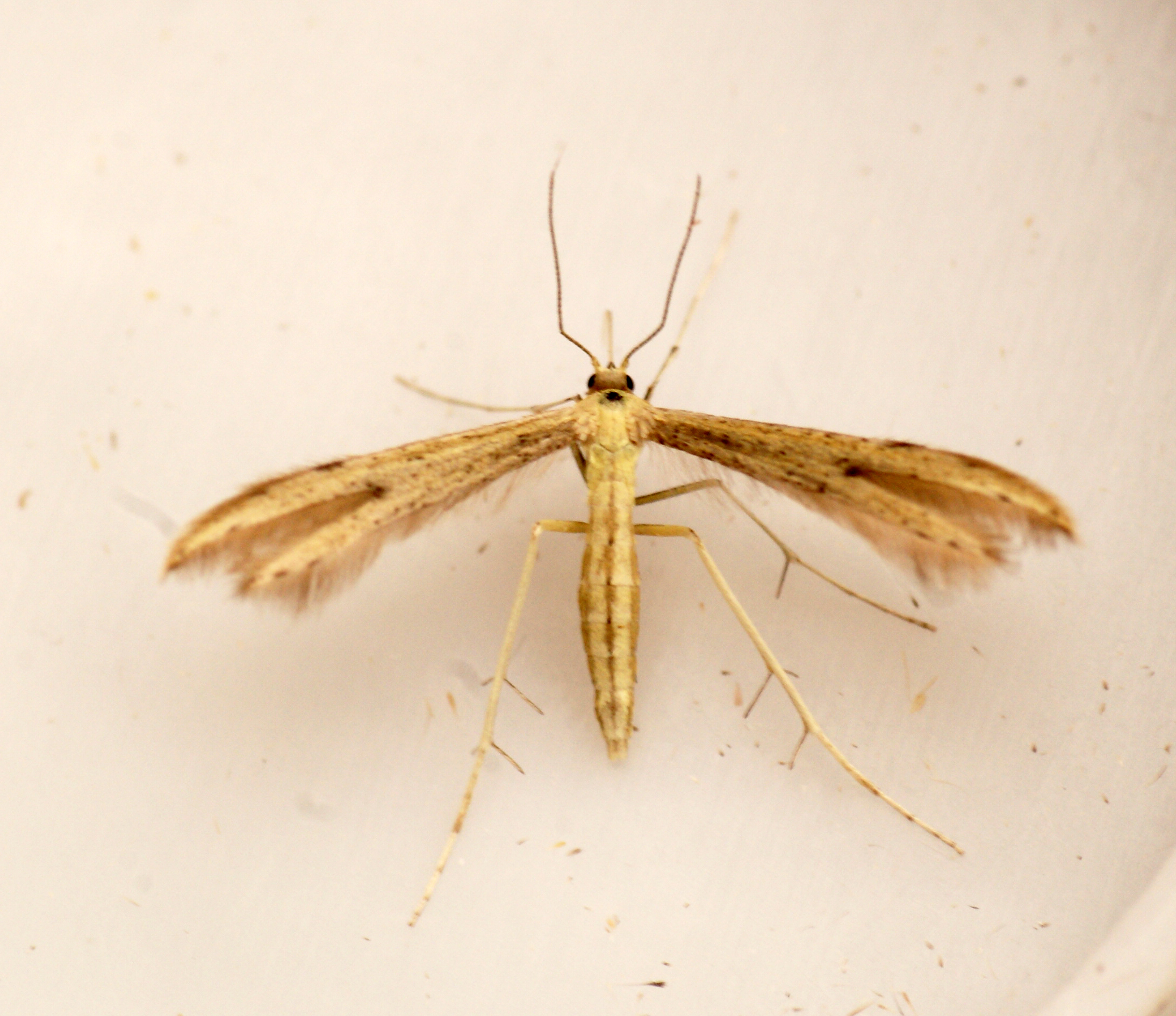
Adaina microdactyla

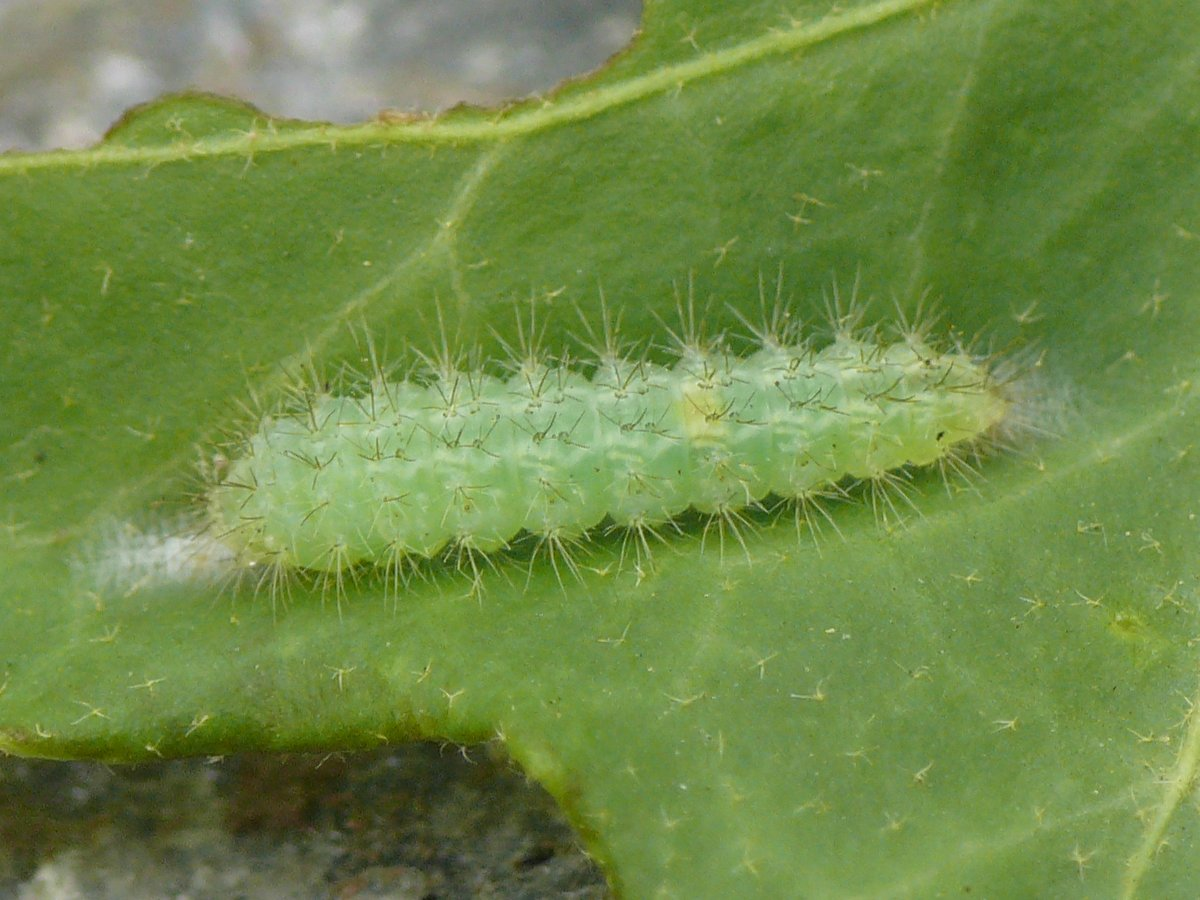
Morning-glory plume moth caterpillar

- Adaina microdactyla (Hübner, 1813)
- Amblyptilia acanthadactyla (Hübner, 1813)
- Amblyptilia punctidactyla (Haworth, 1811)
- Capperia britanniodactylus (Gregson, 1867)
- Crombrugghia laetus (Zeller, 1847)
- Emmelina monodactyla (Linnaeus, 1758) (T-moth, morning-glory plume moth)
- Gillmeria pallidactyla (Haworth, 1811)
- Hellinsia tephradactyla (Hübner, 1813)
- Merrifieldia leucodactyla (Denis & Schiffermüller, 1775)
- Merrifieldia tridactyla (Linnaeus, 1758)
- Oidaematophorus lithodactyla (Treitschke, 1833)
- Oxyptilus parvidactyla (Haworth, 1811)
- Platyptilia calodactyla (Denis & Schiffermüller, 1775)
- Platyptilia gonodactyla (Denis & Schiffermüller, 1775) (triangle plume)
- Platyptilia isodactylus (Zeller, 1852) (ragwort crown-boring plume moth)
- Platyptilia tesseradactyla (Linnaeus, 1761)
- Pterophorus pentadactyla (Linnaeus, 1758) (white plume moth)
- Stenoptilia bipunctidactyla (Scopoli, 1763)
- Stenoptilia millieridactylus (Bruand, 1861)
- Stenoptilia pterodactyla (Linnaeus, 1761)
- Stenoptilia zophodactylus (Duponchel, 1840)

===== Superfamily Choreutoidea =====
====== Family Choreutidae (metalmark moths) ======
- Anthophila fabriciana (Linnaeus, 1767) (common nettle-tap)
- Prochoreutis myllerana (Fabricius, 1794) (Miller’s nettle-tap)
- Prochoreutis sehestediana (Fabricius, 1776)
- Tebenna micalis (Mann, 1857) (small thistle moth)

===== Superfamily Sesioidea =====
====== Family Sesiidae (clearwing moths) ======
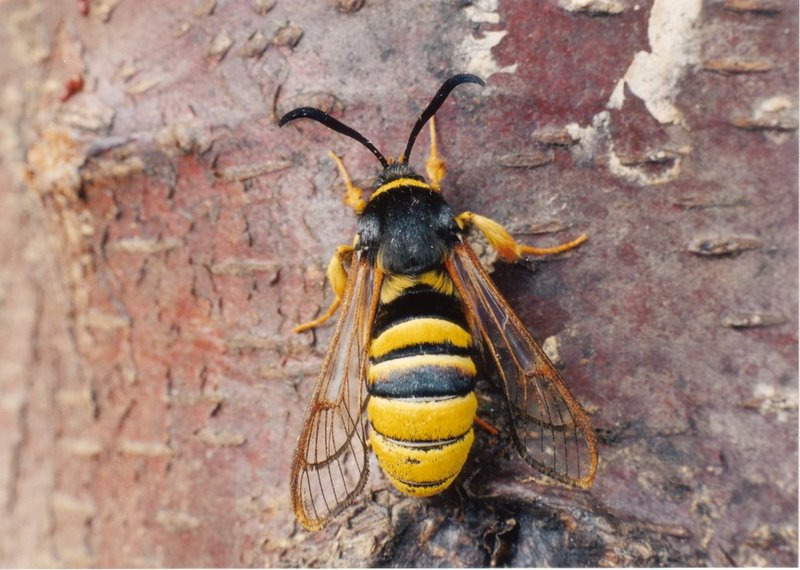
Lunar hornet moth

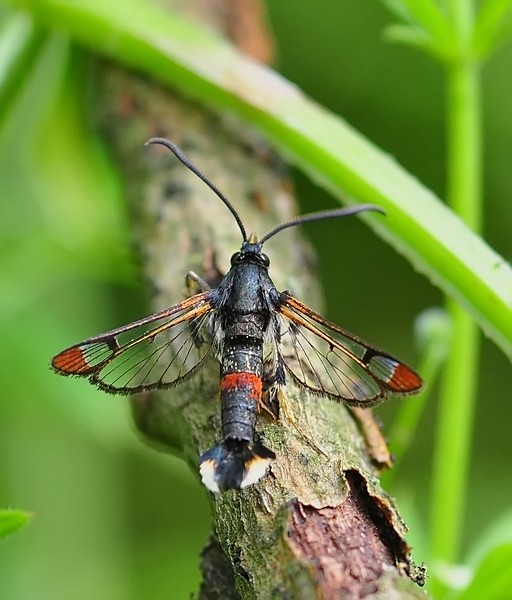
Red-tipped clearwing

- Pyropteron muscaeforme (Esper, 1783) (thrift clearwing)
- Sesia apiformis (Clerck, 1759) (hornet moth, hornet clearwing)
- Sesia bembeciformis (Hübner, 1806) (lunar hornet moth)
- Synanthedon formicaeformis (Esper, 1783) (red-tipped clearwing)
- Synanthedon scoliaeformis (Borkhausen, 1789) (Welsh clearwing)
- Synanthedon tipuliformis (Clerck, 1759) (currant clearwing)

===== Superfamily Zygaenoidea (burnet moths, forester moths, smoky moths) =====
====== Family Zygaenidae ======
- Adscita statices (Linnaeus, 1758) (green forester)
- Zygaena purpuralis (Brünnich, 1763) (transparent burnet)
- Zygaena filipendulae (Linnaeus, 1758) (six-spot burnet)
- Zygaena lonicerae (Scheven, 1777) (narrow-bordered five-spot burnet)

==== Section Cossina ====
===== Superfamily Cossoidea (carpenter moths and relatives) =====
====== Family Cossidae (cossid millers, carpenter millers) ======
- Cossus cossus (Linnaeus, 1758) (goat moth)

===== Superfamily Tortricoidea =====
====== Family Tortricidae (tortrix moths, leafroller moths) ======
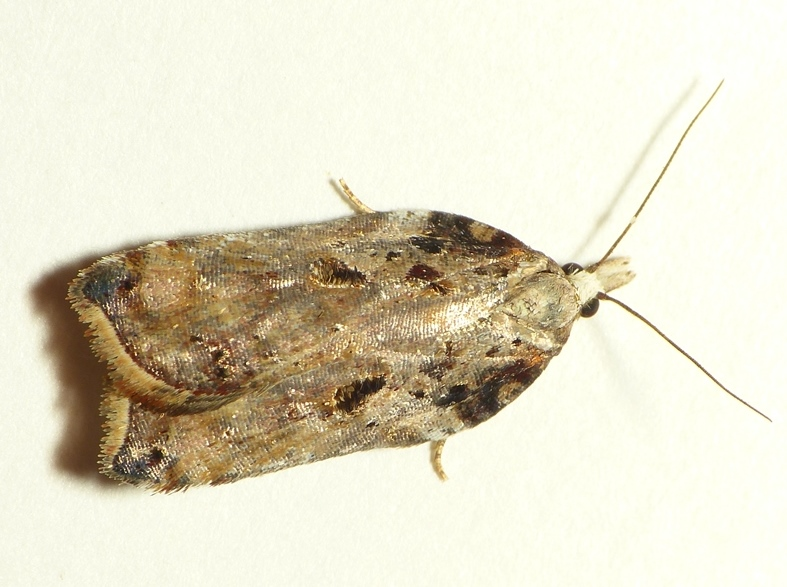
rufous-margined button moth

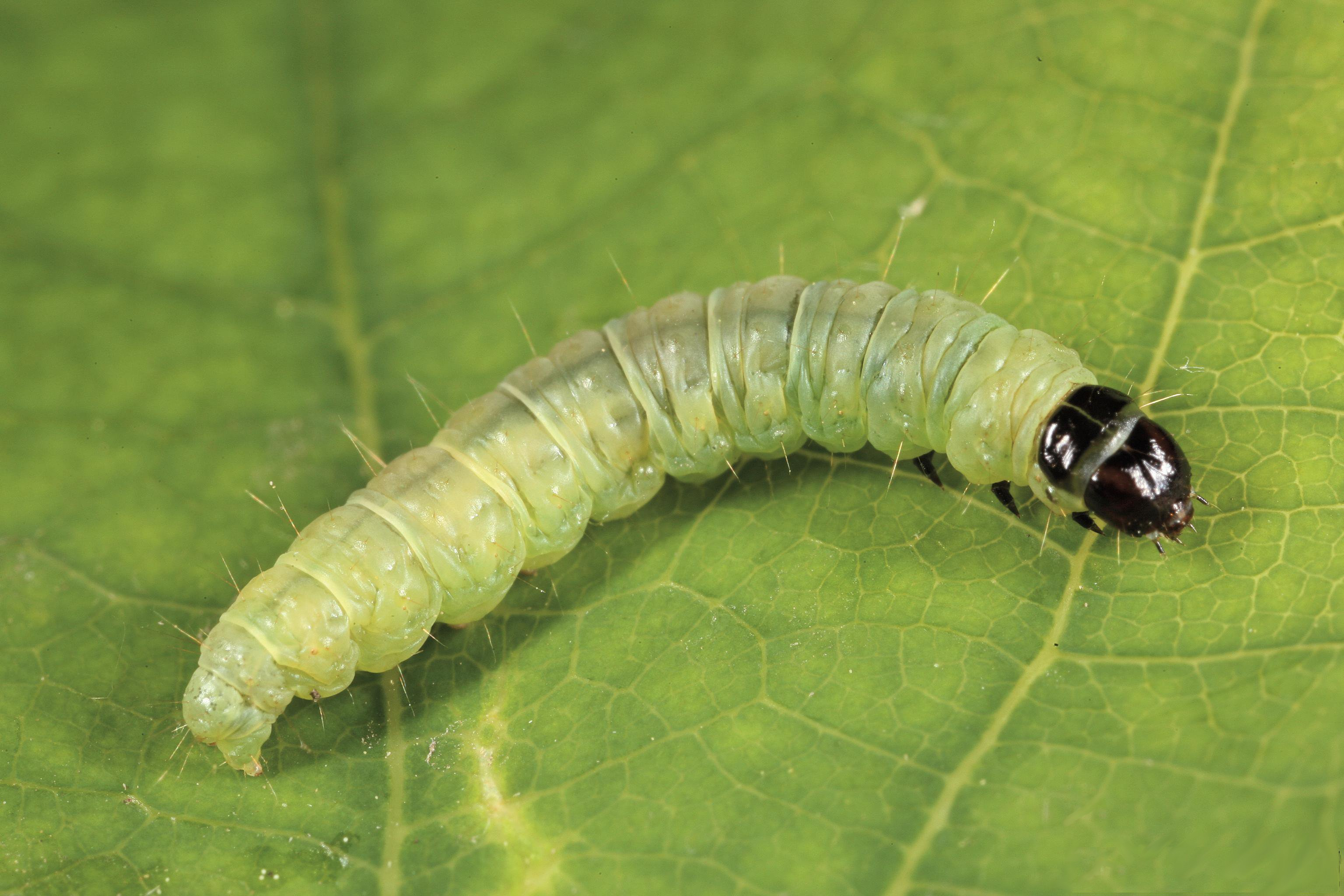
Acleris ferrugana larva

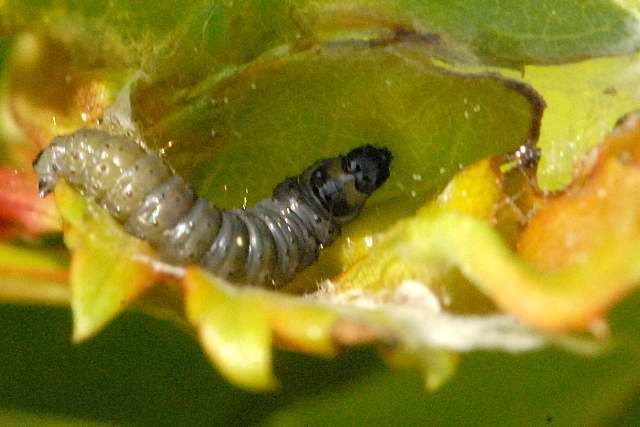
Ancylis achatana larva

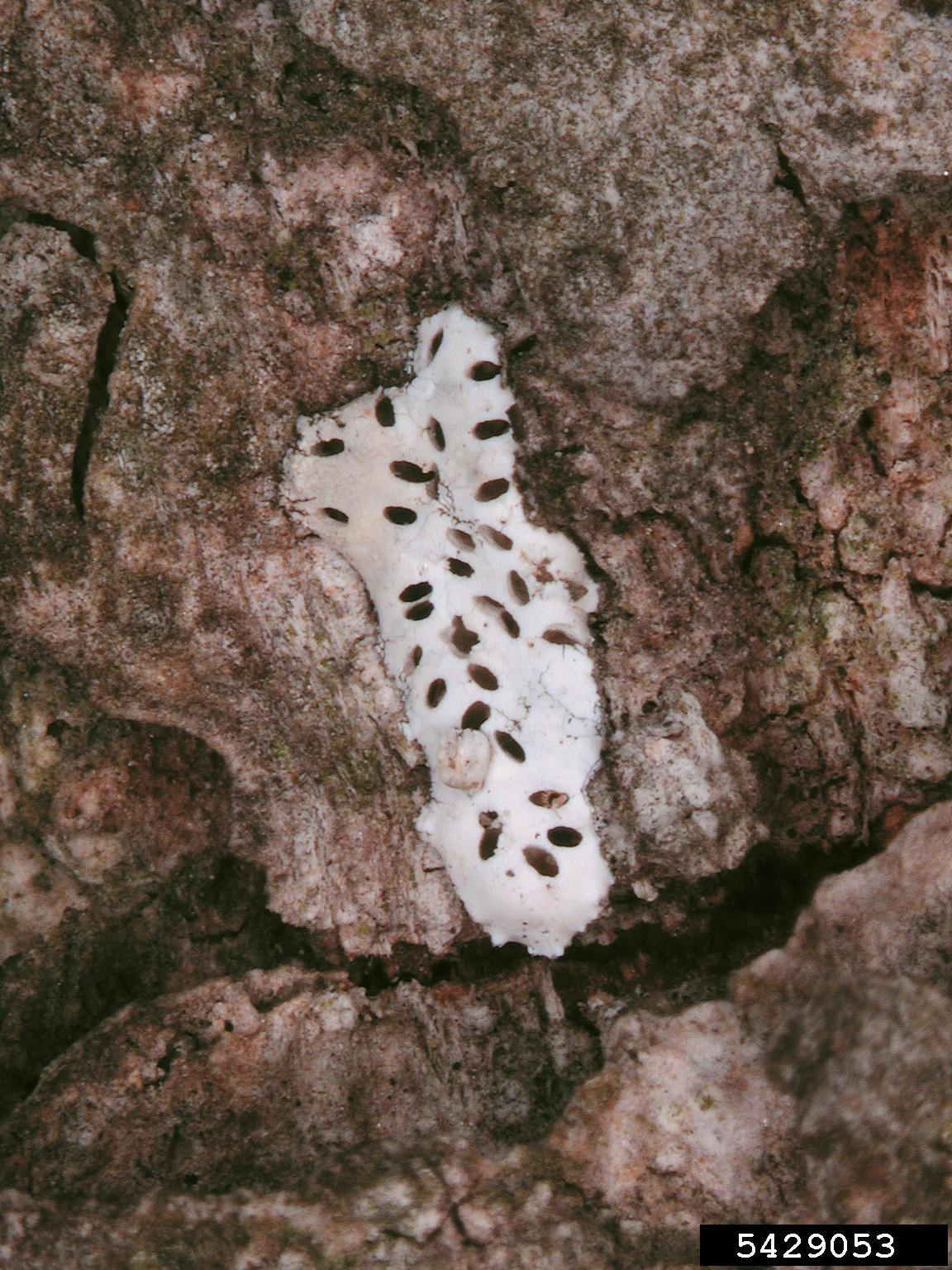
Brown oak tortrix eggs

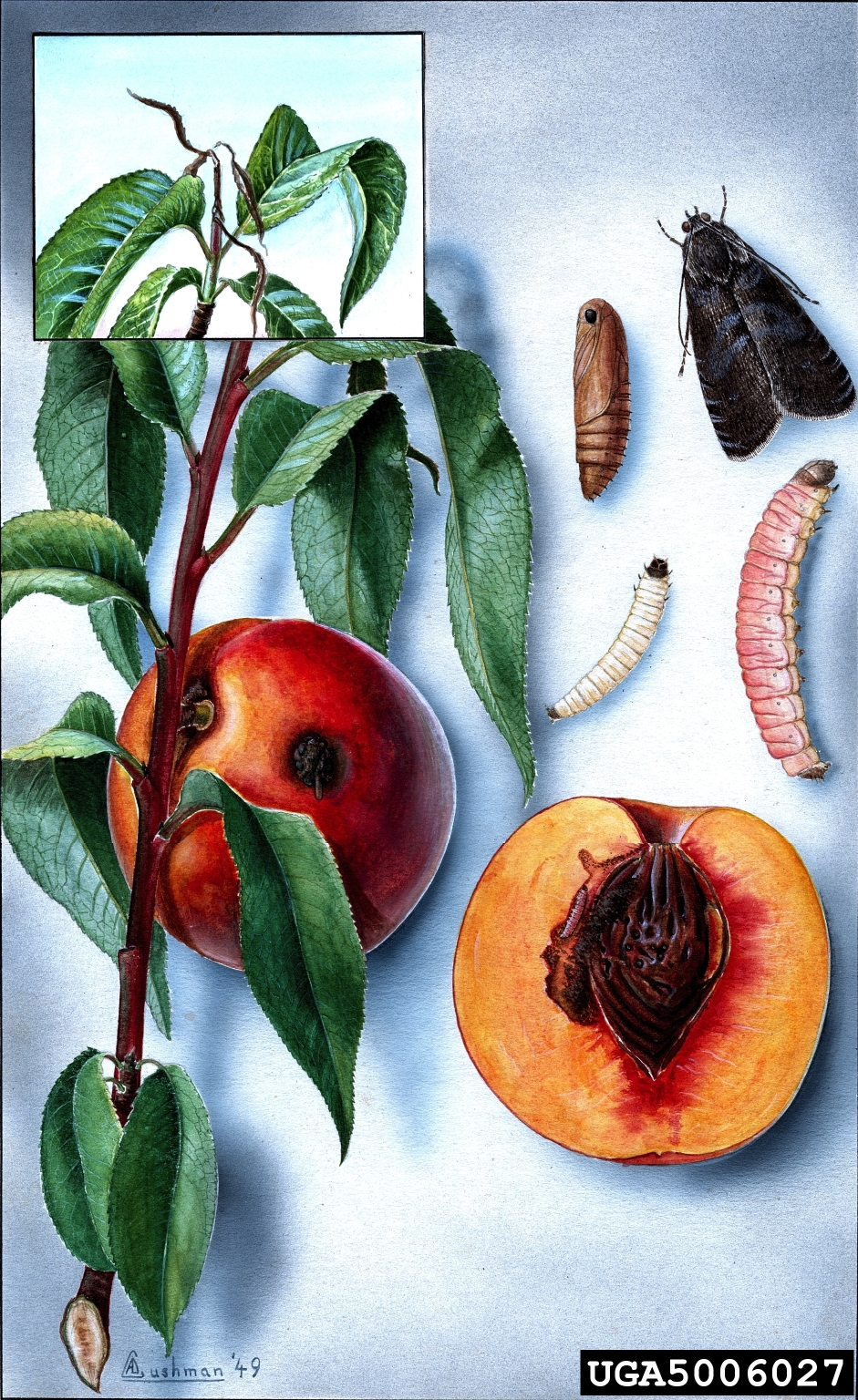
Life cycle of the Oriental fruit moth, recently recorded in Ireland

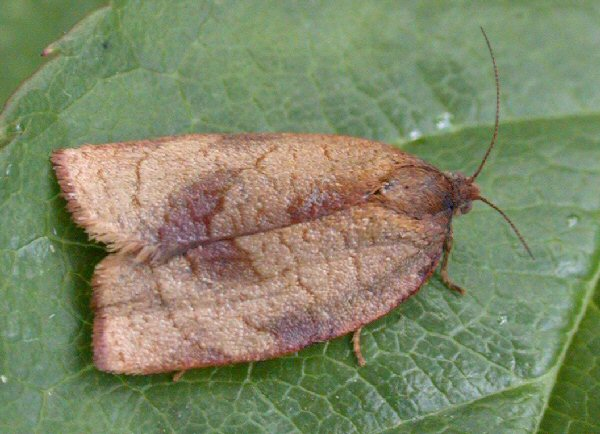
Lozotaenia forsterana

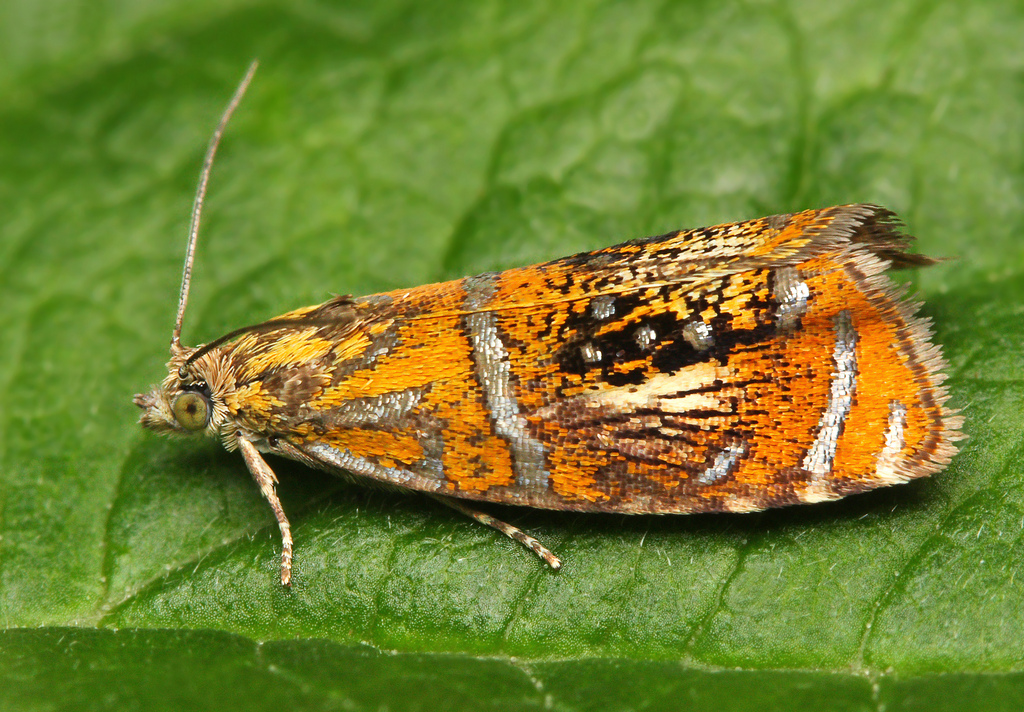
Arched marble

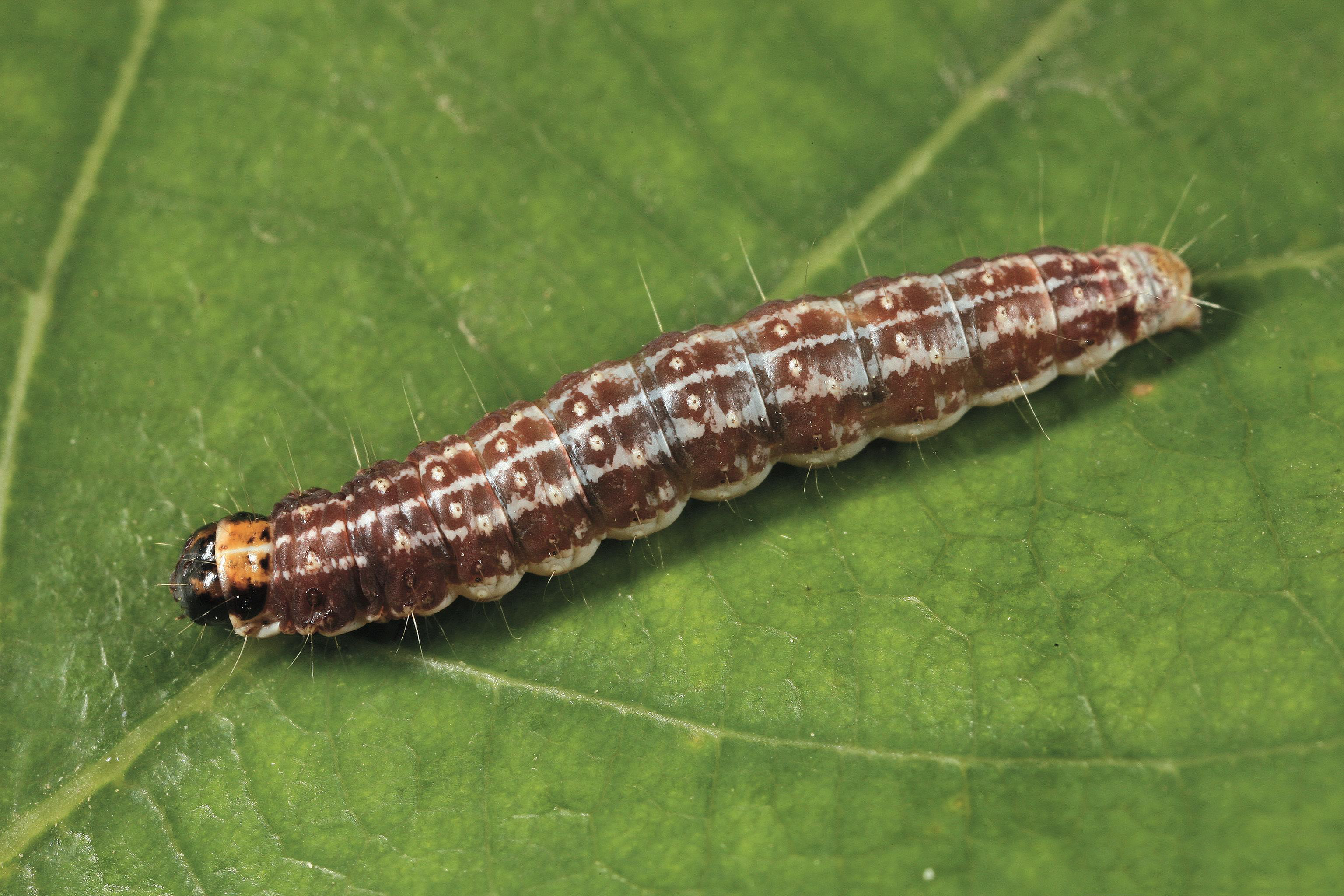
Tortricodes alternella larva

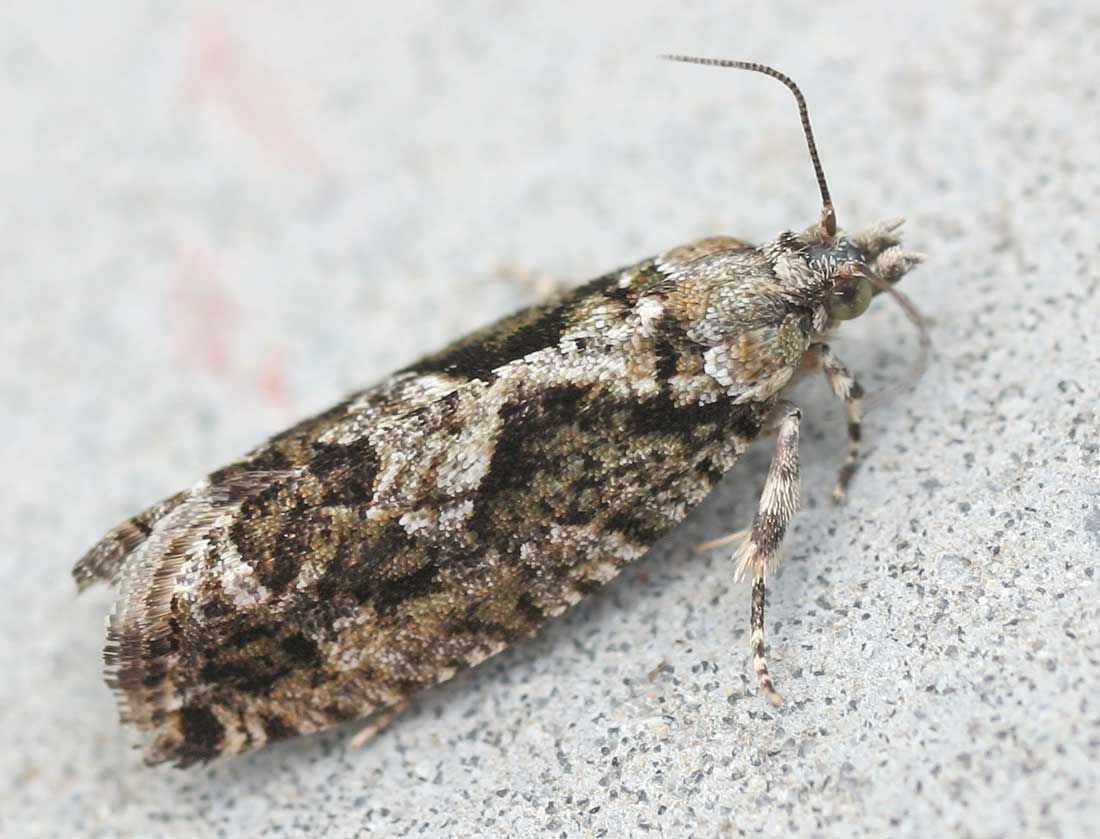
Zeiraphera isertana

- Acleris abietana (Hübner, 1822) (Perth button)
- Acleris aspersana (Hübner, 1817) (ginger button)
- Acleris bergmanniana (Linnaeus, 1758) (yellow rose button moth)
- Acleris caledoniana (Stephens, 1852) (Caledonian button)
- Acleris comariana (Lienig & Zeller, 1846) (strawberry tortrix)
- Acleris cristana (Denis & Schiffermüller, 1775) (rufous-margined button moth)
- Acleris effractana (Hübner, [1799]) (hook-winged tortrix moth)
- Acleris emargana (Fabricius, 1775) (notched-winged tortricid)
- Acleris ferrugana (Denis & Schiffermüller, 1775)
- Acleris forsskaleana (Linnaeus, 1758) (maple leaftier moth)
- Acleris hastiana (Linnaeus, 1758)
- Acleris holmiana (Linnaeus, 1758) (golden leafroller moth)
- Acleris hyemana (Haworth, 1811)
- Acleris laterana (Fabricius, 1794)
- Acleris literana (Linnaeus, 1758) (sprinkled rough-wing)
- Acleris notana (Donovan, 1806)
- Acleris permutana (Duponchel, 1836)
- Acleris rhombana (Denis & Schiffermüller, 1775) (rhomboid tortrix)
- Acleris rufana (Denis & Schiffermüller, 1775)
- Acleris schalleriana (Linnaeus, 1761) (viburnum button, Schaller's acleris moth)
- Acleris sparsana (Denis & Schiffermüller, 1775)
- Acleris variegana (Denis & Schiffermüller, 1775) (garden rose tortricid moth, fruit tortricid)
- Aethes cnicana (Westwood, 1854)
- Aethes francillana (Fabricius, 1794) (long-barred yellow conch)
- Aethes piercei Obraztsov, 1952 (devil's-bit conch)
- Aethes rubigana (Treitschke, 1830) (burdock conch)
- Agapeta hamana (Linnaeus, 1758)
- Agapeta zoegana (Linnaeus, 1767) (sulphur knapweed moth, yellow-winged knapweed root moth)
- Aleimma loeflingiana (Linnaeus, 1758)
- Ancylis achatana (Denis & Schiffermüller, 1775)
- Ancylis badiana (Denis & Schiffermüller, 1775)
- Ancylis geminana (Donovan, 1806) (festooned roller)
- Ancylis diminutana (Haworth, 1811) (small festooned roller)
- Ancylis mitterbacheriana (Denis & Schiffermüller, 1775)
- Ancylis myrtillana (Treitschke, 1830)
- Ancylis obtusana (Haworth, 1811) (small buckthorn roller)
- Ancylis uncella (Denis & Schiffermüller, 1775)
- Ancylis unguicella (Linnaeus, 1758)
- Aphelia viburnana (Denis & Schiffermüller, 1775) (bilberry tortrix)
- Aphelia paleana (Hübner, 1793) (timothy tortrix)
- Aphelia unitana (Hübner, 1799)
- Apotomis betuletana (Haworth, 1811)
- Apotomis capreana (Hübner, 1817)
- Apotomis semifasciana (Haworth, 1811) (short-barred grey marble)
- Apotomis sauciana (Frölich, 1828) (Sutherland long-cloak or Greville's marble)
- Apotomis sororculana (Zetterstedt, 1839)
- Apotomis turbidana Hübner, 1825
- Archips crataegana (Hübner, 1799) (brown oak tortrix)
- Archips podana (Scopoli, 1763) (large fruit-tree tortrix)
- Archips rosana (Linnaeus, 1758) (rose tortrix)
- Archips xylosteana (Linnaeus, 1758) (variegated golden tortrix, brown oak tortrix)
- Argyroploce arbutella (Linnaeus, 1758)
- Argyrotaenia ljungiana (Thunberg, 1797)
- Bactra furfurana (mottled marble) (Haworth, 1811)
- Bactra lancealana (Hübner, 1799)
- Bactra robustana (Christoph, 1872)
- Bactra venosana (Zeller, 1847) (nutgrass borer, nutsedge borer)
- Cacoecimorpha pronubana (Hübner, 1799) (carnation tortrix)
- Capua vulgana (Frolich, 1828)
- Celypha aurofasciana (Haworth, 1811)
- Celypha cespitana (Hübner, 1817)
- Syricoris lacunana (Denis & Schiffermüller, 1775) (dark strawberry tortrix)
- Celypha rivulana (Scopoli, 1763)
- Celypha rufana (Scopoli, 1763) (lakes marble)
- Celypha striana (Denis & Schiffermüller, 1775)
- Choristoneura hebenstreitella (mountain-ash tortricid) (Muller, 1764)
- Clavigesta purdeyi (Durrant, 1911) (pine leaf-mining moth)
- Clavigesta sylvestrana (Curtis, 1850)
- Clepsis consimilana (Hübner, 1817) (privet tortrix)
- Clepsis rurinana (Linnaeus, 1758)
- Clepsis senecionana (Hübner, 1819) (rustic tortrix)
- Clepsis spectrana (Treitschke, 1830) (cyclamen tortrix, cabbage leafroller, straw-colored tortrix)
- Cnephasia asseclana (Denis & Schiffermüller, 1775) (flax tortrix)
- Cnephasia communana (Herrich-Schäffer, 1851)
- Cnephasia conspersana Douglas, 1846
- Cnephasia longana (Haworth, 1811) (omnivorous leaftier moth, long-winged shade, strawberry fruitworm)
- Cnephasia pasiuana (meadow shade) (Hübner, 1799)
- Cnephasia stephensiana (Doubleday, 1849) (grey tortrix)
- Cnephasia incertana (Treitschke, 1835) (light grey tortrix)
- Cochylidia rupicola (Curtis, 1834) (chalk-cliff tortrix or conch)
- Cochylimorpha straminea (Haworth, 1811) (straw conch)
- Cochylis atricapitana (Stephens, 1852) (black-headed conch)
- Cochylis dubitana (Hübner, 1799) (little conch)
- Cochylis flaviciliana (Westwood, 1854) (gold-fringed conch)
- Cochylis hybridella (Hübner, 1813)
- Cochylis nana (Haworth, 1811)
- Cochylis pallidana Zeller, 1847 (sheep's-bit conch)
- Crocidosema plebejana Zeller, 1847
- Cydia amplana (Hübner, 1799) (rusty oak moth)
- Cydia coniferana (Saxesen, 1840)
- Cydia fagiglandana (Zeller, 1841) (beech moth)
- Cydia microgrammana (Guenee, 1845)
- Cydia nigricana (Fabricius, 1794) (pea moth)
- Cydia pomonella (Linnaeus, 1758) (codling moth)
- Cydia succedana (Denis & Schiffermüller, 1775)
- Dichrorampha acuminatana (Lienig & Zeller, 1846)
- Dichrorampha aeratana (Pierce & Metcalfe, 1915)
- Dichrorampha alpinana (Treitschke, 1830) (broad-blotch drill)
- Dichrorampha consortana Stephens, 1852
- Dichrorampha montanana (Duponchel, 1843)
- Dichrorampha petiverella (Linnaeus, 1758)
- Dichrorampha plumbagana (Treitschke, 1830)
- Dichrorampha plumbana (Scopoli, 1763)
- Dichrorampha simpliciana (Haworth, 1811)
- Dichrorampha vancouverana McDunnough, 1935 (tanacetum root moth)
- Ditula angustiorana (Haworth, 1811) n(red-barred tortrix, fruit-tree tortrix, vine tortrix)
- Eana penziana (Thunberg, 1791) (Pentz’s tortrix)
- Eana osseana (Scopoli, 1763) (dotted shade)
- Enarmonia formosana (Scopoli, 1763)
- Endothenia ericetana (Humphreys & Westwood, 1845)
- Endothenia marginana (Haworth, 1811) (downland marble)
- Endothenia quadrimaculana (Haworth, 1811)
- Endothenia ustulana (Haworth, 1811)
- Epagoge grotiana (Fabricius, 1781) (brown-barred tortrix)
- Epiblema foenella Linnaeus, 1758) (white-foot bell)
- Epiblema costipunctana (Haworth, 1811)
- Epiblema scutulana (Denis & Schiffermüller, 1775)
- Epiblema sticticana (Fabricius, 1794)
- Epiblema turbidana (Treitschke, 1835)
- Epinotia abbreviana (Fabricius, 1794)
- Epinotia bilunana (Haworth, 1811)
- Epinotia brunnichana (Linnaeus, 1767)
- Epinotia caprana (Fabricius, 1798)
- Epinotia cruciana (Linnaeus, 1761) (willow tortrix)
- Epinotia fraternana (Haworth, 1811)
- Epinotia immundana (Fischer v. Röslerstamm, 1839)
- Epinotia maculana (Fabricius, 1775)
- Epinotia mercuriana (Frolich, 1828)
- Epinotia nanana (Treitschke, 1835) (European spruce needleminer)
- Epinotia nemorivaga (Tengstrom, 1848) (bearberry bell)
- Epinotia nigricana (Herrich-Schäffer, 1851)
- Epinotia nisella (Clerck, 1759)
- Epinotia pygmaeana (Hübner, [1799])
- Epinotia ramella (Linnaeus, 1758)
- Epinotia signatana (Douglas, 1845)
- Epinotia solandriana (Linnaeus, 1758)
- Epinotia subocellana (Donovan, 1806)
- Epinotia subsequana (Haworth, 1811)
- Epinotia tedella (Clerck, 1759)
- Epinotia tenerana (Denis & Schiffermüller, 1775) (nut bud moth, alder tortricid)
- Epinotia tetraquetrana (Haworth, 1811) (square-barred bell)
- Epinotia trigonella (Linnaeus, 1758) (birch epinotia moth)
- Eriopsela quadrana (Hübner, 1813)
- Eucosma aspidiscana (Hübner, 1817) (golden-rod bell)
- Eucosma campoliliana (Denis & Schiffermüller, 1775)
- Eucosma cana (Haworth, 1811) (hoary bell)
- Eucosma conterminana (Guenée, 1845) (lettuce tortricid)
- Eucosma hohenwartiana (Denis & Schiffermüller, 1775) (bright bell)
- Eucosma obumbratana (Lienig & Zeller, 1846)
- Eucosma tripoliana (Barrett, 1880)
- Eudemis profundana (Denis & Schiffermüller, 1775) (diamond-back marble)
- Eulia ministrana (Linnaeus, 1758)
- Eupoecilia angustana (Hübner, 1799)
- Falseuncaria ruficiliana (Haworth, 1811) (red-fringed conch)
- Grapholita funebrana Treitschke, 1835 (plum fruit moth)
- Grapholita janthinana (Duponchel, 1843) (hawthorn leafroller)
- Grapholita tenebrosana Duponchel, 1843
- Grapholita compositella (Fabricius, 1775) (clover seed moth)
- Grapholita internana (Guenee, 1845)
- Grapholita jungiella (Clerck, 1759)
- Grapholita lunulana (Denis & Schiffermüller, 1775)
- Grapholita molesta (Busck, 1916) (Oriental fruit moth, peach moth)
- Gynnidomorpha alismana (Ragonot, 1883) (water plantain conch)
- Gynnidomorpha minimana (Caradja, 1916) (fen conch)
- Gynnidomorpha permixtana (Denis & Schiffermüller, 1775) (coast conch)
- Gynnidomorpha vectisana (Humphreys & Westwood, 1845) (small saltern conch)
- Gypsonoma aceriana (Duponchel, 1843) (poplar shoot-borer)
- Gypsonoma dealbana (Frolich, 1828) (common cloaked shoot)
- Hedya nubiferana (Haworth, 1811) (marbled orchard tortrix, green budworm moth)
- Hedya ochroleucana (Frolich, 1828) (buff-tipped marble, long-cloaked marble)
- Hedya pruniana (Hübner, 1799) (plum tortrix)
- Hysterophora maculosana (Haworth, 1811) (bluebell conch)
- Lathronympha strigana (Fabricius, 1775)
- Lobesia abscisana (Doubleday, 1859)
- Lobesia littoralis (Westwood & Humphreys, 1845)
- Lobesia reliquana (Hübner, 1825)
- Lozotaenia forsterana (Fabricius, 1781)
- Metendothenia atropunctana (Zetterstedt, 1839)
- Notocelia cynosbatella (Linnaeus, 1758)
- Notocelia incarnatana (Hübner, 1800) (chalk rose bell)
- Notocelia roborana (Denis & Schiffermüller, 1775)
- Notocelia rosaecolana (Doubleday, 1850)
- Notocelia tetragonana (Stephens, 1834) (square-spot bell)
- Notocelia trimaculana (Haworth, 1811)
- Notocelia uddmanniana (Linnaeus, 1758) (bramble shoot moth)
- Olethreutes arcuella (arched marble) (Clerck, 1759)
- Olethreutes palustrana (Lienig & Zeller, 1846)
- Olindia schumacherana (Fabricius, 1787)
- Orthotaenia undulana (Denis & Schiffermüller, 1775)
- Pammene argyrana (Hübner, 1799)
- Pammene albuginana (Guenée, 1845)
- Pammene aurana (Fabricius, 1775)
- Pammene fasciana (chestnut leafroller) (Linnaeus, 1761)
- Pammene germmana (Hübner, [1799])
- Pammene giganteana (Peyerimhoff, 1863)
- Pammene gallicana (Guenee, 1845)
- Pammene ochsenheimeriana (Lienig and Zeller, 1846)
- Pammene obscurana (Stephens, 1834)
- Pammene populana (Fabricius, 1787)
- Pammene regiana (Zeller, 1849)
- Pammene rhediella (Clerck, 1759)
- Pammene spiniana (Duponchel, 1843)
- Pammene splendidulana (Guenee, 1845)
- Pandemis cerasana (Hübner, 1786) (barred fruit-tree tortrix)
- Pandemis corylana (Fabricius, 1794) (chequered fruit-tree tortrix, hazel tortrix moth, filbert tortricid, barred fruit tree moth)
- Pandemis heparana (Denis & Schiffermüller, 1775) (dark fruit-tree tortrix, apple brown tortrix)
- Phalonidia affinitana (Douglas, 1846) (large saltmarsh conch)
- Phalonidia manniana (Fischer v. Röslerstamm, 1839)
- Phiaris micana (Denis & Schiffermüller, 1775)
- Phiaris schulziana (Fabricius, 1776)
- Philedone gerningana (Denis & Schiffermüller, 1775) (cinquefoil tortrix, cinquefoil twist)
- Philedonides lunana (Thunberg, 1784) (Walker’s Lanark tortrix)
- Phtheochroa inopiana(Haworth, 1811) (plain conch)
- Phtheochroa sodaliana (Haworth, 1811) (buckthorn conch)
- Piniphila bifasciana (Haworth, 1811)
- Pseudargyrotoza conwagana (Fabricius, 1775)
- Blastesthia posticana (Zetterstedt, 1839)
- Ptycholoma lecheana (Linnaeus, 1758) (Leche's twist moth)
- Rhopobota myrtillana (Humphreys & Westwood, 1845)
- Rhopobota naevana (Hübner, 1817) (holly tortrix moth, holly leaf tier, blackheaded fireworm)
- Rhopobota stagnana (Denis & Schiffermüller, 1775)
- Rhyacionia buoliana (Denis & Schiffermüller, 1775) (pine shoot moth)
- Rhyacionia pinivorana (Lienig & Zeller, 1846) (spotted shoot moth)
- Spilonota laricana (Heinemann, 1863)
- Spilonota ocellana (Denis & Schiffermüller, 1775) (bud moth)
- Stictea mygindiana (Denis & Schiffermüller, 1775)
- Strophedra nitidana (Fabricius, 1794)
- Syndemis musculana (Hübner, 1799)
- Thiodia citrana (Hübner, 1799) (lemon bell)
- Tortricodes alternella (Denis & Schiffermüller, 1775)
- Tortrix viridana Linnaeus, 1758 (European oak leafroller, green oak tortrix, green oak moth)
- Zeiraphera griseana (Hübner, 1799) (larch tortrix)
- Zeiraphera isertana (Fabricius, 1794)
- Zeiraphera ratzeburgiana (Saxesen, 1840) (spruce bud moth, Ratzeburg tortricid)

===== Superfamily Geometroidea =====
====== Family Geometridae (geometer moths, inchworms) ======
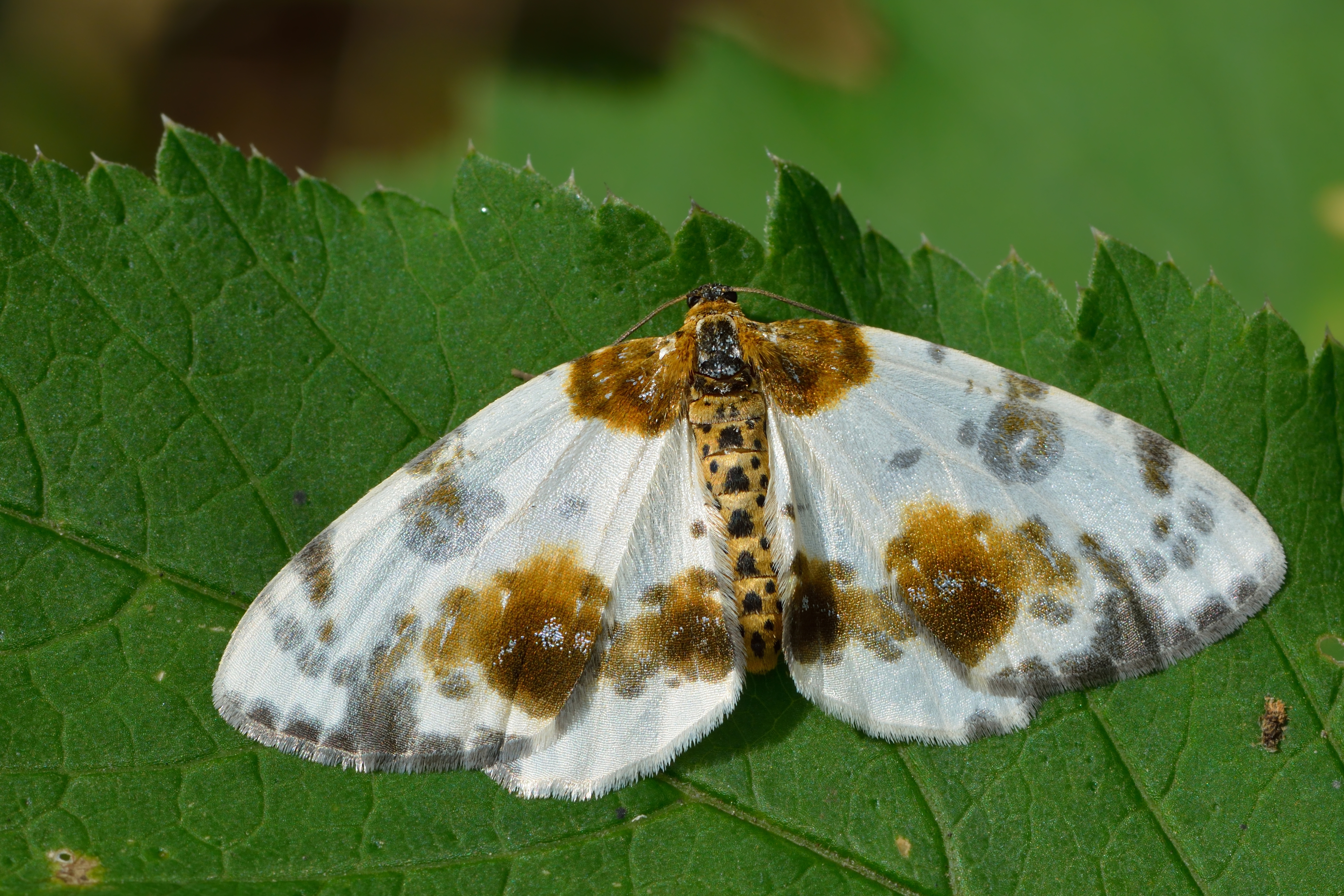
clouded magpie

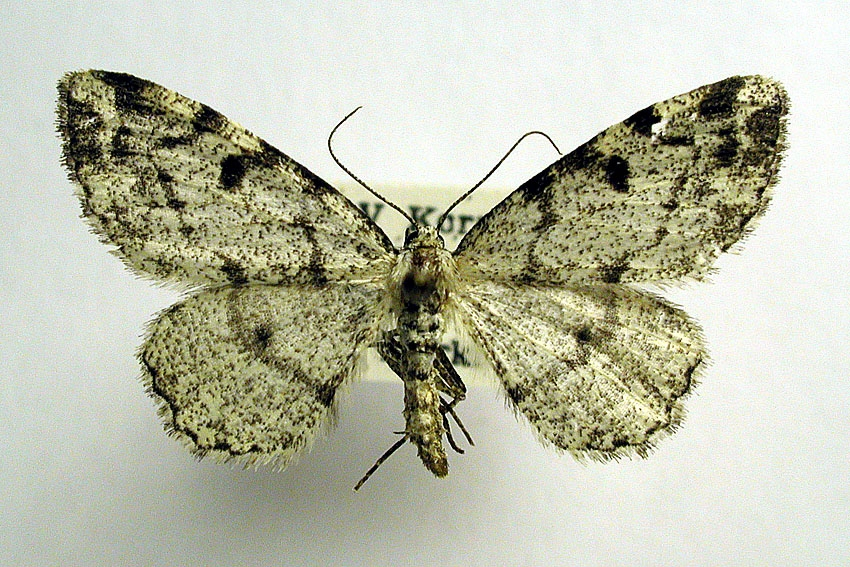
dotted carpet

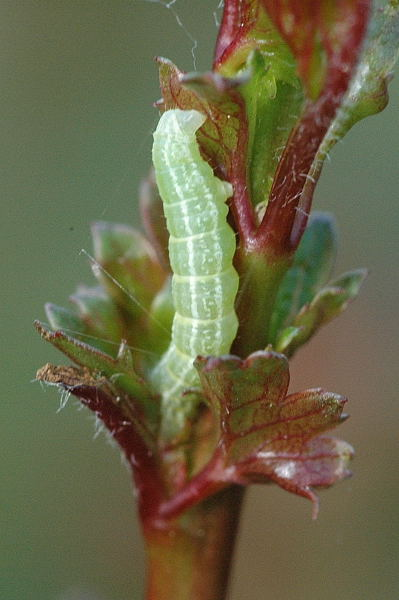
March moth caterpillar on midland hawthorn plant

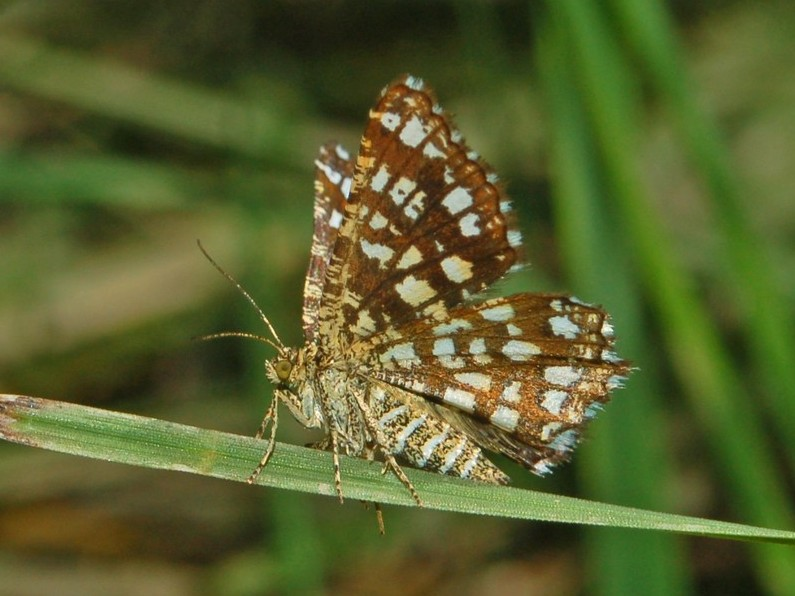
Latticed heath

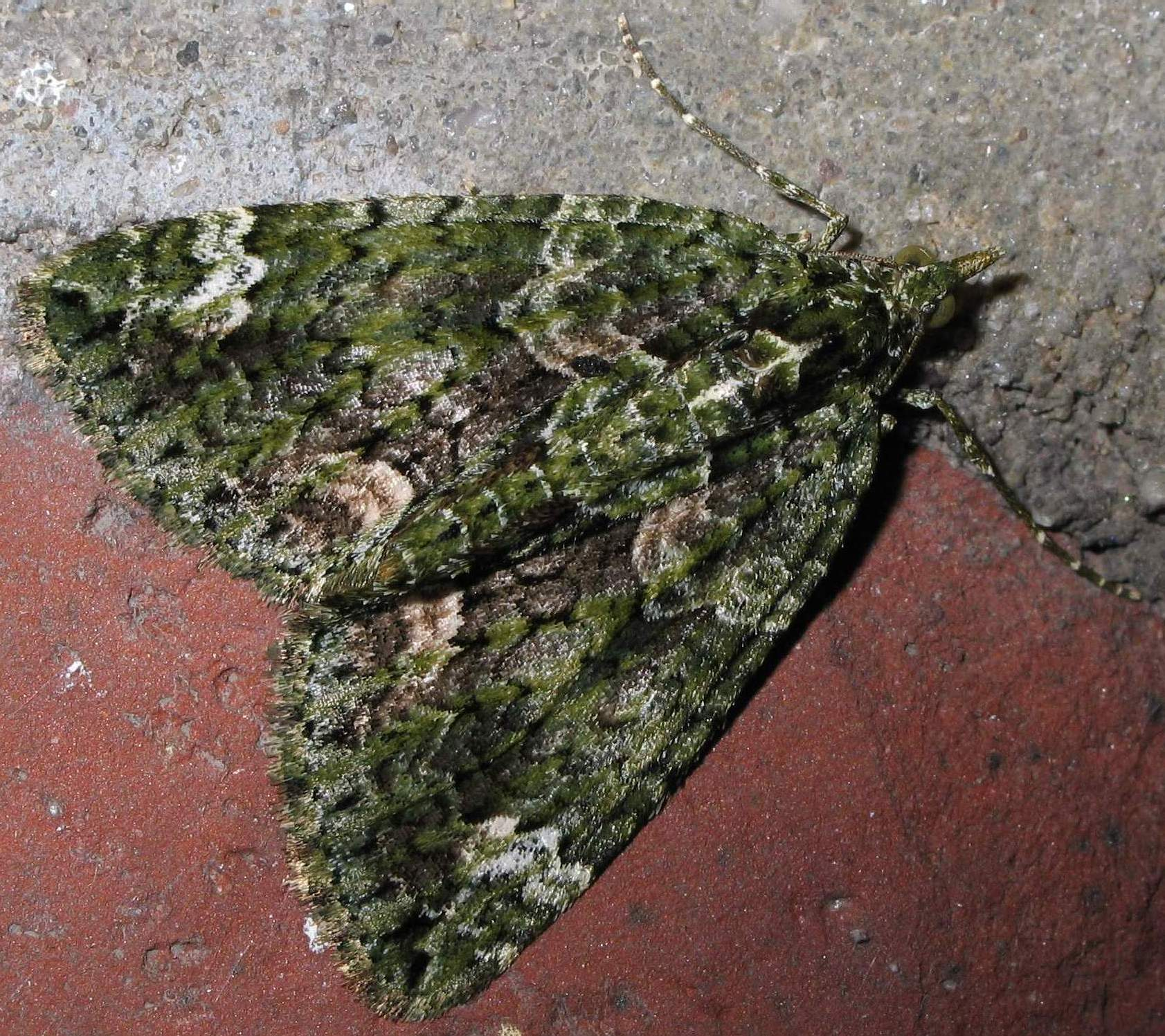
red-green carpet

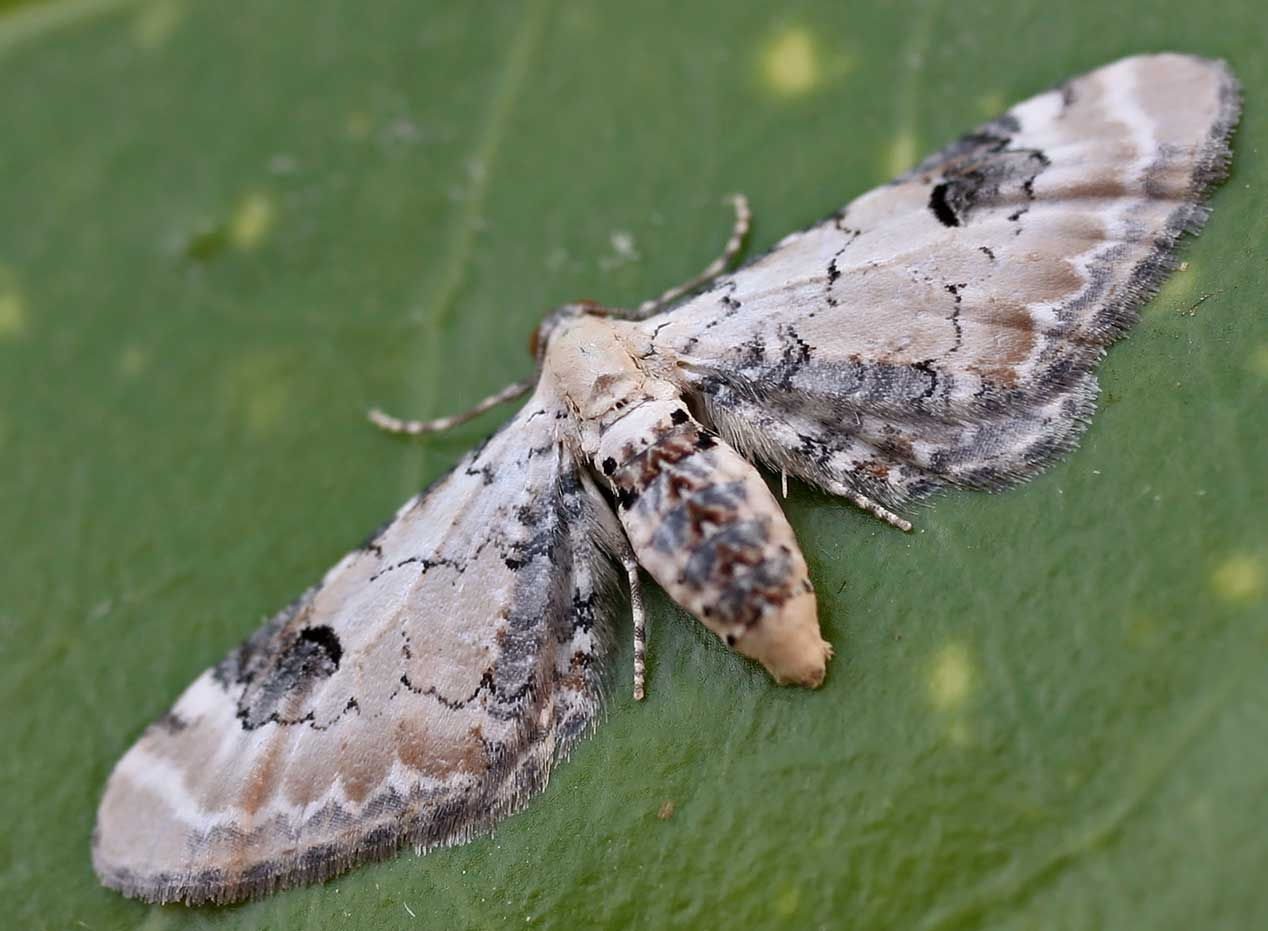
lime-speck pug

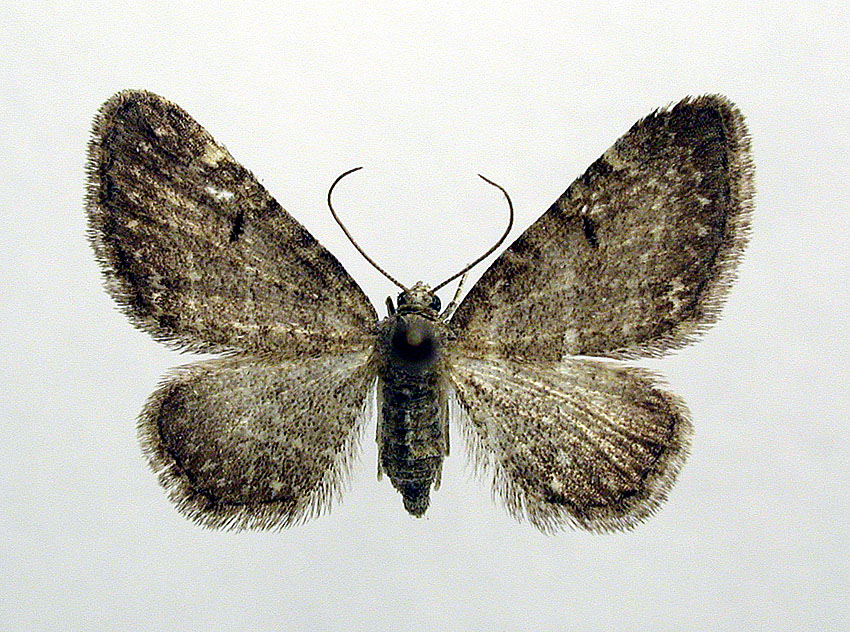
valerian pug

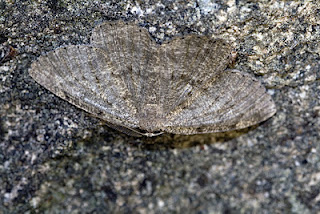
Irish annulet

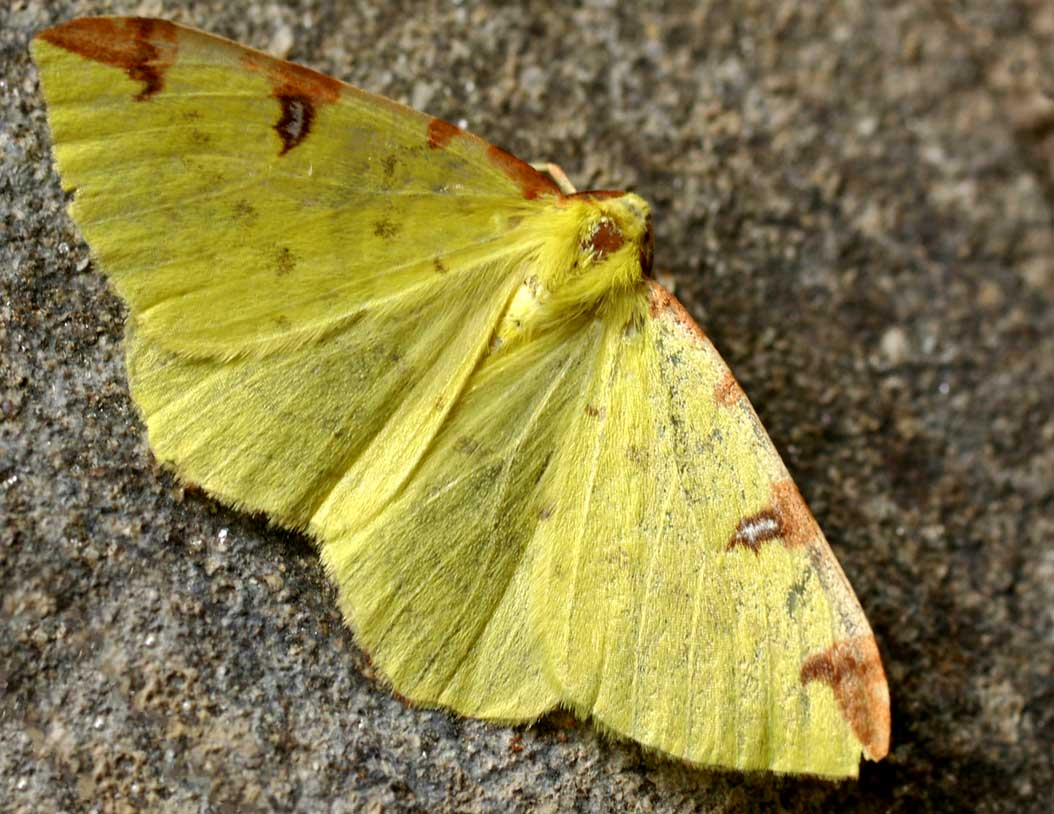
brimstone moth

- Abraxas grossulariata (Linnaeus, 1758) (magpie moth)
- Abraxas sylvata (Scopoli, 1763) (clouded magpie)
- Acasis viretata (Hübner, 1799) (yellow-barred brindle)
- Aethalura punctulata (Denis & Schiffermüller, 1775) (grey birch)
- Agriopis aurantiaria (Hübner, 1799) (scarce umber)
- Agriopis leucophaearia (Denis & Schiffermüller, 1775) (spring usher)
- Agriopis marginaria (Fabricius, 1776) (dotted border)
- Alcis jubata (Thunberg, 1788) (dotted carpet)
- Alcis repandata (Linnaeus, 1758) (mottled beauty)
- Alsophila aescularia (Denis & Schiffermüller, 1775) (March moth)
- Angerona prunaria (Linnaeus, 1758) (orange moth)
- Anticlea derivata (Denis & Schiffermüller, 1775) (streamer)
- Apeira syringaria (Linnaeus, 1758) (lilac beauty)
- Aplocera plagiata (Linnaeus, 1758) (treble-bar, St. John's Wort inchworm)
- Aspitates gilvaria (Denis & Schiffermüller, 1775) (straw belle)
- Asthena albulata (Hufnagel, 1767) (small white wave)
- Biston betularia (Linnaeus, 1758) (peppered moth)
- Biston strataria(Hufnagel, 1767) (oak beauty)
- Bupalus piniaria (Linnaeus, 1758) (bordered white, pine looper)
- Cabera exanthemata (Scopoli, 1763) (common wave)
- Cabera pusaria (Linnaeus, 1758) (common white wave)
- Campaea margaritata (Linnaeus, 1761) (light emerald)
- Camptogramma bilineata (Linnaeus, 1758) (yellow shell)
- Carsia sororiata (Hübner, 1813) (Manchester treble-bar)
- Catarhoe cuculata (Hufnagel, 1767) (royal mantle)
- Cepphis advenaria (Hübner, 1790) (little thorn)
- Charissa obscurata (Denis & Schiffermüller, 1775) (Scotch annulet)
- Chesias legatella Denis & Schiffermüller, 1775 (streak)
- Chesias rufata (Fabricius, 1775) (broom-tip)
- Chiasmia clathrata (Linnaeus, 1758) (latticed heath)
- Chloroclysta miata (Linnaeus, 1758) (autumn green carpet)
- Chloroclysta siterata (Hufnagel, 1767)
- Chloroclystis v-ata (Haworth, 1809) (v-pug)
- Cidaria fulvata (Forster, 1771) (barred yellow)
- Cleora cinctaria (Denis & Schiffermüller, 1775) (ringed carpet)
- Cleorodes lichenaria (Hufnagel, 1767) (Brussels lace)
- Coenocalpe lapidata (Hübner, 1809) (slender-striped rufous)
- Coenotephria salicata (Denis & Schiffermüller, 1775) (striped twin-spot carpet)
- Colostygia multistrigaria (Haworth, 1809) (mottled grey)
- Colostygia olivata (Denis & Schiffermüller, 1775) (beech-green carpet)
- Colostygia pectinataria (Knoch, 1781) (green carpet)
- Colotois pennaria (Linnaeus, 1761) (feathered thorn)
- Cosmorhoe ocellata (Linnaeus, 1758) (purple bar)
- Crocallis elinguaria (Linnaeus, 1758) (scalloped oak)
- Cyclophora linearia (Hübner, 1799) (clay triple-lines)
- Cyclophora punctaria (Linnaeus, 1758) (maiden's blush)
- Cyclophora albipunctata (birch mocha) (Hufnagel, 1767) (birch mocha)
- Cyclophora puppillaria (Hübner, 1799) (Blair's mocha)
- Deileptenia ribeata (Clerck, 1759) (satin beauty)
- Dyscia fagaria (Thunberg, 1784) (grey scalloped bar)
- Dysstroma citrata (Linnaeus, 1761) (dark marbled carpet, northern marbled carpet)
- Dysstroma truncata (Hufnagel, 1767) (common marbled carpet)
- Earophila badiata (Denis & Schiffermüller, 1775) (shoulder stripe)
- Ecliptopera silaceata (Denis & Schiffermüller, 1775) (small phoenix)
- Ectropis crepuscularia (Denis & Schiffermüller, 1775) (engrailed)
- Electrophaes corylata (Thunberg, 1792) (broken-barred carpet)
- Ematurga atomaria (Linnaeus, 1758) (common heath)
- Ennomos alniaria (Linnaeus, 1758) (canary-shouldered thorn)
- Ennomos autumnaria (Werneburg, 1859) (large thorn)
- Ennomos erosaria ([Denis and Schiffermüller], 1775) (September thorn)
- Ennomos fuscantaria (Haworth, 1809) (dusky thorn)
- Ennomos quercinaria (Hufnagel, 1767) (August thorn)
- Entephria caesiata (Denis & Schiffermüller, 1775) (grey mountain carpet)
- Entephria flavicinctata (Hübner, 1813) (yellow-ringed carpet)
- Epione repandaria (Hufnagel, 1767) (bordered beauty)
- Epirrhoe alternata (Muller, 1764) (common carpet, white-banded toothed carpet)
- Epirrhoe galiata (Denis & Schiffermüller, 1775) (galium carpet)
- Epirrhoe tristata (Linnaeus, 1758) (small argent and sable)
- Epirrita christyi (Allen, 1906) (pale November moth)
- Epirrita dilutata (Denis & Schiffermüller, 1775) (November moth)
- Epirrita filigrammaria (Herrich-Schäffer, 1846) (small autumnal moth, small autumnal carpet)
- Erannis defoliaria (Clerck, 1759) (mottled umber)
- Euchoeca nebulata (Scopoli, 1763) (dingy shell)
- Eulithis mellinata (Fabricius, 1787) (spinach moth)
- Eulithis populata (Linnaeus, 1758) (northern spinach moth)
- Eulithis pyraliata (Denis & Schiffermüller, 1775) (barred straw)
- Eulithis prunata (Linnaeus, 1758) (phoenix moth)
- Eulithis testata (Linnaeus, 1761) (chevron moth)
- Euphyia biangulata (Haworth, 1809) (cloaked carpet)
- Euphyia unangulata (Haworth, 1809) (sharp-angled carpet)
- Eupithecia abbreviata Stephens, 1831 (brindled pug)
- Eupithecia abietaria (Goeze, 1781) (cloaked pug)
- Eupithecia absinthiata (Clerck, 1759) (wormwood pug)
- Eupithecia assimilata Doubleday, 1856 (currant pug)
- Eupithecia centaureata (Denis & Schiffermüller, 1775) (lime-speck pug)
- Eupithecia denotata (Hübner, 1813) (campanula pug)
- Eupithecia distinctaria Herrich-Schäffer, 1848 (thyme pug)
- Eupithecia dodoneata Guenee, 1858 (oak-tree pug)
- Eupithecia exiguata (Hübner, 1813) (mottled pug)
- Eupithecia expallidata Doubleday, 1856 (bleached pug)
- Eupithecia haworthiata Doubleday, 1856 (Haworth’s pug)
- Eupithecia icterata (de Villers, 1789) (tawny speckled pug)
- Eupithecia indigata (Hübner, 1813) (ochreous pug)
- Eupithecia innotata (Hufnagel, 1767) (angle-barred pug)
- Eupithecia intricata (Zetterstedt, 1839) (Freyer's pug)
- Eupithecia lariciata (Freyer, 1841) (larch pug)
- Eupithecia nanata (Hübner, 1813) (narrow-winged pug)
- Eupithecia phoeniceata (Rambur, 1834) (cypress pug)
- Eupithecia pimpinellata (Hübner, 1813) (pimpinel pug)
- Eupithecia plumbeolata (Haworth, 1809) (lead-coloured pug)
- Eupithecia pulchellata Stephens, 1831 (foxglove pug)
- Eupithecia pusillata (Denis & Schiffermüller, 1775) (juniper pug, juniper looper)
- Eupithecia pygmaeata (Hübner, 1799) (marsh pug)
- Eupithecia satyrata (Hübner, 1813) (satyr pug)
- Eupithecia simpliciata (Haworth, 1809) (plain pug)
- Eupithecia subfuscata (Haworth, 1809) (grey pug)
- Eupithecia subumbrata (Denis & Schiffermüller, 1775) (shaded pug)
- Eupithecia succenturiata (Linnaeus, 1758) (bordered pug)
- Eupithecia tantillaria Boisduval, 1840 (dwarf pug)
- Eupithecia tenuiata (Hübner, 1813) (slender pug)
- Eupithecia tripunctaria Herrich-Schäffer, 1852 (white-spotted pug)
- Eupithecia trisignaria Herrich-Schäffer, 1848 (triple-spotted pug)
- Eupithecia valerianata (Hübner, 1813) (valerian pug)
- Eupithecia venosata (Fabricius, 1787) (netted pug)
- Eupithecia virgaureata Doubleday, 1861 (goldenrod pug)
- Eupithecia vulgata (Haworth, 1809) (common pug)
- Geometra papilionaria (Linnaeus, 1758) (large emerald)
- Gnophos obfuscata (Denis & Schiffermüller, 1775) (Scotch annulet)
- Gnophos dumetata Treitschke, 1827 (Irish annulet)
- Gymnoscelis rufifasciata (Haworth, 1809) (double-striped pug)
- Hemistola chrysoprasaria (Esper, 1795) (small emerald)
- Hemithea aestivaria (Hübner, 1789) (common emerald)
- Hydrelia sylvata (Denis & Schiffermüller, 1775) (waved carpet)
- Hydria undulata (Linnaeus, 1758) (scallop shell)
- Hydriomena furcata (Thunberg, 1784) (July highflyer)
- Hydriomena impluviata (Denis & Schiffermüller, 1775) (May highflyer)
- Hydriomena ruberata (Freyer, 1831) (ruddy highflyer)
- Hylaea fasciaria (Linnaeus, 1758) (barred red)
- Hypomecis punctinalis (Scopoli, 1763) (pale oak beauty)
- Idaea aversata (Linnaeus, 1758) (riband wave)
- Idaea biselata (Hufnagel, 1767) (small fan-footed wave)
- Idaea dimidiata (Hufnagel, 1767) (single-dotted wave)
- Idaea fuscovenosa(Goeze, 1781) (dwarf cream wave)
- Idaea muricata (Hufnagel, 1767) (purple-bordered gold)
- Idaea straminata (Borkhausen, 1794) (plain wave)
- Idaea seriata (Schrank, 1802) (small dusty wave)
- Idaea subsericeata (Haworth, 1809) (satin wave)
- Jodis lactearia (Linnaeus, 1758) (little emerald)
- Lampropteryx otregiata (Metcalfe, 1917) (Devon carpet)
- Lampropteryx suffumata (Denis & Schiffermüller, 1775) (water carpet)
- Larentia clavaria (Haworth, 1809) (mallow)
- Ligdia adustata (Denis & Schiffermüller, 1775) (scorched carpet)
- Lobophora halterata (Hufnagel, 1767) (seraphim)
- Lomaspilis marginata (Linnaeus, 1758) (clouded border)
- Lomographa bimaculata (Fabricius, 1775) (white-pinion spotted)
- Lomographa temerata (Denis & Schiffermüller, 1775) (clouded silver)
- Lycia hirtaria (Clerck, 1759) (brindled beauty)
- Lycia zonaria (Denis & Schiffermüller, 1775) (belted beauty)
- Macaria alternata (Denis & Schiffermüller, 1775) (sharp-angled peacock)
- Macaria liturata (Clerck, 1759) (tawny-barred angle)
- Macaria notata (Linnaeus, 1758) (peacock moth)
- Macaria wauaria (Linnaeus, 1758) (v-moth)
- Martania taeniata (Stephens, 1831) (barred carpet)
- Mesoleuca albicillata (Linnaeus, 1758) (beautiful carpet)
- Mesotype didymata (Linnaeus, 1758) (twin-spot didymata)
- Orthonama obstipata (Fabricius, 1794) (gem moth)
- Odezia atrata (Linnaeus, 1758) (chimney sweeper)
- Odontopera bidentata (Clerck, 1759) (scalloped hazel)
- Operophtera brumata (Linnaeus, 1758) (winter moth)
- Opisthograptis luteolata (Linnaeus, 1758) (brimstone moth)
- Orthonama vittata (Borkhausen, 1794) (oblique carpet)
- Ourapteryx sambucaria (Linnaeus, 1758) (swallow-tailed moth)
- Paradarisa consonaria (Hübner, 1799) (brindled square spot)
- Pasiphila chloerata (Mabille, 1870) (sloe pug)
- Pasiphila debiliata (Hübner, 1817) (bilberry pug)
- Pasiphila rectangulata (Linnaeus, 1758) (green pug)
- Pelurga comitata (Linnaeus, 1758) (dark spinach)
- Perconia strigillaria (Hübner, 1787) (grass wave)
- Peribatodes rhomboidaria (Denis & Schiffermüller, 1775) (willow beauty)
- Perizoma affinitata (Stephens, 1831) (rivulet moth)
- Perizoma albulata (Denis & Schiffermüller, 1775) (grass rivulet moth)
- Perizoma alchemillata (Linnaeus, 1758) (small rivulet moth)
- Perizoma bifaciata (Haworth, 1809) (barred rivulet moth)
- Perizoma blandiata (Denis & Schiffermüller, 1775) (pretty pinion)
- Perizoma flavofasciata (Thunberg, 1792) (sandy carpet, sandy rivulet)
- Perizoma minorata (Treitschke, 1828) (heath rivulet)
- Petrophora chlorosata (Scopoli, 1763) (brown silver-line)
- Phigalia pilosaria (Denis & Schiffermüller, 1775) (pale brindled beauty)
- Philereme transversata (Hufnagel, 1767) (dark umber)
- Philereme vetulata (Denis & Schiffermüller, 1775) (brown scallop)
- Plagodis dolabraria (Linnaeus, 1767) (scorched wing)
- Plagodis pulveraria (Linnaeus, 1758) (barred umber)
- Plemyria rubiginata(Denis & Schiffermüller, 1775) (blue-bordered carpet)
- Pseudopanthera macularia (Linnaeus, 1758) (speckled yellow)
- Pseudoterpna pruinata (Hufnagel, 1767) (grass emerald)
- Pterapherapteryx sexalata (Retzius, 1783) (small seraphim)
- Rheumaptera hastata (Linnaeus, 1758) (argent and sable moth)
- Rhodometra sacraria (Linnaeus, 1767) (vestal moth)
- Scopula emutaria (Hübner, [1809]) (rosy wave)
- Scopula floslactata (Haworth, 1809) (cream wave)
- Scopula imitaria (Hübner, 1799) (small blood-vein)
- Scopula immutata (Linnaeus, 1758)
- Scopula marginepunctata (Goeze, 1781) (mullein wave)
- Scotopteryx chenopodiata (Linnaeus, 1758) (shaded broad-bar)
- Scotopteryx luridata (Hufnagel, 1767) (July belle)
- Scotopteryx mucronata (Scopoli, 1763) (lead belle)
- Selenia dentaria (Fabricius, 1775) (early thorn)
- Selenia lunularia (Hübner, 1788) (lunar thorn)
- Selidosema brunnearia(de Villers, 1789) (bordered grey)
- Thera britannica (Turner, 1925) (spruce carpet)
- Thera cognata (Thunberg, 1792) (chestnut-coloured carpet, Durham juniper moth)
- Thera cupressata (Geyer, 1831) (cypress carpet)
- Thera firmata (Hübner, 1822) (pine carpet)
- Thera juniperata (Linnaeus, 1758) (juniper carpet moth)
- Thera obeliscata (Hübner, 1787) (grey pine carpet)
- Theria primaria (Haworth, 1809) (early moth)
- Timandra comae Schmidt, 1931 (blood-vein)
- Trichopteryx carpinata (Borkhausen, 1794) (early tooth-striped moth)
- Venusia cambrica Curtis, 1839 (Welsh wave)
- Xanthorhoe decoloraria (Esper, 1806) (red carpet moth)
- Xanthorhoe designata (Hufnagel, 1767) (flame carpet moth)
- Xanthorhoe ferrugata (Clerck, 1759) (dark-barred twin-spot carpet moth)
- Xanthorhoe fluctuata (Linnaeus, 1758) (garden carpet moth)
- Xanthorhoe montanata (Denis & Schiffermüller, 1775) (silver-ground carpet moth)
- Xanthorhoe spadicearia (Denis & Schiffermüller, 1775) (red twin-spot carpet moth)

===== Superfamily Drepanoidea (hook tip moths) =====
====== Family Drepanidae ======
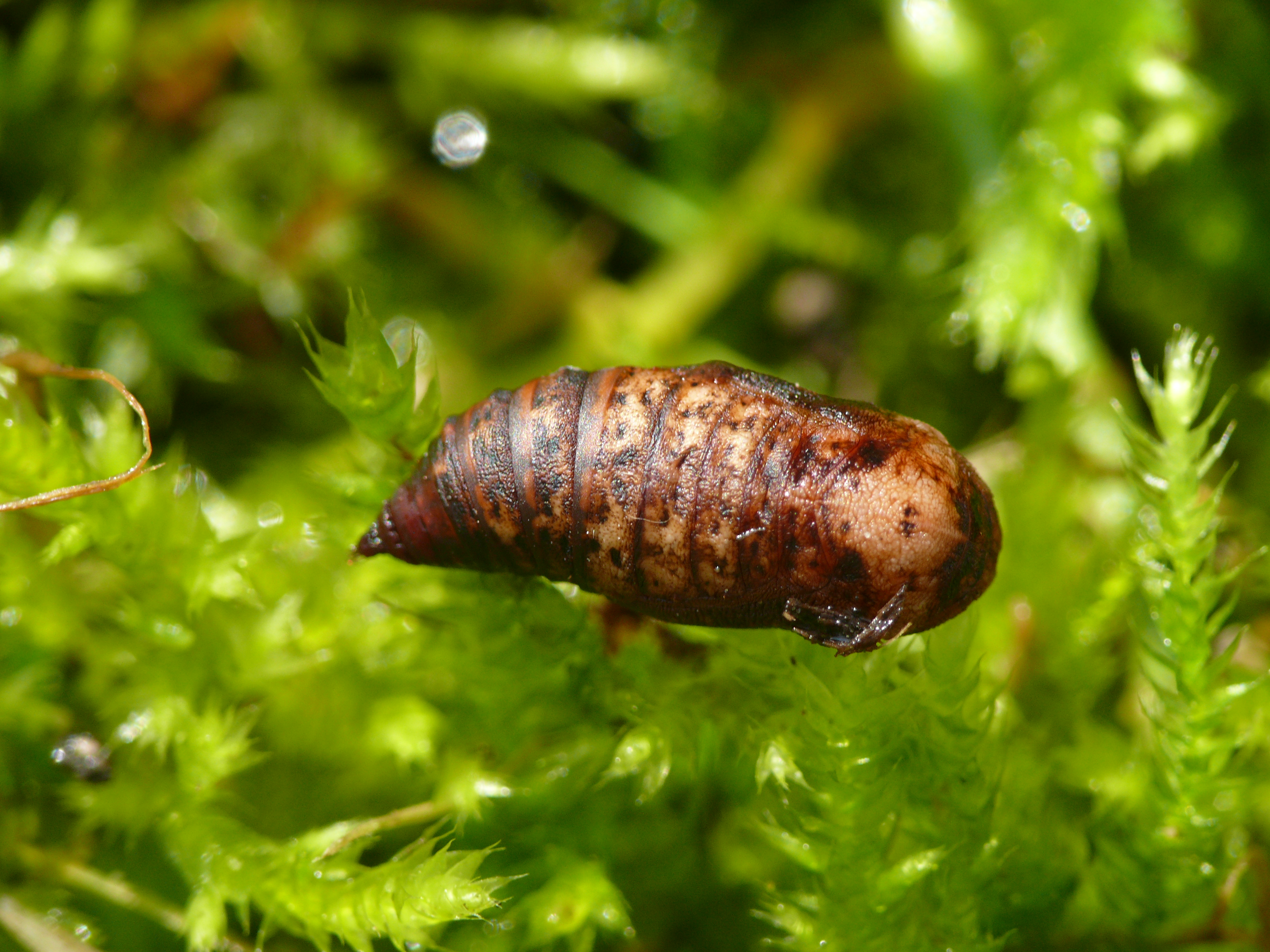
Peach blossom cocoon

- Achlya flavicornis (Linnaeus, 1758) (yellow horned moth)
- Cilix glaucata (Scopoli, 1763) (Chinese character moth)
- Drepana falcataria (Linnaeus, 1758) (pebble hook-tip moth)
- Falcaria lacertinaria (Linnaeus, 1758) (scalloped hook-tip moth)
- Habrosyne pyritoides (Hufnagel, 1766) (buff arches)
- Ochropacha duplaris (Linnaeus, 1761)
- Tethea or (Denis & Schiffermüller, 1775) (poplar lutestring)
- Tetheella fluctuosa (Hübner, 1803) (satin lutestring)
- Thyatira batis (Linnaeus, 1758) (peach blossom moth)
- Watsonalla binaria (Hufnagel, 1767) (oak hook-tip moth)

===== Superfamily Bombycoidea =====
====== Family Lasiocampidae (eggars, snout moths, lappet moths) ======
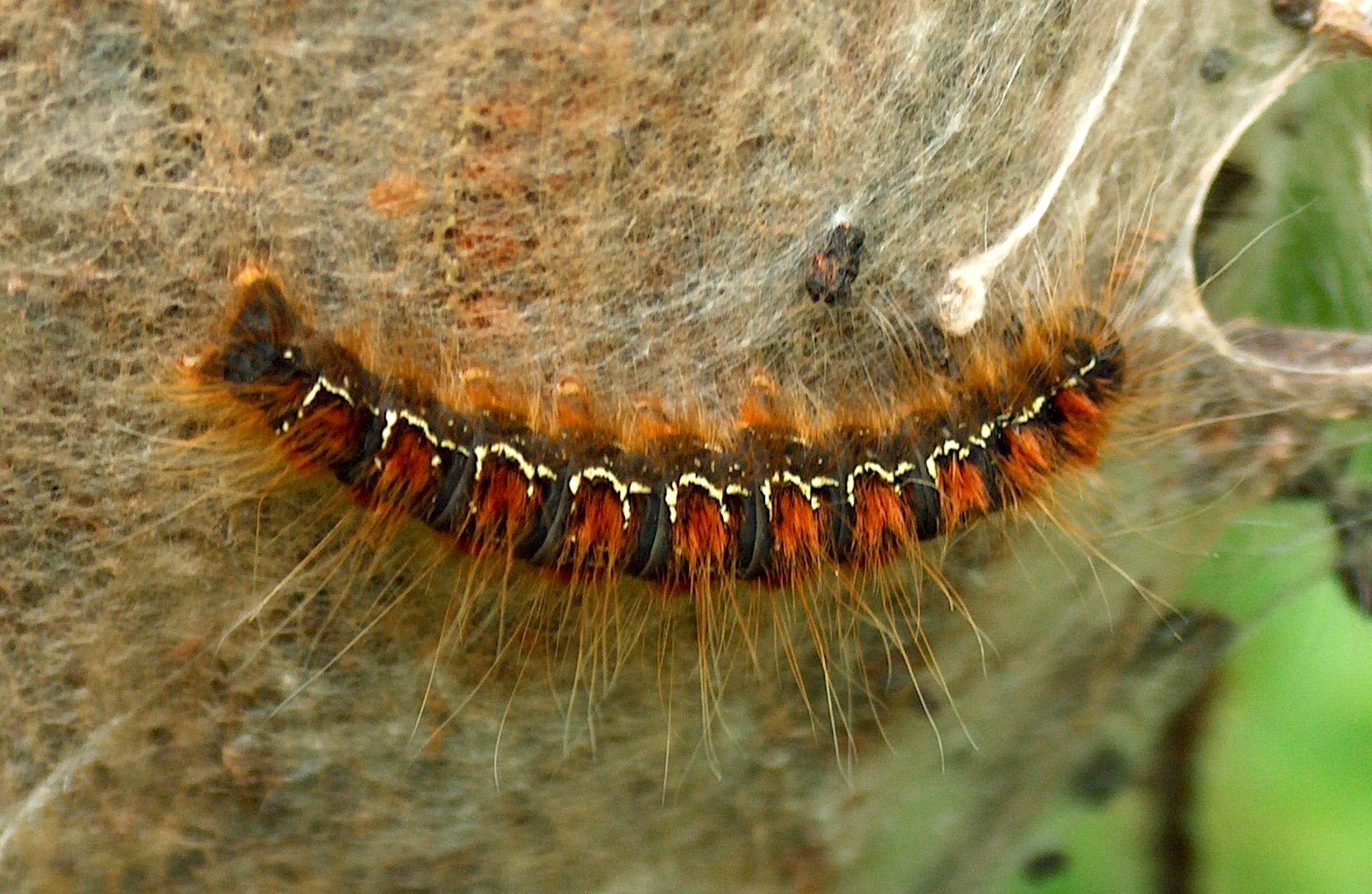
Caterpillar of the small eggar

- Eriogaster lanestris (small eggar) (Linnaeus, 1758)
- Euthrix potatoria (drinker moth) (Linnaeus, 1758)
- Lasiocampa quercus (oak eggar) (Linnaeus, 1758)
- Macrothylacia rubi (fox moth) (Linnaeus, 1758)
- Malacosoma neustria (lackey moth) (Linnaeus, 1758)
- Poecilocampa populi (December moth) (Linnaeus, 1758)
- Trichiura crataegi (pale oak eggar) (Linnaeus, 1758)

====== Family Saturniidae ======
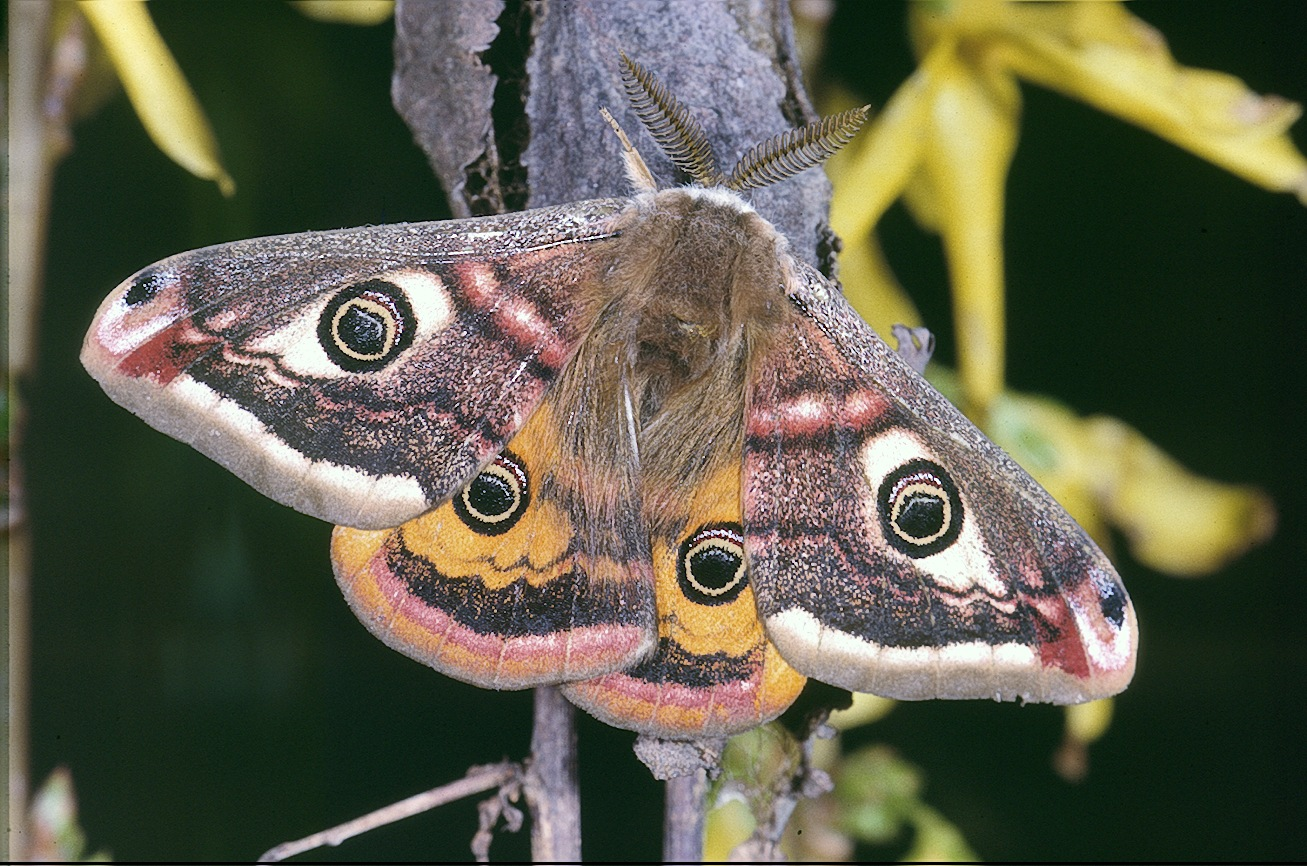
Male Saturnia pavonia

- Saturnia pavonia (small emperor moth) (Linnaeus, 1758)

====== Family Sphingidae (hawk-moths) ======
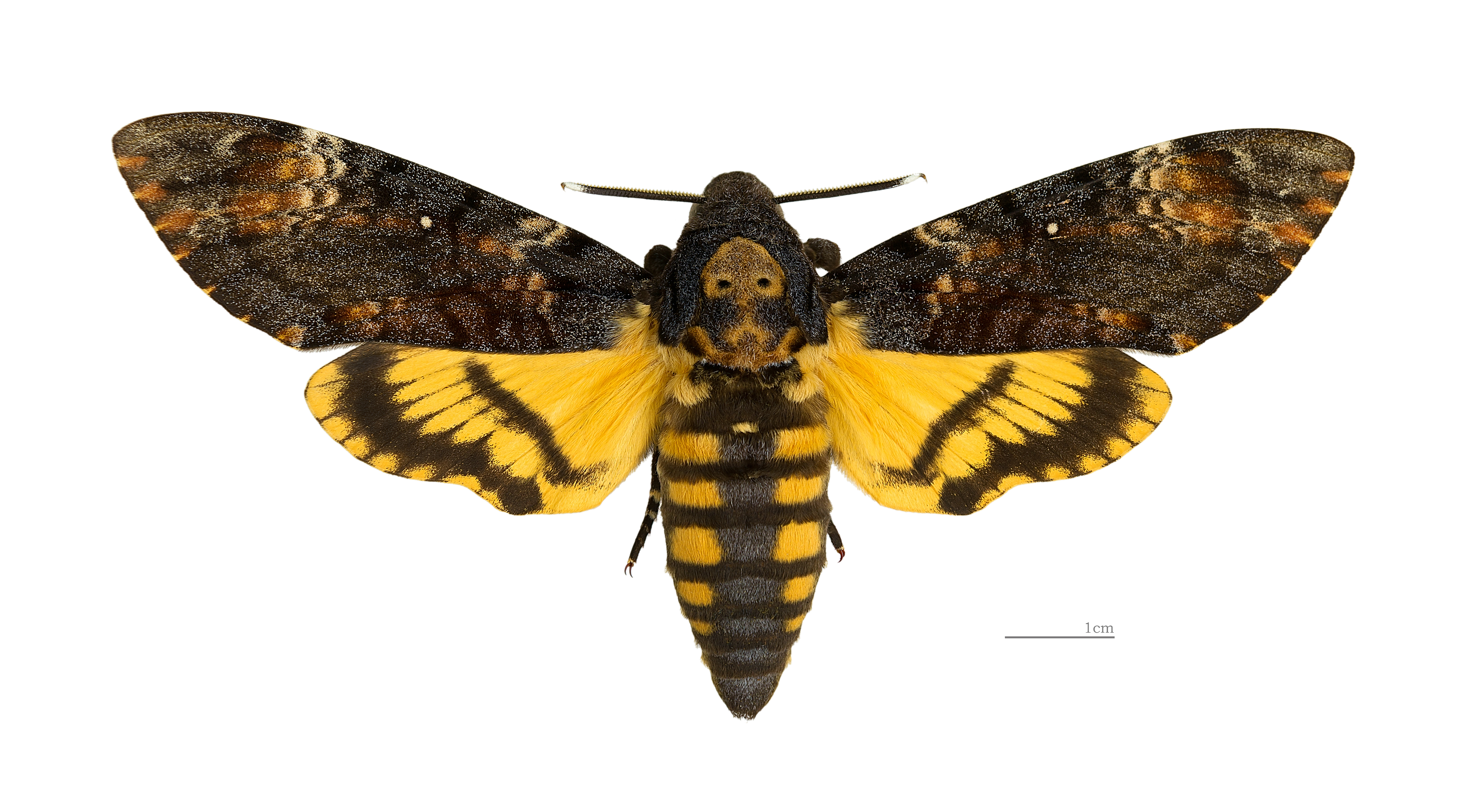
The notorious male African death's head hawkmoth, which summers in Ireland.

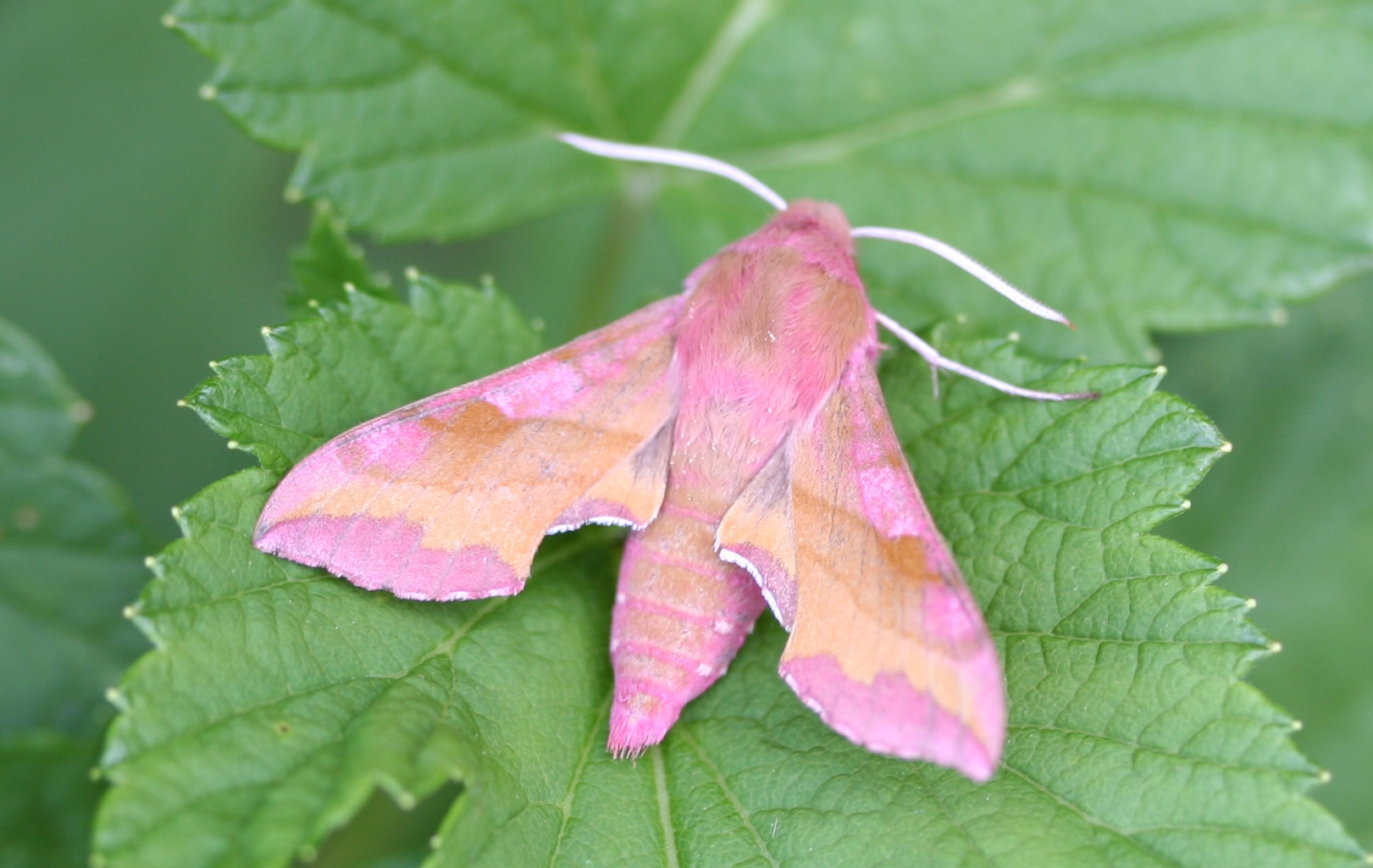
small elephant hawk-moth

- Acherontia atropos (Linnaeus, 1758) (African death's head hawkmoth)
- Agrius convolvuli (Linnaeus, 1758) (convolvulus hawk-moth)
- Daphnis nerii (Linnaeus, 1758) (oleander hawk-moth, army green moth)
- Deilephila elpenor (Linnaeus, 1758) (elephant hawk moth)
- Deilephila porcellus (Linnaeus, 1758) (small elephant hawk-moth)
- Hemaris tityus (Linnaeus, 1758) (narrow-bordered bee hawk-moth)
- Hippotion celerio (Linnaeus, 1758) (vine hawk-moth, silver-striped hawk-moth)
- Hyles gallii (Rottemburg, 1775) (bedstraw hawk-moth, galium sphinx)
- Hyles livornica (Esper, 1779) (striped hawk-moth)
- Laothoe populi (Linnaeus, 1758) (poplar hawk-moth)
- Macroglossum stellatarum (Linnaeus, 1758) (hummingbird hawk-moth)
- Mimas tiliae (Linnaeus, 1758) (lime hawk-moth)
- Smerinthus ocellata (Linnaeus, 1758) (eyed hawk-moth)

===== Superfamily Noctuoidea (owlet moths) =====
====== Family Erebidae ======
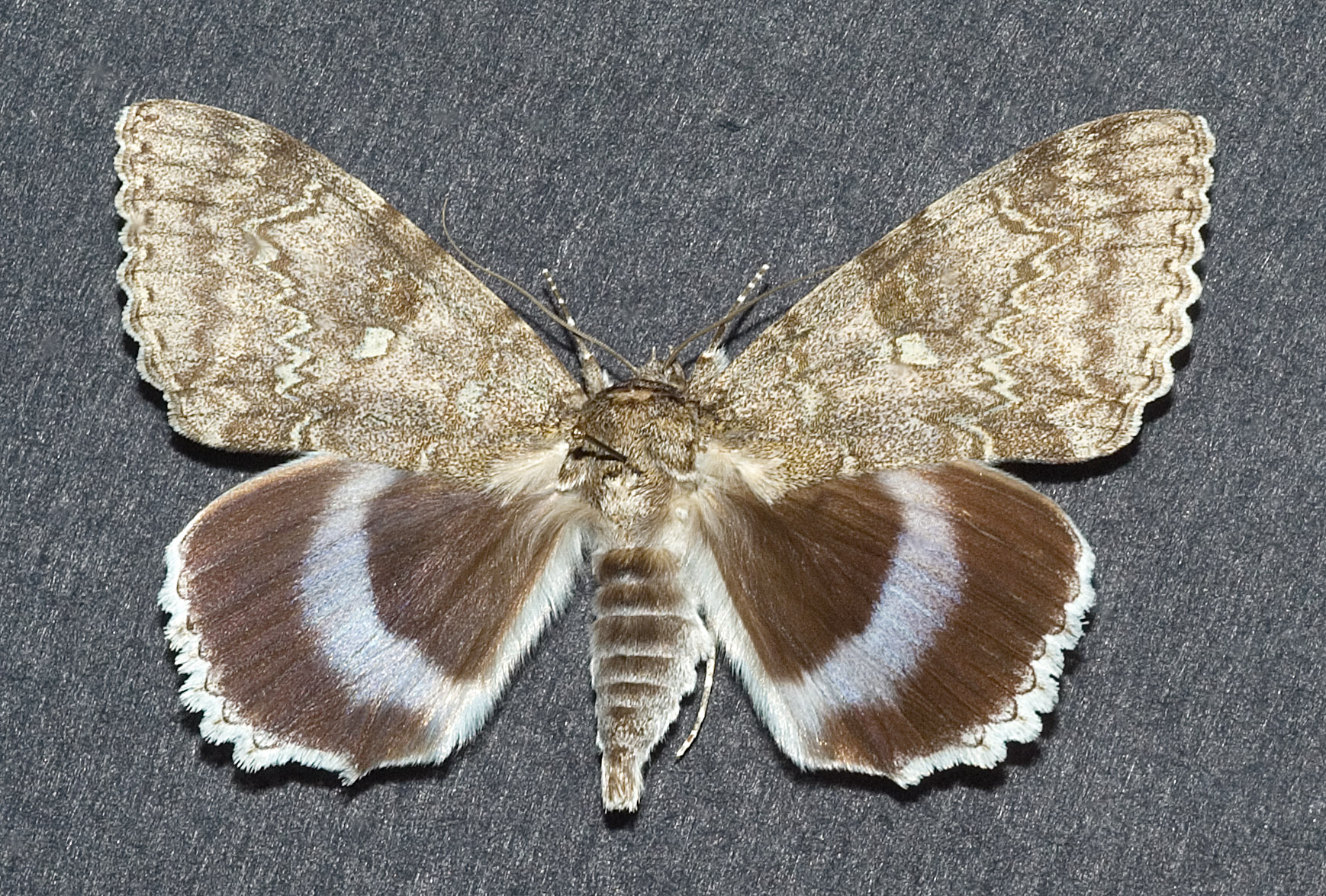
Catocala fraxini

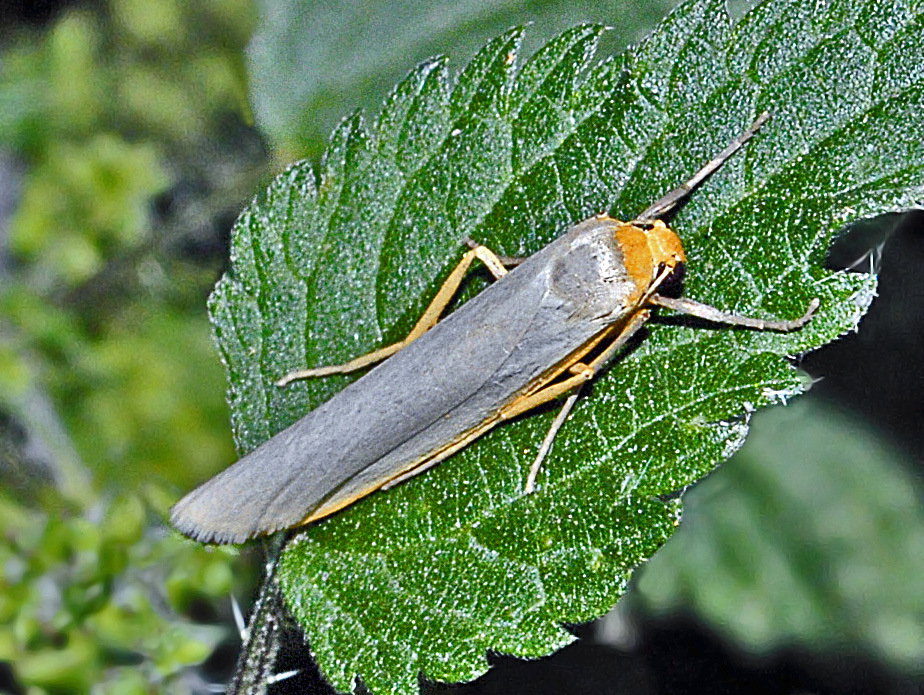
hoary footman

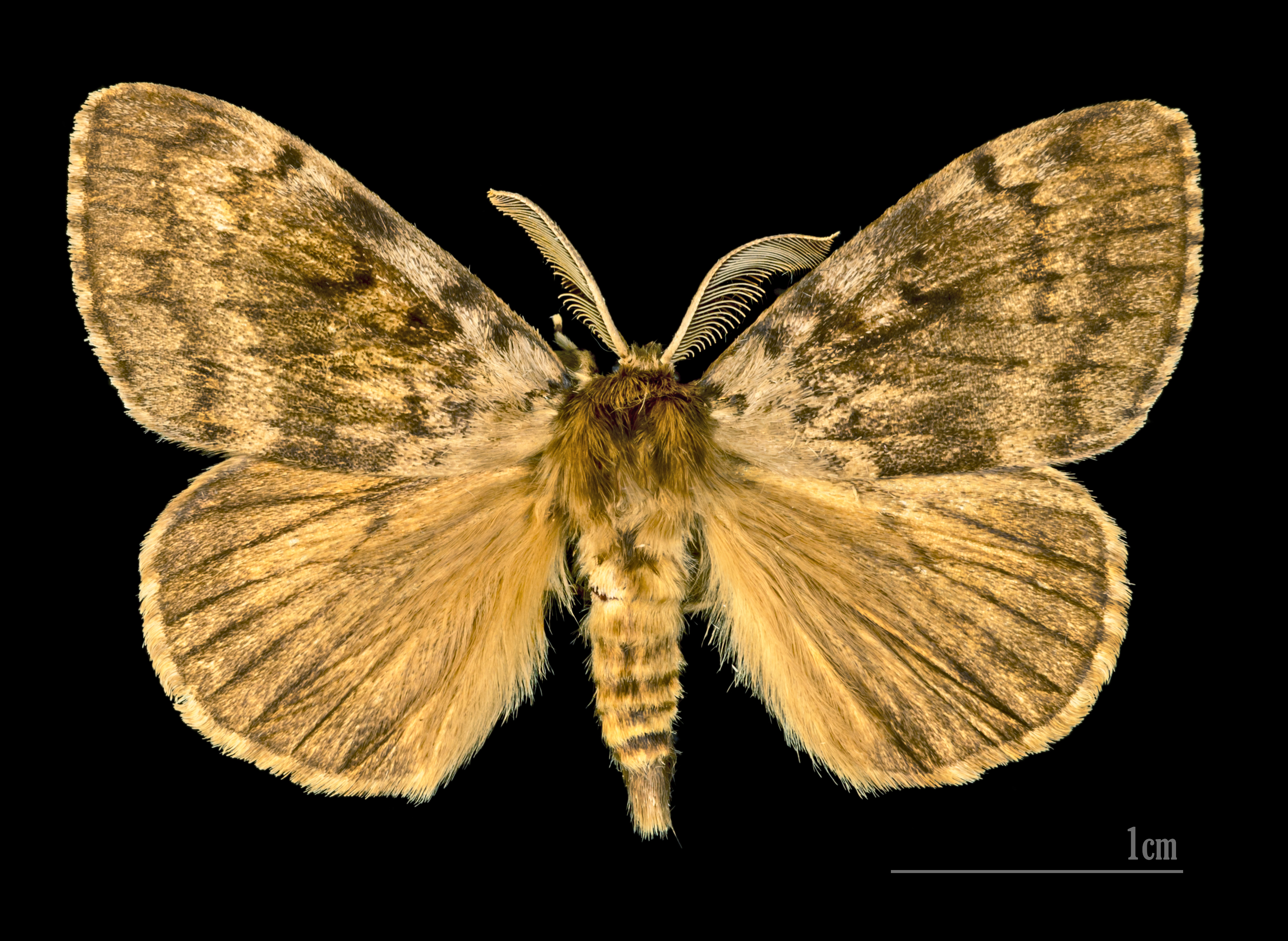
gypsy moth

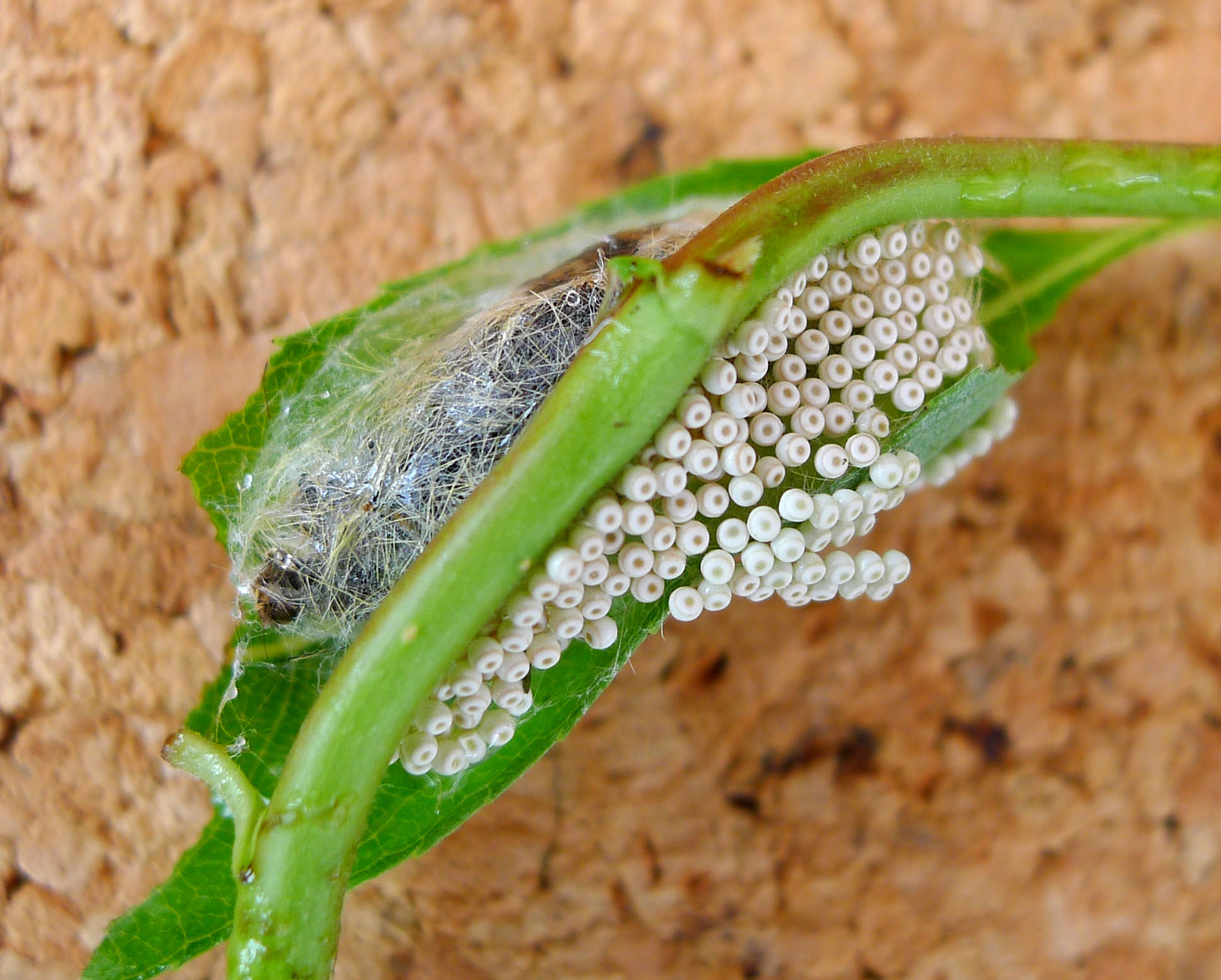
Vapourer moth eggs

- Arctia caja (Linnaeus, 1758) (garden tiger moth, great tiger moth)
- Atolmis rubricollis (Linnaeus, 1758) (red-necked footman)
- Calliteara pudibunda (Linnaeus, 1758) (pale tussock)
- Catocala fraxini (Linnaeus, 1758) (blue underwing, Clifden nonpareil)
- Diacrisia sannio (clouded buff) (Linnaeus, 1758) (clouded buff)
- Diaphora mendica (Clerck, 1759) (muslin moth)
- Dicallomera fascelina (Linnaeus, 1758) (dark tussock)
- Eilema caniola (Hübner, 1808) (hoary footman)
- Manulea complana (Linnaeus, 1758) (scarce footman)
- Katha depressa (Esper, 1787) (buff footman)
- Manulea lurideola (Zincken, 1817) (common footman)
- Wittia sororcula (Hufnagel, 1766) (orange footman)
- Eublemma ostrina (Hübner, 1808) (purple marbled)
- Eublemma parva (Hübner, 1808) (small marbled)
- Callistege mi(Clerck, 1759) (Mother Shipton moth)
- Euclidia glyphica (Linnaeus, 1758) (burnet companion moth)
- Euproctis similis (Fuessly, 1775) (yellow-tail, goldtail moth, swan moth)
- Grammodes stolida (Fabricius, 1775) (geometrician)
- Herminia grisealis (Denis & Schiffermüller, 1775) (small fan-foot)
- Zanclognatha tarsipennalis(Treitschke, 1835) (fan-foot)
- Hypena crassalis (Fabricius, 1787) (beautiful snout)
- Hypena obsitalis(Hübner, 1813) (Bloxworth snout)
- Hypena proboscidalis (Linnaeus, 1758) (snout moth)
- Hypenodes humidalis Doubleday, 1850 (marsh oblique-barred moth)
- Leucoma salicis (Linnaeus, 1758) (white satin moth)
- Lithosia quadra (Linnaeus, 1758) (four-spotted footman)
- Lymantria dispar (Linnaeus, 1758) (gypsy moth)
- Lymantria monacha (Linnaeus, 1758) (black arches, nun moth)
- Miltochrista miniata (Forster, 1771) (rosy footman)
- Nudaria mundana (Linnaeus, 1761) (muslin footman)
- Orgyia antiqua (Linnaeus, 1758) (rusty tussock moth, vapourer)
- Parasemia plantaginis (Linnaeus, 1758)(wood tiger)
- Pechipogo strigilata (Linnaeus, 1758) (common fan-foot)
- Phragmatobia fuliginosa (Linnaeus, 1758) (ruby tiger)
- Phytometra viridaria (Clerck, 1759) (small purple-barred moth)
- Rivula sericealis (Scopoli, 1763) (straw dot)
- Schrankia costaestrigalis (Stephens, 1834) (pinion-streaked snout)
- Scoliopteryx libatrix (Linnaeus, 1758) (the herald)
- Setina irrorella (Linnaeus, 1758) (dew moth)
- Spilosoma lubricipeda (Linnaeus, 1758) (white ermine)
- Spilosoma lutea (Hufnagel, 1766) (buff ermine)
- Thumatha senex (Hübner, 1808) (round-winged muslin)
- Tyria jacobaeae (Linnaeus, 1758) (cinnabar moth)
- Utetheisa pulchella (Linnaeus, 1758) (crimson-speckled flunkey)

====== Family Noctuidae (owlet moths, cutworms, armyworms) ======
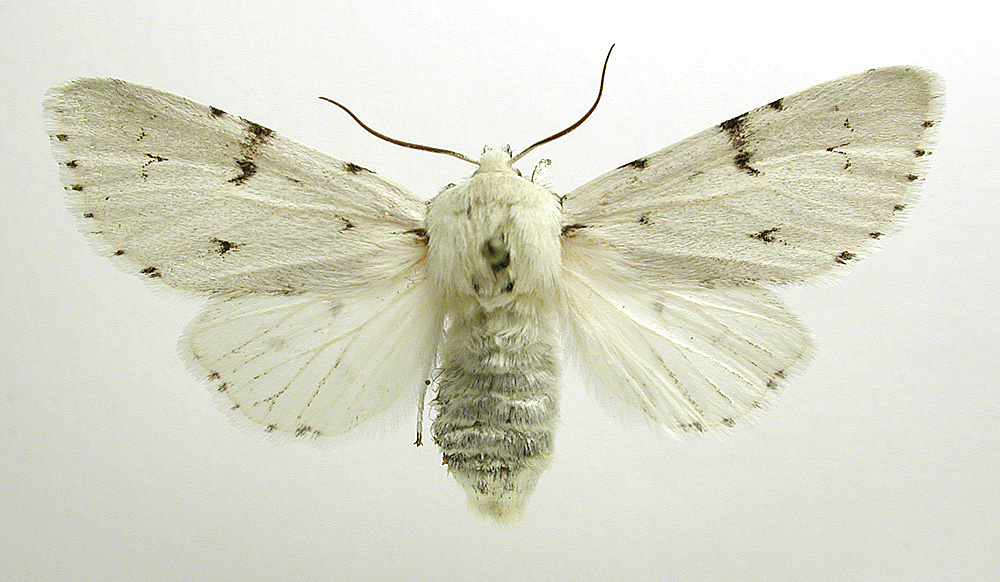
The miller

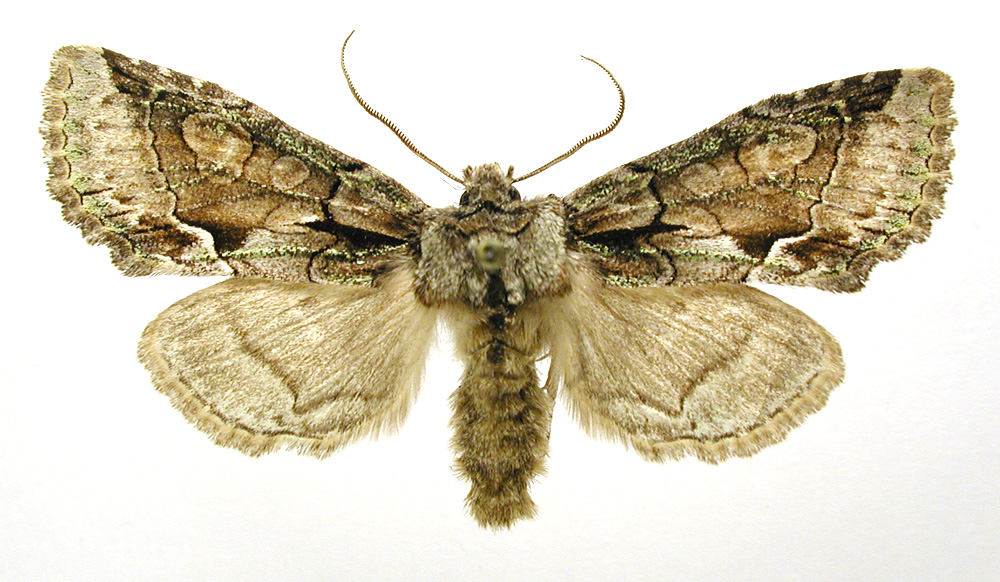
green-brindled crescent

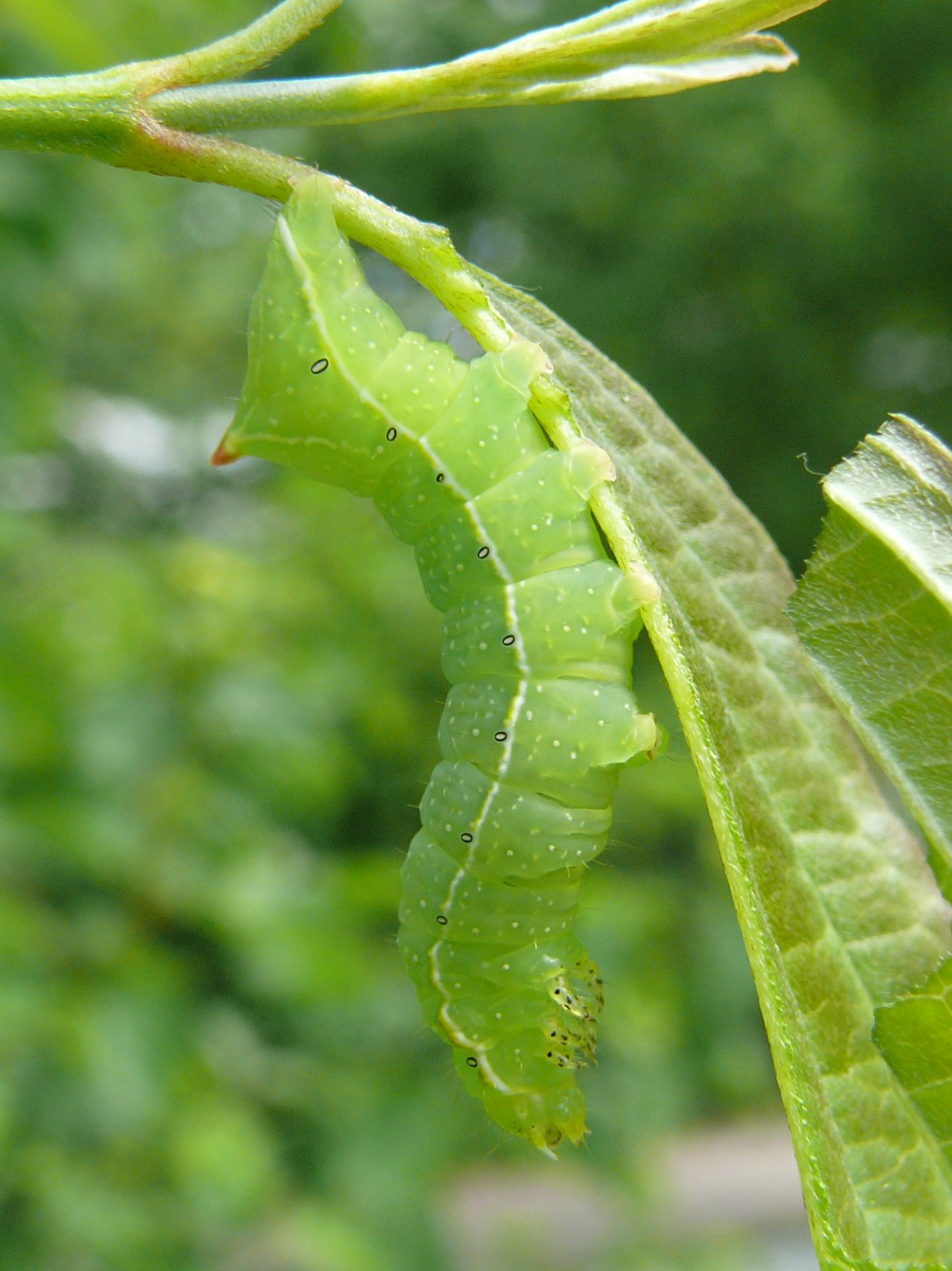
Svensson's copper underwing caterpillar

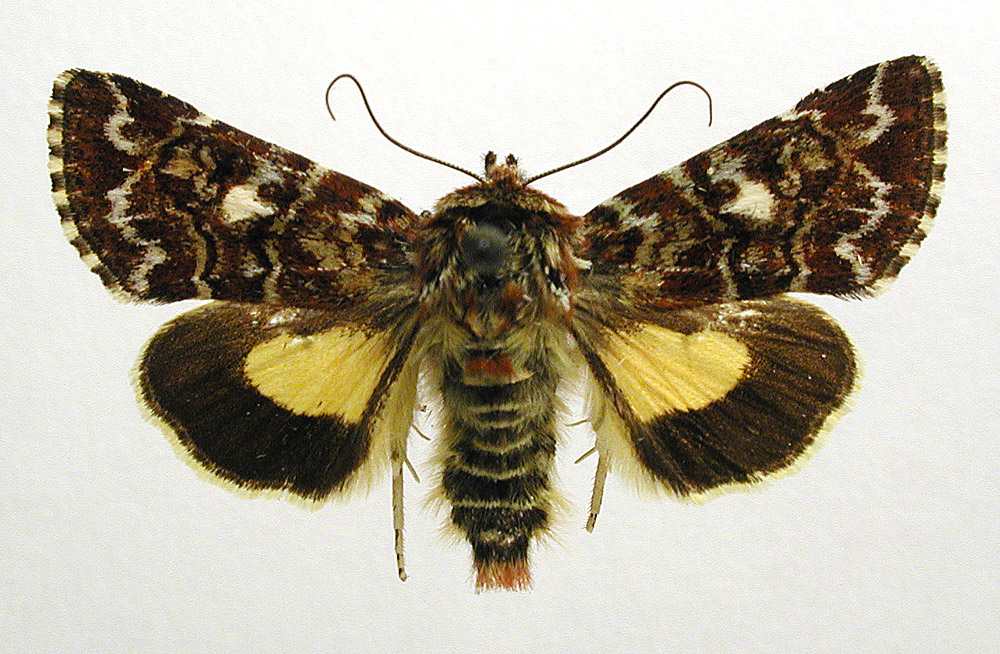
Beautiful yellow underwing

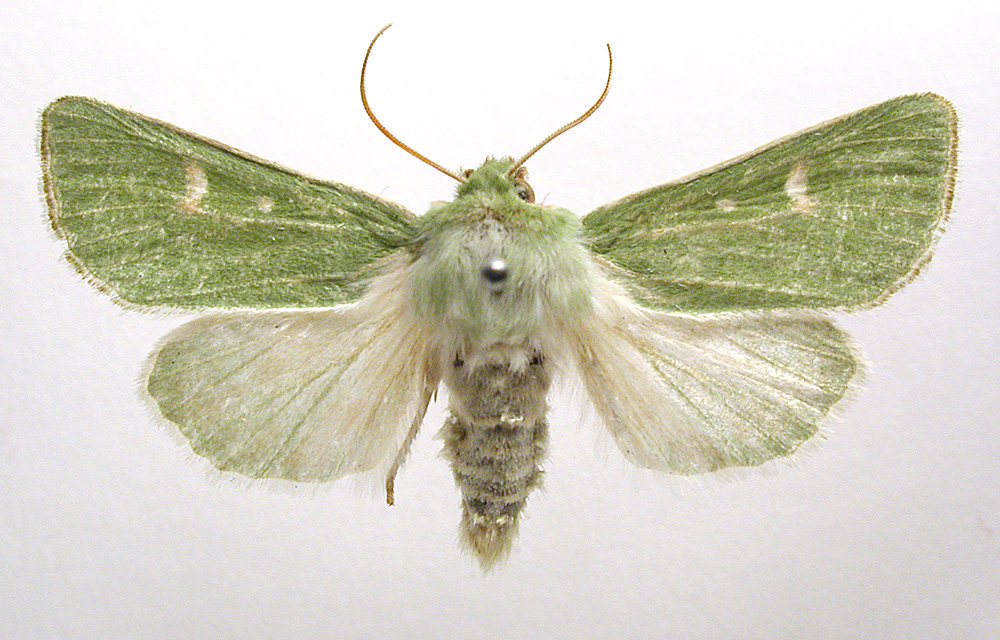
Burren green, named after The Burren, County Clare

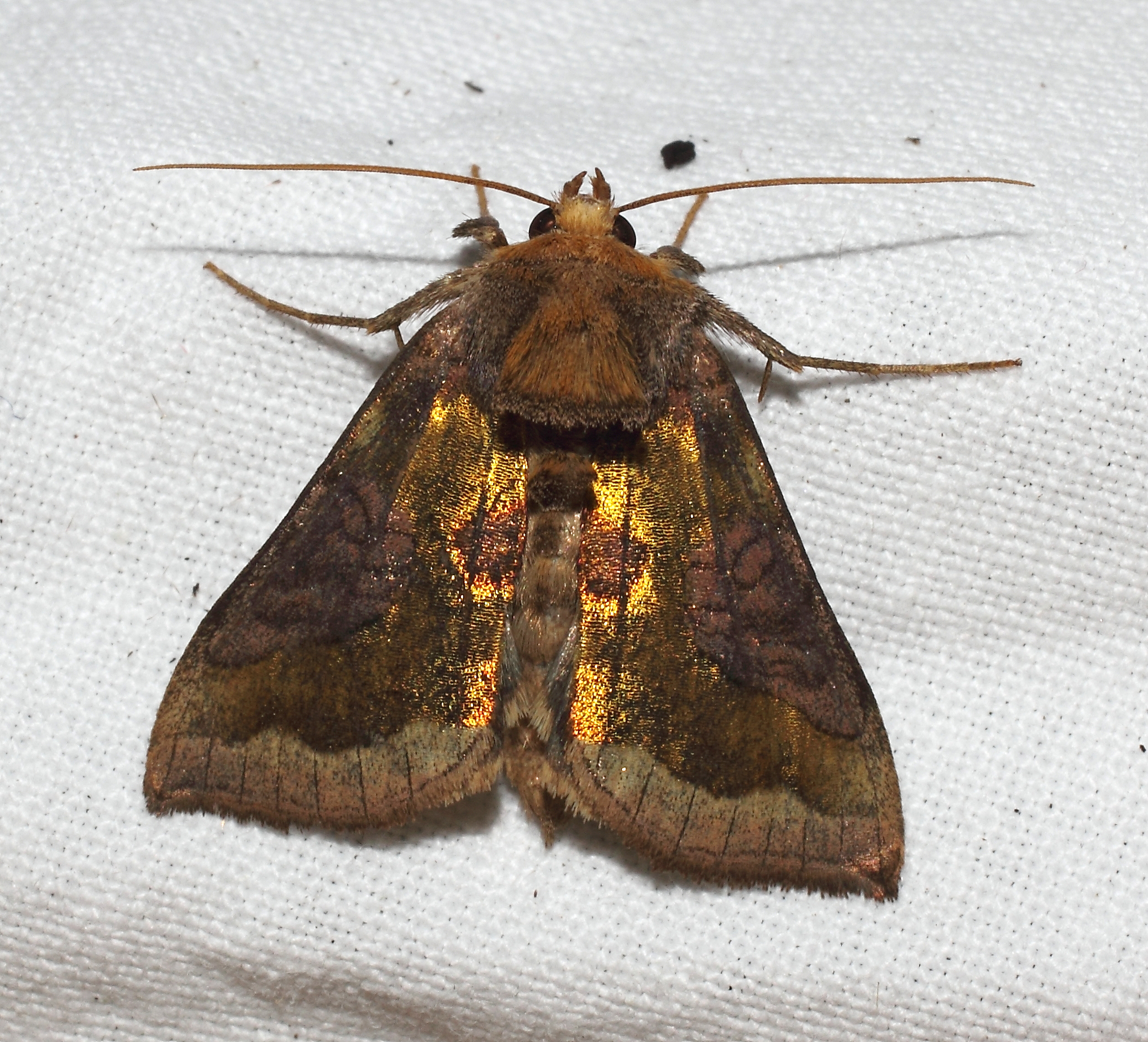
Burnished brass

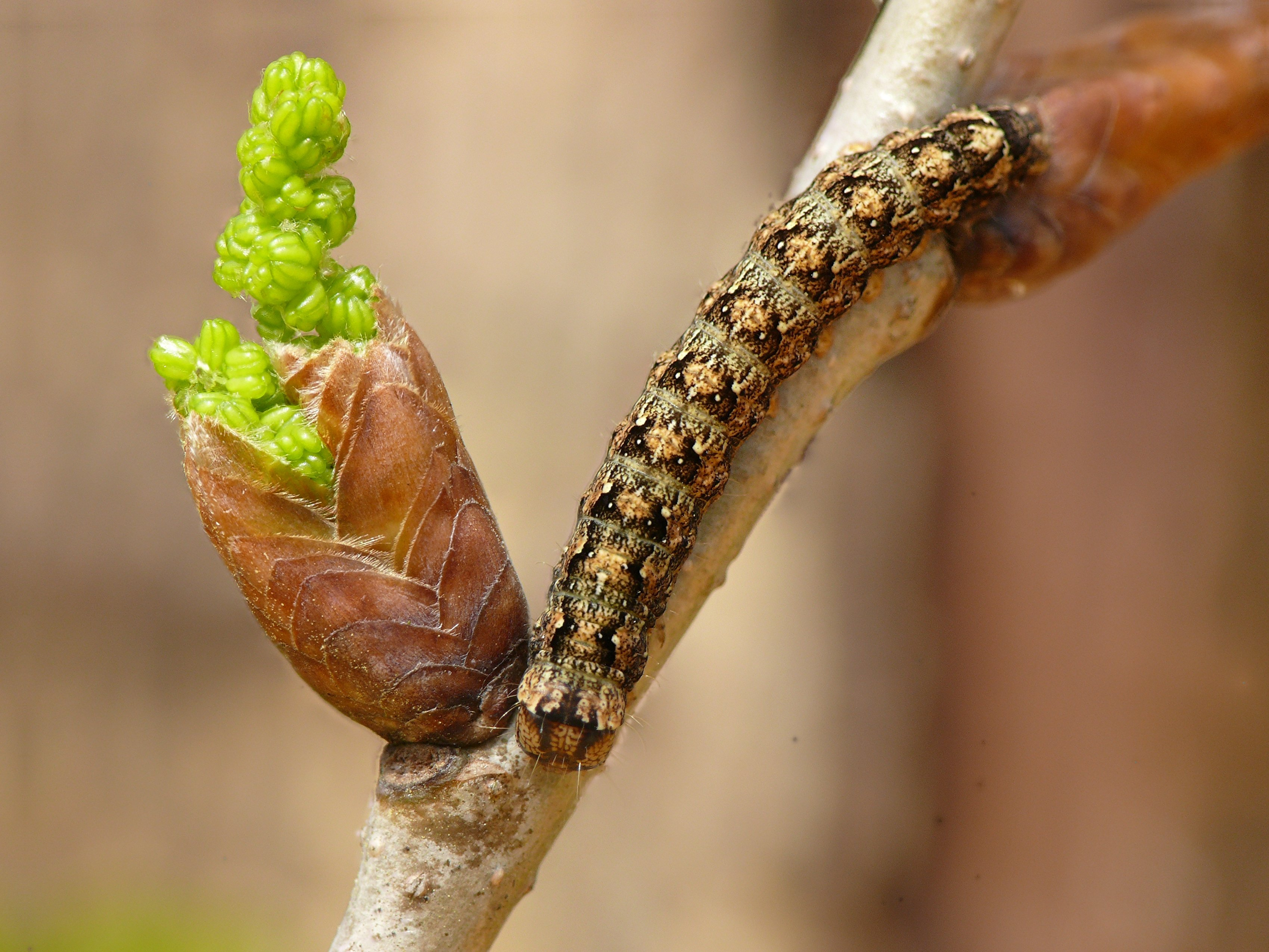
Merveille du jour caterpillar

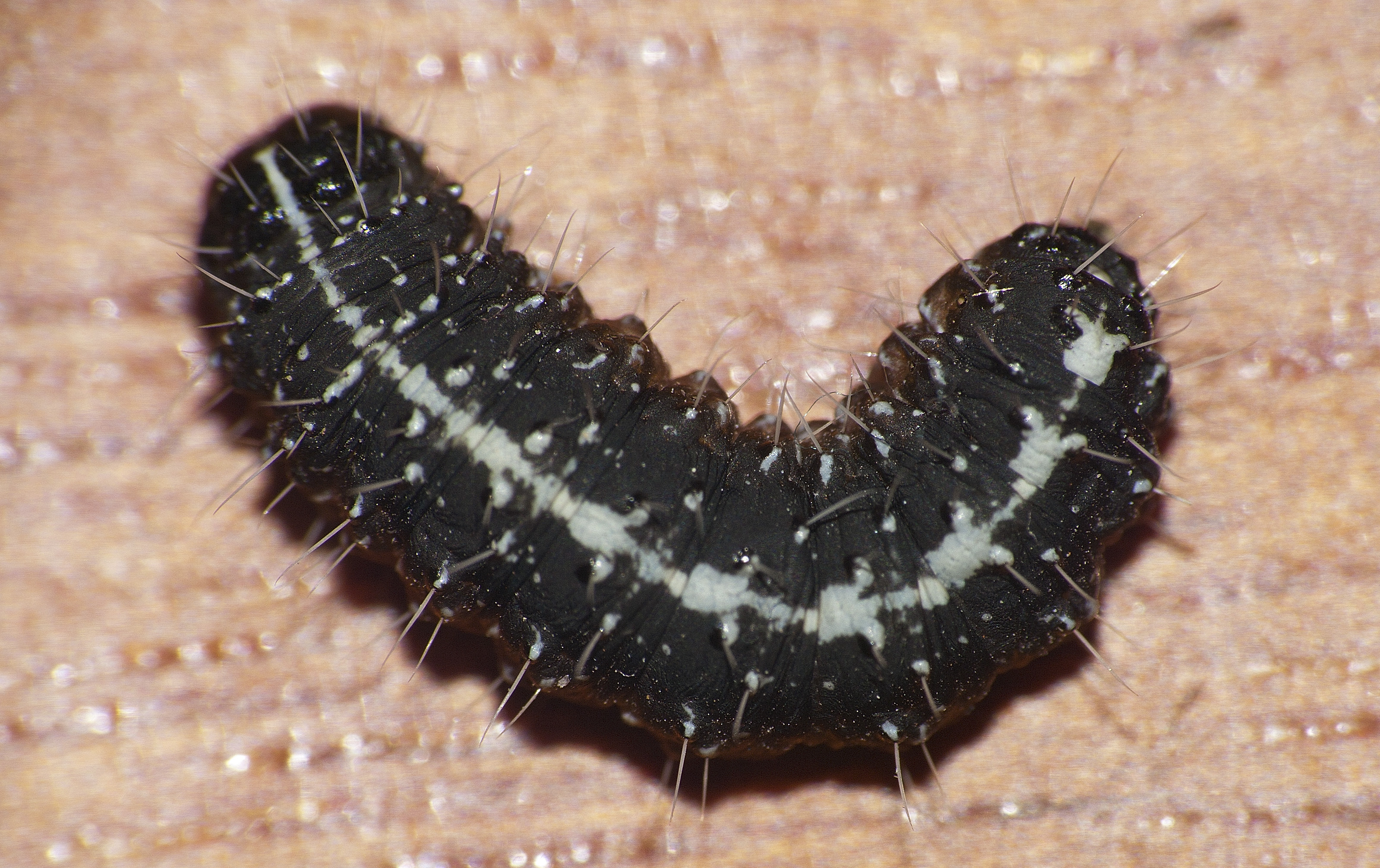
Marbled green caterpillar

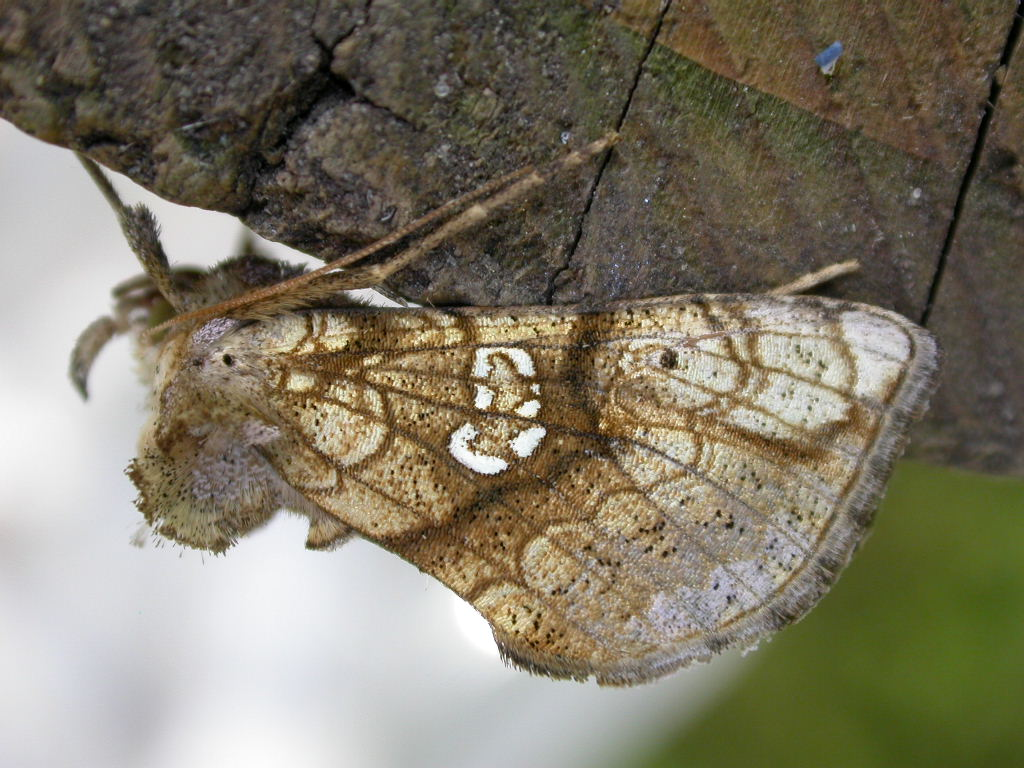
Golden plusia

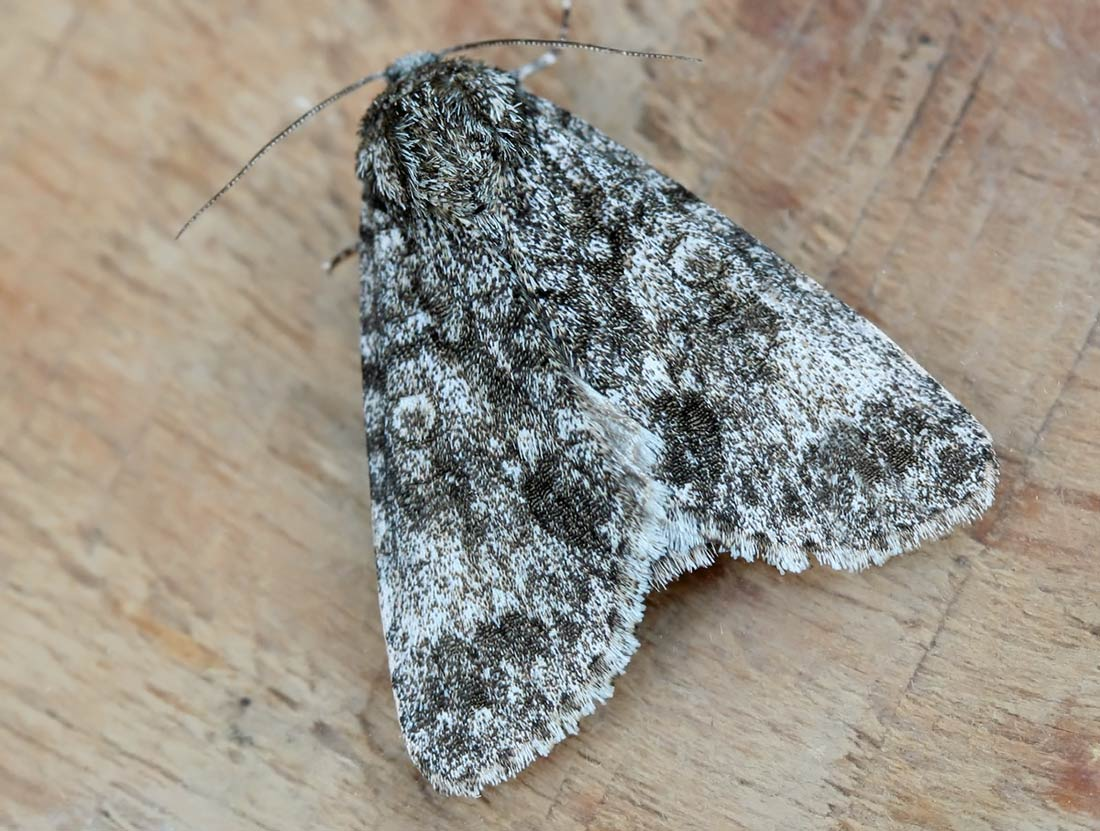
Poplar grey

- Abrostola tripartita (Hufnagel, 1766) (spectacle)
- Abrostola triplasia (Linnaeus, 1758) (dark spectacle)
- Acronicta auricoma ([Denis and Schiffermüller], 1775) (scarce dagger)
- Acronicta leporina (Linnaeus, 1758) (the miller)
- Acronicta alni (Linnaeus, 1767) (alder moth)
- Acronicta psi (Linnaeus, 1758) (grey dagger)
- Acronicta euphorbiae (Denis & Schiffermüller, 1775) (sweet gale moth)
- Acronicta menyanthidis (Esper, 1789) (light knot grass)
- Acronicta rumicis (Linnaeus, 1758) (knot grass)
- Actebia praecox (Linnaeus, 1758) (Portland moth)
- Agrochola lychnidis (Denis & Schiffermüller, 1775) (beaded chestnut)
- Agrochola helvola (Linnaeus, 1758) (flounced chestnut)
- Agrochola lunosa (Haworth, 1809) (lunar underwing)
- Agrochola lota (Clerck, 1759) (red-line quaker)
- Agrochola macilenta (Hübner, 1809) (yellow-line quaker)
- Agrochola circellaris (Hufnagel, 1766) (the brick)
- Agrotis cinerea (Denis & Schiffermüller, 1775) (light feathered rustic)
- Agrotis clavis (Hufnagel, 1766) (heart and club)
- Agrotis exclamationis (Linnaeus, 1758) (heart and dart)
- Agrotis ipsilon (Hufnagel, 1766) (dark sword-grass, black cutworm, greasy cutworm, floodplain cutworm)
- Agrotis ripae Hübner, 1823 (sand dart)
- Agrotis segetum (Denis & Schiffermüller, 1775) (turnip moth)
- Agrotis trux (Hübner, 1824) (crescent dart)
- Agrotis vestigialis (Hufnagel, 1766) (archer's dart)
- Allophyes oxyacanthae (Linnaeus, 1758) (green-brindled crescent)
- Amphipoea crinanensis (Burrows, 1908) (Crinan ear)
- Amphipoea fucosa (Freyer, 1830) (saltern ear moth)
- Amphipoea lucens (Freyer, 1845) (large ear moth)
- Amphipoea oculea (Linnaeus, 1761) (ear moth)
- Amphipyra berbera Rungs, 1949 (Svensson's copper underwing)
- Amphipyra pyramidea (Linnaeus, 1758) (copper underwing, humped green fruitworm, pyramidal green fruitworm)
- Amphipyra tragopoginis (Clerck, 1759) (mouse moth)
- Anaplectoides prasina (Denis & Schiffermüller, 1775) (green arches)
- Anarta myrtilli (Linnaeus, 1761) (beautiful yellow underwing)
- Anarta trifolii (Hufnagel, 1766) (nutmeg moth, clover cutworm)
- Antitype chi (Linnaeus, 1758) (grey chi)
- Apamea anceps (Denis & Schiffermüller, 1775) (large nutmeg)
- Apamea crenata (Hufnagel, 1766) (clouded brindle)
- Apamea epomidion (Haworth, 1809)
- Apamea furva (Denis & Schiffermüller, 1775) (confused moth)
- Apamea lithoxylaea (Denis & Schiffermüller, 1775) (light arches)
- Apamea monoglypha (Hufnagel, 1766) (dark arches)
- Apamea oblonga (Haworth, 1809) (crescent striped moth)
- Apamea remissa (Hübner, 1809) (dusky brocade)
- Apamea scolopacina (Esper, 1788) (slender brindle)
- Apamea sordens (Hufnagel, 1766) (rustic shoulder-knot, bordered apamea)
- Apamea sublustris (Esper, 1788) (reddish light arches)
- Apamea unanimis (Hübner, 1813) (small clouded brindle)
- Aporophyla australis (Boisduval, 1829) (feathered brindle)
- Aporophyla lueneburgensis (Freyer, 1848) (northern deep-brown dart)
- Aporophyla nigra (Haworth, 1809) (black rustic)
- Fissipunctia ypsillon (Denis & Schiffermüller, 1775) (dingy shears)
- Archanara dissoluta(Treitschke, 1825) (brown-veined wainscot moth)
- Asteroscopus sphinx (Hufnagel, 1766) (sprawler)
- Atethmia centrago (Haworth, 1809) (centre-barred sallow)
- Autographa bractea (Denis & Schiffermüller, 1775) (gold spangle)
- Autographa gamma (Linnaeus, 1758) (silver Y)
- Autographa jota (Linnaeus, 1758) (plain golden Y)
- Autographa pulchrina (Haworth, 1809) (beautiful golden Y)
- Axylia putris (Linnaeus, 1761) (the flame)
- Brachylomia viminalis (Fabricius, 1776) (minor shoulder-knot)
- Cryphia domestica (Hufnagel, 1766) (marbled beauty)
- Calamia tridens (Hufnagel, 1766) (Burren green)
- Caradrina morpheus(Hufnagel, 1766) (mottled rustic)
- Paradrina clavipalpis Scopoli, 1763 (pale mottled willow)
- Celaena haworthii (Curtis, 1829) (Haworth's minor)
- Ceramica pisi (Linnaeus, 1758) (broom moth)
- Cerapteryx graminis (Linnaeus, 1758) (antler moth)
- Cerastis rubricosa(Denis & Schiffermüller, 1775) (red chestnut)
- Charanyca trigrammica (Hufnagel, 1766) (treble lines)
- Rusina ferruginea (Esper, 1785) (brown rustic)
- Coenobia rufa (Haworth, 1809) (small rufous)
- Colocasia coryli (Linnaeus, 1758) (nut-tree tussock)
- Conisania andalusica (Staudinger, 1859) (Barrett's marbled coronet)
- Conistra ligula (Esper, 1791) (dark chestnut)
- Conistra vaccinii (Linnaeus, 1761) (chestnut moth)
- Cosmia trapezina (Linnaeus, 1758) (dun-bar)
- Craniophora ligustri (Denis & Schiffermüller, 1775) (coronet moth)
- Cucullia absinthii (Linnaeus, 1761) (wormwood moth)
- Cucullia calendulae Treitschke, 1835 (marigold shark)
- Cucullia chamomillae (Denis & Schiffermüller, 1775) (chamomile shark)
- Cucullia umbratica(Linnaeus, 1758) (shark moth)
- Cucullia verbasci (Linnaeus, 1758) (mullein moth)
- Dasypolia templi (Thunberg, 1792) (brindled ochre)
- Deltote bankiana (Fabricius, 1775) (silver barred)
- Lithacodia uncula (Clerck, 1759) (silver hook)
- Protodeltote pygarga (Hufnagel, 1766) (marbled white spot)
- Denticucullus pygmina (Haworth, 1809) (small wainscot moth)
- Diachrysia chrysitis (Linnaeus, 1758) (burnished brass)
- Diarsia brunnea (Denis & Schiffermüller, 1775) (purple clay)
- Diarsia dahlii (Hübner, 1813) (barred chestnut)
- Diarsia mendica (Fabricius, 1775) (ingrailed clay)
- Diarsia rubi (Vieweg, 1790) (small square-spot)
- Diloba caeruleocephala (Linnaeus, 1758) (figure-of-eight moth)
- Dryobotodes eremita (Fabricius, 1775) (brindled green)
- Egira conspicillaris (Linnaeus, 1758) (silver cloud)
- Enargia paleacea (Esper, 1788) (angle-striped sallow)
- Eugnorisma glareosa (Esper, 1788) (autumnal rustic)
- Euplexia lucipara (Linnaeus, 1758) (small angle shades)
- Eupsilia transversa (Hufnagel, 1766) (the satellite)
- Eurois occulta (Linnaeus, 1758) (great brocade, great gray dart)
- Euxoa cursoria(Hufnagel, 1766) (coast dart)
- Euxoa nigricans (Linnaeus, 1761) (garden dart)
- Euxoa nigrofusca (Esper, 1788) (white-line dart)
- Euxoa obelisca (Denis & Schiffermüller, 1775) (square-spot dart)
- Capsula algae (Esper, 1789) (rush wainscot moth)
- Capsula sparganii (Esper, 1790) (Webb's wainscot moth)
- Gortyna flavago (Denis & Schiffermüller, 1775) (frosted orange)
- Graphiphora augur (Fabricius, 1775) (double dart, soothsayer moth)
- Griposia aprilina (Linnaeus, 1758) (merveille du jour)
- Hada plebeja (Linnaeus, 1761) (shears moth)
- Hadena perplexa (Denis & Schiffermüller, 1775) (tawny shears, pod lover)
- Hadena bicruris(Hufnagel, 1766) (lychnis)
- Hadena caesia (Denis & Schiffermüller, 1775)
- Hadena confusa (Hufnagel, 1766) (marbled coronet)
- Hecatera bicolorata (Hufnagel, 1766) (broad-barred white)
- Hecatera dysodea (Denis & Schiffermüller, 1775) (small ranunculus)
- Helicoverpa armigera (Hübner, 1808) (scarce bordered straw, cotton bollworm, corn earworm, Old World bollworm, African bollworm)
- Heliothis nubigera (eastern bordered straw) (Herrich-Schäffer, 1851)
- Heliothis peltigera (Denis & Schiffermüller, 1775)
- Helotropha leucostigma (Hübner, 1808) (crescent moth)
- Hoplodrina ambigua) (Denis & Schiffermüller, 1775) (Vine’s rustic
- Hoplodrina blanda (Denis & Schiffermüller, 1775) (the rustic)
- Hoplodrina octogenaria (Goeze, 1781) (uncertain moth)
- Hydraecia micacea (Esper, 1789) (rosy rustic)
- Hyppa rectilinea (Esper, 1788) (Saxon moth)
- Ipimorpha subtusa (Denis & Schiffermüller, 1775) (olive moth)
- Lacanobia contigua (Denis & Schiffermüller, 1775) (beautiful brocade)
- Lacanobia suasa (Denis & Schiffermüller, 1775) (dog’s tooth moth)
- Lacanobia thalassina (Hufnagel, 1766) (pale-shouldered brocade)
- Lacanobia oleracea (Linnaeus, 1758) (bright-line brown-eye)
- Lacanobia w-latinum(Hufnagel, 1766) (light brocade)
- Apamea ophiogramma (Esper, 1794) (double lobed moth)
- Leucania loreyi (Duponchel, 1827) (false army worm)
- Leucania comma (Linnaeus, 1761) (shoulder-striped wainscot moth)
- Lithophane leautieri Boisduval, 1829 (Blair's shoulder-knot)
- Lithophane ornitopus (Hufnagel, 1766) (grey shoulder-knot)
- Lithophane semibrunnea (Haworth, 1809) (tawny pinion)
- Lithophane socia(Hufnagel, 1766) (pale pinion)
- Mesoligia literosa (Haworth, 1809) (rosy minor)
- Luperina nickerlii (Freyer, 1845) (sandhill rustic)
- Luperina testacea (Denis & Schiffermüller, 1775) (flounced rustic)
- Lycophotia porphyrea (Denis & Schiffermüller, 1775) (true lover's knot)
- Mamestra brassicae (Linnaeus, 1758) (cabbage moth)
- Melanchra persicariae (Linnaeus, 1761) (dot moth)
- Mesoligia furuncula (Denis & Schiffermüller, 1775) (cloaked minor)
- Mniotype adusta (Esper, 1790) (dark brocade)
- Mormo maura (Linnaeus, 1758) (old lady, black underwing)
- Mythimna albipuncta (Denis & Schiffermüller, 1775) (white-point)
- Mythimna ferrago (Fabricius, 1787) (the clay)
- Mythimna l-album (Linnaeus, 1767) (L-album wainscot moth)
- Mythimna litoralis (Curtis, 1827) (shore wainscot)
- Mythimna conigera (Denis & Schiffermüller, 1775) (brown-line bright-eye)
- Mythimna impura (Hübner, 1808) (smoky wainscot moth)
- Mythimna pallens (Linnaeus, 1758) (common wainscot moth)
- Mythimna pudorina (Denis & Schiffermüller, 1775) (striped wainscot moth)
- Mythimna straminea (Treitschke, 1825) (southern wainscot moth)
- Mythimna turca (Linnaeus, 1761) (double line)
- Mythimna vitellina (Hübner, 1808) (the delicate)
- Mythimna unipuncta (Haworth, 1809) (true armyworm moth, white-speck moth, common armyworm)
- Naenia typica (Linnaeus, 1758) (the Gothic)
- Noctua comes Hübner, 1813 (lesser yellow underwing)
- Noctua fimbriata (Schreber, 1759) (broad-bordered yellow underwing)
- Noctua interjecta Hübner, 1803 (least yellow underwing)
- Noctua janthe (Borkhausen, 1792) (lesser broad-bordered yellow underwing)
- Noctua pronuba (Linnaeus, 1758) (large yellow underwing)
- Nonagria typhae (Thunberg, 1784) (bulrush wainscot moth)
- Nyctobrya muralis (Forster, 1771) (marbled green)
- Ochropleura leucogaster (Freyer, 1831) (Radford's flame shoulder)
- Ochropleura plecta (Linnaeus, 1761) (flame shoulder)
- Oligia fasciuncula (Haworth, 1809) (middle-barred minor)
- Oligia latruncula (Denis & Schiffermüller, 1775) (tawny marbled minor)
- Oligia strigilis (Linnaeus, 1758) (marbled minor)
- Oligia versicolor (Borkhausen, 1792) (rufous minor)
- Orthosia gracilis (Denis & Schiffermüller, 1775) (powdered Quaker)
- Orthosia cerasi (Fabricius, 1775) (common Quaker)
- Orthosia cruda (Denis & Schiffermüller, 1775) (small Quaker)
- Orthosia miniosa (Denis & Schiffermüller, 1775) (blossom underwing)
- Orthosia incerta (Hufnagel, 1766) (clouded drab)
- Orthosia gothica (Linnaeus, 1758) (Hebrew character)
- Orthosia opima (Hübner, 1809) (northern drab)
- Pachetra sagittigera (Hufnagel, 1766) (feathered ear)
- Panemeria tenebrata (Scopoli, 1763) (small yellow underwing)
- Panolis flammea (pine beauty) (Denis & Schiffermüller, 1775)
- Papestra biren (glaucous shears) (Goeze, 1781)
- Parastichtis suspecta (the suspected) (Hübner, 1817)
- Peridroma saucia (pearly underwing, variegated cutworm) (Hübner, 1808)
- Perigrapha munda (twin-spotted Quaker) (Denis & Schiffermüller, 1775)
- Phlogophora meticulosa (angle shades) (Linnaeus, 1758)
- Photedes captiuncula (Treitschke, 1825) (least minor)
- Photedes minima (Haworth, 1809) (small dotted buff)
- Plusia festucae (Linnaeus, 1758) (gold spot)
- Plusia putnami Grote, 1873 (Lempke's gold spot)
- Polia bombycina(Hufnagel, 1766) (pale shining brown)
- Polia nebulosa (Hufnagel, 1766) (grey arches)
- Polychrysia moneta (Fabricius, 1787) (golden plusia)
- Polymixis lichenea (Hübner, 1813) (feathered ranunculus)
- Polymixis xanthomista (Hübner, 1819) (black-banded polymixis)
- Polymixis flavicincta (Denis & Schiffermüller, 1775) (large ranunculus)
- Protoschinia scutosa (Denis & Schiffermüller, 1775) (spotted clover)
- Pyrrhia umbra (Hufnagel, 1766) (bordered sallow)
- Rhizedra lutosa (Hübner, 1803) (large wainscot, Isle of Wight wainscot)
- Rhyacia simulans (Hufnagel, 1766) (dotted rustic)
- Sideridis rivularis (Fabricius, 1775) (campion)
- Sideridis reticulata (Goeze, 1781) (bordered Gothic)
- Sideridis turbida (Esper, 1790) (white colon)
- Spodoptera exigua (Hübner, 1808) (beet armyworm, small mottled willow moth, asparagus fern caterpillar)
- Spodoptera cilium Guenée, 1852 (dark mottled willow, lawn caterpillar, grasslawn armyworm)
- Standfussiana lucernea (Linnaeus, 1758) (northern rustic)
- Stilbia anomala (Haworth, 1812) (false footman, anomalous)
- Acronicta megacephala (Denis & Schiffermüller, 1775) (poplar grey)
- Syngrapha interrogationis (Linnaeus, 1758) (scarce silver Y)
- Thalpophila matura (Hufnagel, 1766) (straw underwing)
- Tholera cespitis (Denis & Schiffermüller, 1775) (hedge rustic)
- Tholera decimalis (Poda, 1761) (feathered Gothic)
- Tiliacea citrago (Linnaeus, 1758) (orange sallow)
- Thysanoplusia daubei (Boisduval, 1840) (boathouse gem)
- Thysanoplusia orichalcea (Fabricius, 1775) (slender burnished brass)
- Trichoplusia ni (Hübner, 1803) (cabbage looper)
- Trigonophora flammea (Esper, 1785) (flame brocade)
- Xanthia aurago (Denis & Schiffermüller, 1775) (barred sallow)
- Xanthia icteritia (Hufnagel, 1766) (sallow moth)
- Xanthia togata (Esper, 1788) (pink-barred sallow)
- Xestia agathina (Esper, 1790) (heath rustic)
- Xestia baja Denis & Schiffermüller, 1775 (dotted clay)
- Xestia c-nigrum (Linnaeus, 1758) (setaceous Hebrew character)

====== Family Nolidae (tuft moths) ======
- Earias clorana Linnaeus, 1758 (cream-bordered green pea)
- Meganola albula Denis & Schiffermüller, 1775 (Kent black arches)
- Nycteola revayana (Scopoli, 1772) (oak nycteoline)
- Pseudoips prasinana (Linnaeus, 1758) (green silver-lines)

====== Family Notodontidae (prominents, kitten moths) ======
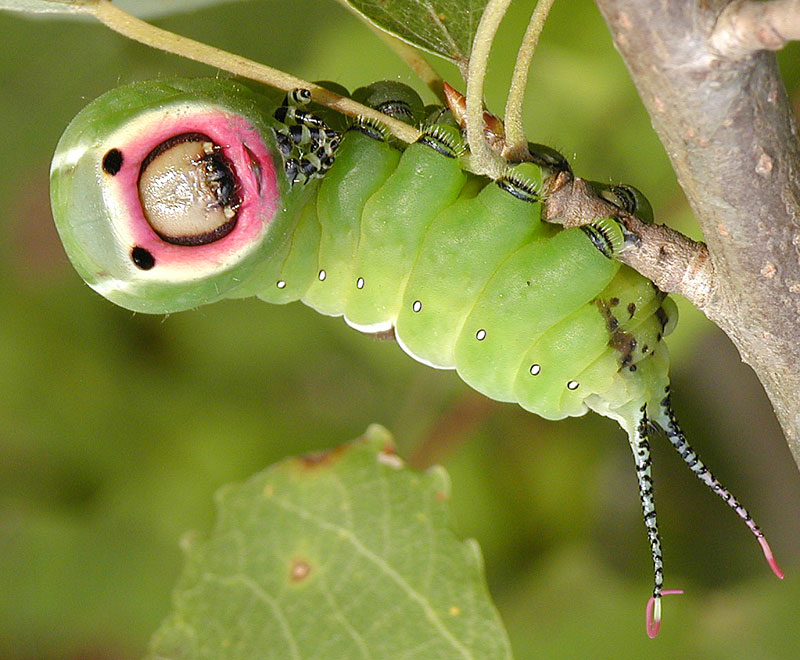
Puss moth caterpillar

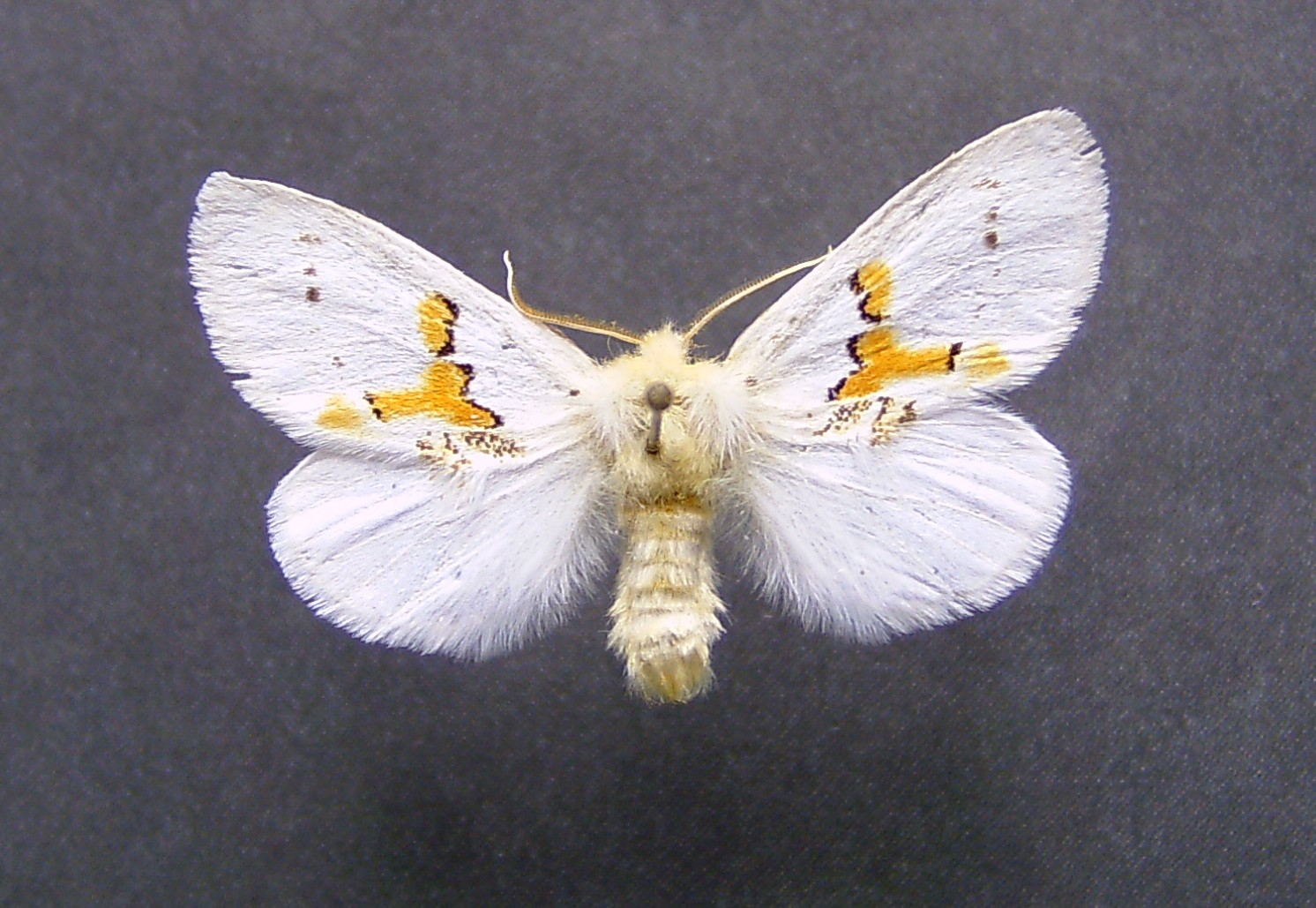
White prominent

- Cerura vinula (Linnaeus, 1758) (puss moth)
- Clostera pigra (Hüfnagel, 1766) (small chocolate-tip)
- Drymonia dodonaea (Denis & Schiffermüller, 1775) (marbled brown)
- Drymonia ruficornis (Hübner, 1819) (lunar marbled brown)
- Furcula bifida (Brahm, 1787) (poplar kitten)
- Furcula furcula (Clerck, 1759) (sallow kitten)
- Leucodonta bicoloria (Linnaeus, 1767) (white prominent)
- Notodonta dromedarius (Linnaeus, 1758) (iron prominent)
- Notodonta ziczac (Linnaeus, 1758) (pebble prominent)
- Odontosia carmelita (Esper, 1799) (scarce prominent)
- Phalera bucephala (Linnaeus, 1758) (buff-tip)
- Pheosia gnoma (Fabricius, 1776) (lesser swallow prominent)
- Pheosia tremula (Linnaeus, 1758) (swallow prominent)
- Pterostoma palpina Clerck, 1759) (pale prominent)
- Ptilodon capucina (Linnaeus, 1758) (coxcomb prominent)
- Stauropus fagi (Linnaeus, 1758) (lobster moth, lobster prominent)

== See also ==
- List of butterflies of Ireland

== Literature ==
- Major works
- De Prins, W., and Steeman, C. 2012. Catalogue of the Lepidoptera of Belgium provides bibliography of key literature for identification

== See also ==
- Robinson, G. S., P. R. Ackery, I. J. Kitching, G. W. Beccaloni & L. M. Hernández, 2010. HOSTS – A Database of the World's Lepidopteran Hostplants. Natural History Museum, London. http://www.nhm.ac.uk/hosts. (Accessed: 18 Aug.2010
- Richard South The Moths of the British Isles Series One and Series Two online Full text and plates of Series One and Series One. The plates are superior to those of later editions.
- Adalbert Seitz Die Großschmetterlinge der Erde, Verlag Alfred Kernen, Stuttgart Band 4 Geometrae Die Großschmetterlinge des palaearktischen Faunengebietes, Die palaearktischen Spinner und Schwärmer, 1912–1913 in English translation online online at Zobodat
- Adalbert Seitz Die Großschmetterlinge der Erde, Verlag Alfred Kernen, Stuttgart BHL All Palearctic volumes (in English) and plates.
- Meyrick, E., 1895 A Handbook of British Lepidoptera MacMillan, London pdf Keys and description

Other languages. Accounts of species are often more complete on

- de.wikipedia (German language)
- fr.wikipedia.(French language)
- it.wikipedia. Italian language)
- Identification key
