= List of moths of Australia (Adelidae) =

Partial list of Australian moths

This is a list of the Australian species of the family Adelidae. It also acts as an index to the species articles and forms part of the full List of moths of Australia.

== Adelinae ==
- Nemophora brachypetala (Meyrick, 1912)
- Nemophora laurella (Newman, 1856)
- Nemophora opalina (Meyrick, 1912)
- Nemophora panaeola (Turner, 1913)
- Nemophora polydaedala (Turner, 1913)
- Nemophora selasphora (Turner, 1913)
- Nemophora sparsella Walker, 1863
- Nemophora topazias (Meyrick, 1893)

== Nematopogoninae ==
- Ceromitia autoscia (Meyrick, 1906)
- Ceromitia iolampra (Turner, 1900)
- Ceromitia leptosticta (Turner, 1900)
