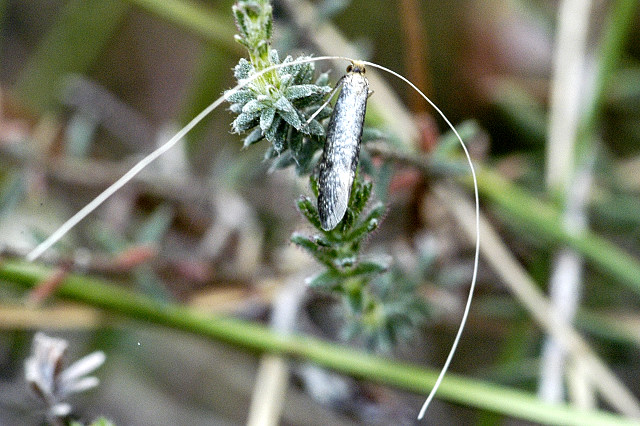
- Male
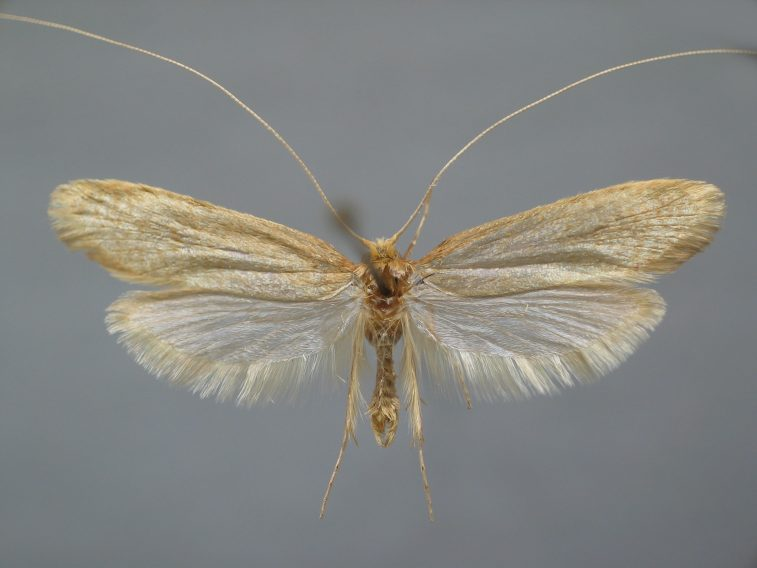

Scientific classification
- Kingdom: Animalia
- Phylum: Arthropoda
- Clade: Pancrustacea
- Class: Insecta
- Order: Lepidoptera
- Family: Adelidae
- Genus: Nematopogon
- Species: N. swammerdamella

Binomial name
- Nematopogon swammerdamella (Linnaeus, 1758)

Synonyms
- Phalaena swammerdamella Linnaeus, 1758; Nematopogon swammerdamellus (lapsus); Nemophora reaumurella Peyerimhoff, 1870

= Nematopogon swammerdamella =

Species of moth

Nematopogon swammerdamella is a moth of the family Adelidae.

== Description ==
A medium-sized, brownish-yellow moth with long antennae. It is the largest of the Nematopogon species found in North Europe, and can otherwise be recognized by the fact that the forewing is rather pronounced triangular (more rounded in the other species). In addition, it begins to fly earlier in the spring than the other species in the genus. However, one often has to examine the genitalia to determine the species with certainty. The antennae are filamentous, yellowish, about two and a half times as long as the forewing in the male and about 1.8 times as long in the female. The head, forebody and forewing are ochre-yellow. The forewing is relatively wide and has a pronounced tip and hind corner, so that it becomes distinctly triangular. The wing fringes are yellowish, paler than the wing. The hind wing is grey with pale grey wing fringes. The tip may be slightly brownish.Meyrick - The moth has long, pale shining ochreous, faintly darker strigulated forewings and long antennae. The hindwings are pale grey; cilia whitish-ochreous. Head orange, face whitish. The wingspan is 17–21 mm. To certainly determine the species of the genus Nematopogon dissection and study of the genitalia is necessary.

The moth flies from late April to June. The moth is only active in the late afternoon and dusk. Nematopogon schwarziellus, Nematopogon pilella, and Nematopogon metaxella are similar to this species.

== Habitat and range ==
It is found throughout most of Europe, except the Balkan Peninsula, Greece, Iceland and Ukraine. It can commonly be found throughout the British Isles in woodland. The species has also been known to live in hedgerows, moorland, heathland, and other open habitats.

== Caterpillars ==
The caterpillars feed on decaying plant matter and various herbaceous plants. Older caterpillars live in a bivalved case on the ground. They hibernate twice and pupate inside the case.

== Etymology ==
The name honours the Dutch scientist Jan Swammerdam.
