= Ceromitia systelitis =

Scientific classification
- Kingdom: Animalia
- Phylum: Arthropoda
- Class: Insecta
- Order: Lepidoptera
- Family: Adelidae
- Genus: Ceromitia
- Species: C. systelitis

Binomial name
- Ceromitia systelitis Meyrick, 1921

Species of moth

Ceromitia systelitis is a species of moth of the family Adelidae. It is known from the Republic of Congo and Mozambique.
