= Ceromitia decepta =

Scientific classification
- Kingdom: Animalia
- Phylum: Arthropoda
- Class: Insecta
- Order: Lepidoptera
- Family: Adelidae
- Genus: Ceromitia
- Species: C. decepta

Binomial name
- Ceromitia decepta Janse, 1945

Species of moth

Ceromitia decepta is a species of moth of the family Adelidae. It is known from South Africa.
