= Ceromitia sciographa =

Scientific classification
- Kingdom: Animalia
- Phylum: Arthropoda
- Class: Insecta
- Order: Lepidoptera
- Family: Adelidae
- Genus: Ceromitia
- Species: C. sciographa

Binomial name
- Ceromitia sciographa Meyrick, 1922

Species of moth

Ceromitia sciographa is a moth of the family Adelidae or fairy longhorn moths. It was described by Edward Meyrick in 1922. It is found in Brazil (Óbidos, Pará).
