= Ceromitia schajovskoii =

Scientific classification
- Kingdom: Animalia
- Phylum: Arthropoda
- Class: Insecta
- Order: Lepidoptera
- Family: Adelidae
- Genus: Ceromitia
- Species: C. schajovskoii

Binomial name
- Ceromitia schajovskoii Pastrana, 1961

Synonyms
- Green longhorn moth

Species of moth

Ceromitia schajovskoii is a moth of the Adelidae family or fairy longhorn moths. It was described by Pastrana in 1961. It is found in Argentina.
