= Ceromitia brevilobata =

Scientific classification
- Kingdom: Animalia
- Phylum: Arthropoda
- Clade: Pancrustacea
- Class: Insecta
- Order: Lepidoptera
- Family: Adelidae
- Genus: Ceromitia
- Species: C. brevilobata

Binomial name
- Ceromitia brevilobata (Janse, 1945)

Species of moth

Ceromitia brevilobata is a species of moth of the family Adelidae. It is known from South Africa.
