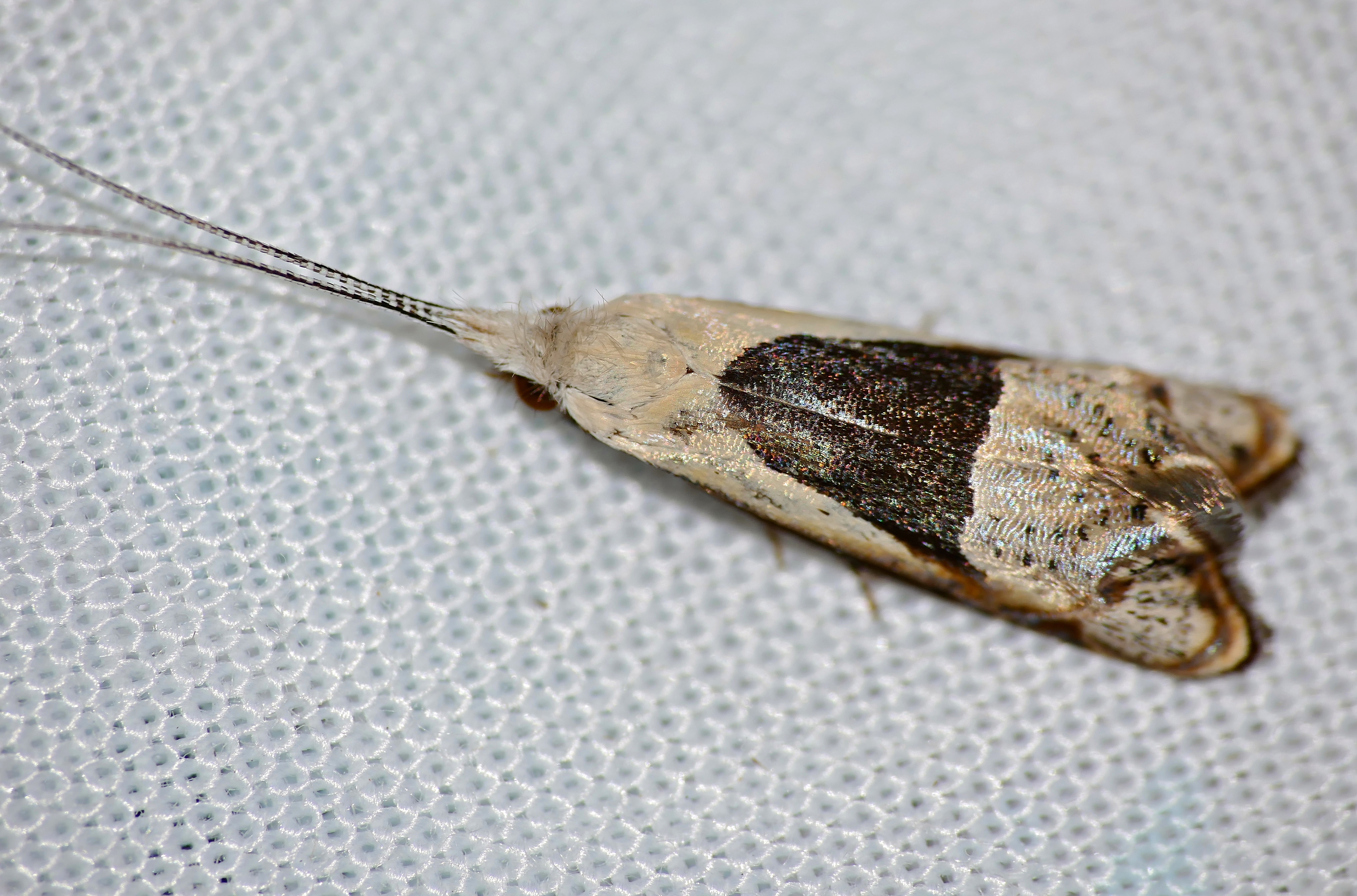
- Ceromitia trigoniferella

Scientific classification
- Kingdom: Animalia
- Phylum: Arthropoda
- Class: Insecta
- Order: Lepidoptera
- Family: Adelidae
- Genus: Ceromitia
- Species: C. trigoniferella

Binomial name
- Ceromitia trigoniferella (Walsingham, 1881)

Synonyms
- Nemophora trigoniferella Walsingham, 1881

= Ceromitia trigoniferella =

Species of moth

Ceromitia trigoniferella is a species of moth of the family Adelidae. It is known from Kenya, South Africa and Zimbabwe.
