= Ceromitia iolitha =

Scientific classification
- Kingdom: Animalia
- Phylum: Arthropoda
- Class: Insecta
- Order: Lepidoptera
- Family: Adelidae
- Genus: Ceromitia
- Species: C. iolitha

Binomial name
- Ceromitia iolitha Meyrick, 1914

Species of moth

Ceromitia iolitha is a moth of the family Adelidae or fairy longhorn moths. It was described by Edward Meyrick in 1914. It is found in Africa.
