= Ceromitia chrysomitra =

Scientific classification
- Kingdom: Animalia
- Phylum: Arthropoda
- Class: Insecta
- Order: Lepidoptera
- Family: Adelidae
- Genus: Ceromitia
- Species: C. chrysomitra

Binomial name
- Ceromitia chrysomitra Meyrick, 1937

Species of moth

Ceromitia chrysomitra is a moth belonging to the family Adelidae or fairy longhorn moths. It was first described by Edward Meyrick in 1937. This species is usually found in Uganda and Kenya.
