= Ceromitia melanodesma =

Scientific classification
- Kingdom: Animalia
- Phylum: Arthropoda
- Class: Insecta
- Order: Lepidoptera
- Family: Adelidae
- Genus: Ceromitia
- Species: C. melanodesma

Binomial name
- Ceromitia melanodesma Meyrick, 1914

Species of moth

Ceromitia melanodesma is a species of moth of the Adelidae family. It is known from Malawi and Zimbabwe, South Africa.
