= Ceromitia macrograpta =

Scientific classification
- Kingdom: Animalia
- Phylum: Arthropoda
- Class: Insecta
- Order: Lepidoptera
- Family: Adelidae
- Genus: Ceromitia
- Species: C. macrograpta

Binomial name
- Ceromitia macrograpta Meyrick, 1934

Species of moth

Ceromitia macrograpta is a moth of the family Adelidae or fairy longhorn moths. It was described by Edward Meyrick in 1934. It is found in Congo.
