= Ceromitia pilularis =

Scientific classification
- Kingdom: Animalia
- Phylum: Arthropoda
- Class: Insecta
- Order: Lepidoptera
- Family: Adelidae
- Genus: Ceromitia
- Species: C. pilularis

Binomial name
- Ceromitia pilularis Meyrick, 1921

Synonyms
- Ceromitia rixata Meyrick, 1924

Species of moth

Ceromitia pilularis is a species of moth of the family Adelidae. It is known from Zimbabwe.
