= Ceromitia centrologa =

Scientific classification
- Kingdom: Animalia
- Phylum: Arthropoda
- Clade: Pancrustacea
- Class: Insecta
- Order: Lepidoptera
- Family: Adelidae
- Genus: Ceromitia
- Species: C. centrologa

Binomial name
- Ceromitia centrologa Meyrick, 1937

Species of moth

Ceromitia centrologa is a species of moth of the family Adelidae. It is known to live in South Africa.
