= Ceromitia chalcocapna =

Scientific classification
- Kingdom: Animalia
- Phylum: Arthropoda
- Class: Insecta
- Order: Lepidoptera
- Family: Adelidae
- Genus: Ceromitia
- Species: C. chalcocapna

Binomial name
- Ceromitia chalcocapna Meyrick, 1933

Species of moth

Ceromitia chalcocapna is a moth of the family Adelidae or fairy longhorn moths. It is found in Congo.
