= Ceromitia synneura =

Scientific classification
- Kingdom: Animalia
- Phylum: Arthropoda
- Class: Insecta
- Order: Lepidoptera
- Family: Adelidae
- Genus: Ceromitia
- Species: C. synneura

Binomial name
- Ceromitia synneura Meyrick, 1921

Species of moth

Ceromitia synneura is a species of moth of the Adelidae family. It is known from Zimbabwe.
