= Ceromitia praetexta =

Scientific classification
- Kingdom: Animalia
- Phylum: Arthropoda
- Class: Insecta
- Order: Lepidoptera
- Family: Adelidae
- Genus: Ceromitia
- Species: C. praetexta

Binomial name
- Ceromitia praetexta Meyrick, 1924

Species of moth

Ceromitia praetexta is a species of moth of the family Adelidae. It is known from South Africa.
