= Ceromitia ingeminans =

Scientific classification
- Kingdom: Animalia
- Phylum: Arthropoda
- Class: Insecta
- Order: Lepidoptera
- Family: Adelidae
- Genus: Ceromitia
- Species: C. ingeminans

Binomial name
- Ceromitia ingeminans Meyrick, 1935

Species of moth

Ceromitia ingeminans is a moth of the family Adelidae or fairy longhorn moths. It was described by Edward Meyrick in 1935. It is found in Congo.
