= Nematopogon magna =

Scientific classification
- Kingdom: Animalia
- Phylum: Arthropoda
- Clade: Pancrustacea
- Class: Insecta
- Order: Lepidoptera
- Family: Adelidae
- Genus: Nematopogon
- Species: N. magna

Binomial name
- Nematopogon magna (Zeller, 1878)

Synonyms
- Nemophora magna Zeller, 1878; Nematopogon magnus; Nemophora variella Brandt, 1937; Nematopogon variella; Nematopogon variellus

Species of moth

Nematopogon magna is a moth of the Adelidae family. It is found in Ireland, Great Britain, Denmark, Germany, Switzerland, Austria, Fennoscandia, the Baltic region and northern Russia.

The wingspan is 17–18 mm. The mid brown (darker than other Nematopogon) forewing is reticulated.It may resemble Nematopogon robertellus, but is often slightly larger and darker. To certainly determine the species of the genus Nematopogon dissection and study of the genitalia is necessary. The antennae are wire-shaped and yellowish, in the male about two and a half times as long as the forewing, in the female about twice as long. The head is clasped with yellow, protruding, hair-like shells. The forewing is dark grey-brown, in the outer part with a clear mesh pattern. The hindwing is grey. External image

A moorland and wooded heathland species especially around Vaccinium myrtillus. The larvae feed on dead leaves. They live within a movable case.
