= Ceromitia indigna =

Scientific classification
- Kingdom: Animalia
- Phylum: Arthropoda
- Class: Insecta
- Order: Lepidoptera
- Family: Adelidae
- Genus: Ceromitia
- Species: C. indigna

Binomial name
- Ceromitia indigna (Meyrick, 1912)

Synonyms
- Ulometra indigna Meyrick, 1912

Species of moth

Ceromitia indigna is a species of moth of the family Adelidae. It is known from South Africa.
