= Ceromitia eremarcha =

Scientific classification
- Kingdom: Animalia
- Phylum: Arthropoda
- Class: Insecta
- Order: Lepidoptera
- Family: Adelidae
- Genus: Ceromitia
- Species: C. eremarcha

Binomial name
- Ceromitia eremarcha Meyrick, 1931

Species of moth

Ceromitia eremarcha is a moth of the family Adelidae or fairy longhorn moths. It was described by Edward Meyrick in 1931. It is found in Paraguay.
