= Ceromitia cuneella =

Scientific classification
- Kingdom: Animalia
- Phylum: Arthropoda
- Class: Insecta
- Order: Lepidoptera
- Family: Adelidae
- Genus: Ceromitia
- Species: C. cuneella

Binomial name
- Ceromitia cuneella Walsingham, 1891

Species of moth

Ceromitia cuneella is a moth of the family Adelidae or fairy longhorn moths. It was described by Walsingham in 1891. It is found in South Africa.
