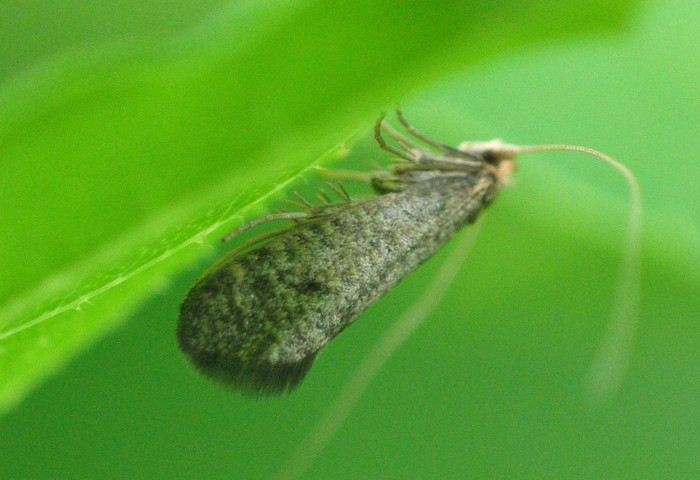

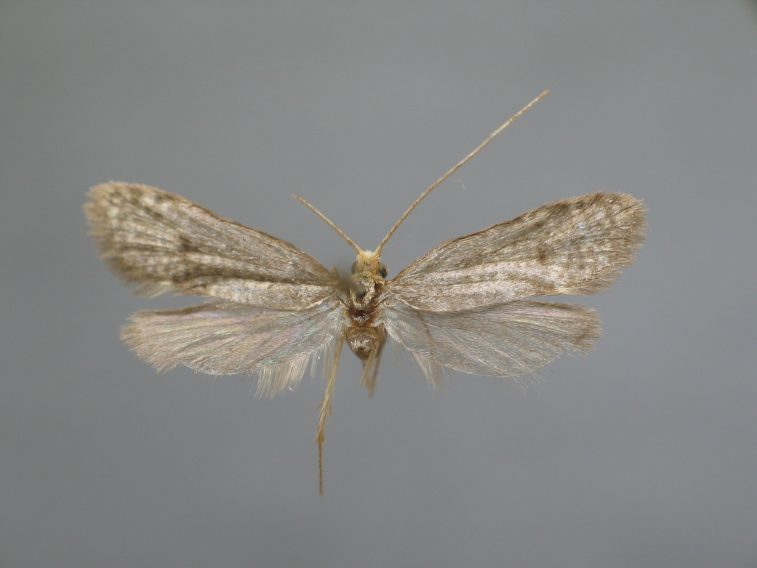

Scientific classification
- Kingdom: Animalia
- Phylum: Arthropoda
- Class: Insecta
- Order: Lepidoptera
- Family: Adelidae
- Genus: Nematopogon
- Species: N. robertella

Binomial name
- Nematopogon robertella (Clerck, 1759)

Synonyms
- Tinea pilulella Hübner, 1813; Nematopogon pilulella Nematopogon robertellus (lapsus)

= Nematopogon robertella =

Species of moth

Nematopogon robertella is a moth of the family Adelidae. It is found in Europe.

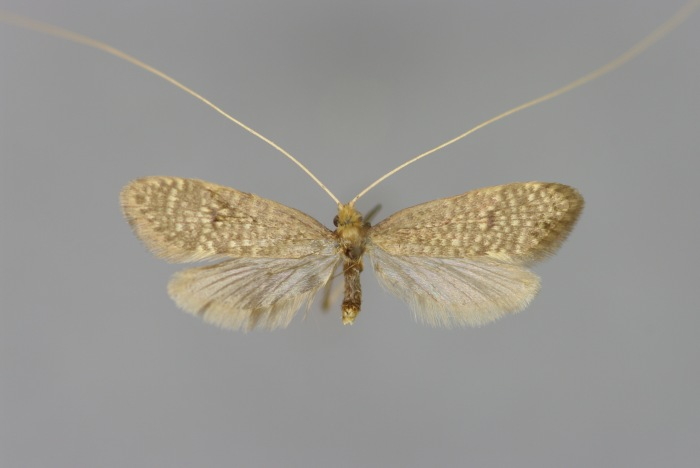
Male from Kamniske Planine, Slovenia

== Description ==
The wingspan is 14–16 mm.It is a brown-grey moth with long antennae. The dark wings have a clear mesh pattern just to the wing base and the head is not yellow. The antennae are wire-shaped and white, in the male about three times the length of the forewing, in the female about twice as long. The head is brownish, the body and the forewing are brownish grey. The forewing has clear mesh patterns on the entire wing surface, this is the best characteristic of the species. There is also a diffuse, bright spot at the tornus. The wingspans and hindwing are rather dark grey. The larva is white, slightly yellowish or reddish.

== Similar species ==
- Nematopogon magna

To certainly determine the species of the genus Nematopogon dissection and study of the genitalia is necessary.

== Biology ==
The moth flies from late May to June depending on the location.

The larvae feed on bilberry.
