= Ceromitia elongatella =

Scientific classification
- Kingdom: Animalia
- Phylum: Arthropoda
- Class: Insecta
- Order: Lepidoptera
- Family: Adelidae
- Genus: Ceromitia
- Species: C. elongatella

Binomial name
- Ceromitia elongatella (Walsingham, 1881)

Synonyms
- Nemophora elongatella Walsingham, 1881; Ceromitia somphodes Meyrick, 1912

Species of moth

Ceromitia elongatella is a species of moth of the Adelidae family. It is known from South Africa.
