= Ceromitia chionocrossa =

Scientific classification
- Kingdom: Animalia
- Phylum: Arthropoda
- Class: Insecta
- Order: Lepidoptera
- Family: Adelidae
- Genus: Ceromitia
- Species: C. chionocrossa

Binomial name
- Ceromitia chionocrossa Meyrick, 1922

Species of moth

Ceromitia chionocrossa is a moth of the family Adelidae or fairy longhorn moths. It was described by Edward Meyrick in 1922. It is found in Brazil, (Rio Trombetas, Pará).
