= Ceromitia alternipunctella =

Scientific classification
- Kingdom: Animalia
- Phylum: Arthropoda
- Class: Insecta
- Order: Lepidoptera
- Family: Adelidae
- Genus: Ceromitia
- Species: C. alternipunctella

Binomial name
- Ceromitia alternipunctella (Walsingham, 1881)

Synonyms
- Nemophora alternipunctella Walsingham, 1881

Species of moth

Ceromitia alternipunctella is a species of moth of the family Adelidae. It is known from South Africa.
