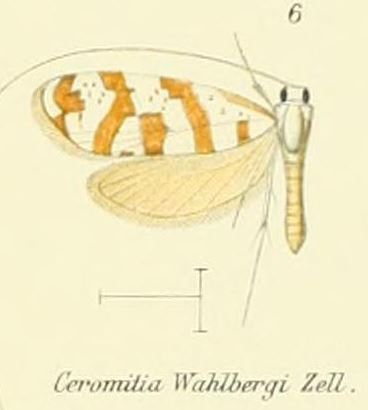

Scientific classification
- Kingdom: Animalia
- Phylum: Arthropoda
- Clade: Pancrustacea
- Class: Insecta
- Order: Lepidoptera
- Family: Adelidae
- Genus: Ceromitia
- Species: C. wahlbergi

Binomial name
- Ceromitia wahlbergi Zeller, 1852

= Ceromitia wahlbergi =

Species of moth

Ceromitia wahlbergi is a species of moth of the family Adelidae. It is known from South Africa.
