= Ceromitia phaeocoma =

Scientific classification
- Kingdom: Animalia
- Phylum: Arthropoda
- Class: Insecta
- Order: Lepidoptera
- Family: Adelidae
- Genus: Ceromitia
- Species: C. phaeocoma

Binomial name
- Ceromitia phaeocoma Meyrick, 1912

Synonyms
- Ceromitia mesosema Meyrick, 1921

Species of moth

Ceromitia phaeocoma is a species of moth of the family Adelidae. It is known from Zimbabwe.
