= Ceromitia turpisella =

Scientific classification
- Kingdom: Animalia
- Phylum: Arthropoda
- Class: Insecta
- Order: Lepidoptera
- Family: Adelidae
- Genus: Ceromitia
- Species: C. turpisella

Binomial name
- Ceromitia turpisella (Walker, 1863)

Synonyms
- Nemophora turpisella Walker, 1863; Agisana caffrariella Möschler, 1883; Ceromitia caffrariella; Ceromitia flavicoma Meyrick, 1937

Species of moth

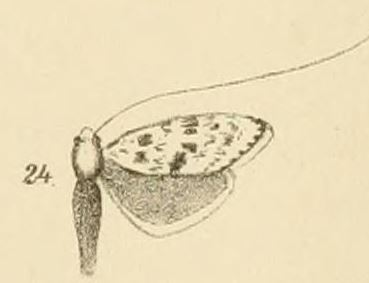
Ceromitia turpisella

Ceromitia turpisella, the dusted longhorn, is a species of moth of the family Adelidae. It is known from South Africa and Zimbabwe. It is found in a wide range of habitats and is common in semi-arid areas.
