= Nematopogon dorsigutellus =

Scientific classification
- Kingdom: Animalia
- Phylum: Arthropoda
- Class: Insecta
- Order: Lepidoptera
- Family: Adelidae
- Genus: Nematopogon
- Species: N. dorsigutellus

Binomial name
- Nematopogon dorsigutellus Erschoff, 1877

Synonyms
- Nematopogon dorsigutella

Species of moth

Nematopogon dorsigutellus is a moth of the Adelidae family or fairy longhorn moths. It was described by Nikolay Grigoryevich Erschoff in 1877. It is found from Siberia to Japan, Korea and northern China.
