= Ceromitia crinigerella =

Scientific classification
- Kingdom: Animalia
- Phylum: Arthropoda
- Clade: Pancrustacea
- Class: Insecta
- Order: Lepidoptera
- Family: Adelidae
- Genus: Ceromitia
- Species: C. crinigerella

Binomial name
- Ceromitia crinigerella (Zeller, 1850)

Synonyms
- Nemophora crinigerella Zeller, 1850

Species of moth

Ceromitia crinigerella is a species of moth of the family Adelidae. It is known from Mozambique and South Africa.
