= Ceromitia mellicoma =

Scientific classification
- Kingdom: Animalia
- Phylum: Arthropoda
- Clade: Pancrustacea
- Class: Insecta
- Order: Lepidoptera
- Family: Adelidae
- Genus: Ceromitia
- Species: C. mellicoma

Binomial name
- Ceromitia mellicoma Meyrick, 1912

Species of moth

Ceromitia mellicoma is a species of moth of the family Adelidae. It is known from South Africa.
