= Ceromitia pucaraensis =

Scientific classification
- Kingdom: Animalia
- Phylum: Arthropoda
- Class: Insecta
- Order: Lepidoptera
- Family: Adelidae
- Genus: Ceromitia
- Species: C. pucaraensis

Binomial name
- Ceromitia pucaraensis Pastrana, 1961

Species of moth

Ceromitia pucaraensis is a moth of the Adelidae family or fairy longhorn moths. It was described by Pastrana in 1961. It is found in Argentina.
