= Ceromitia benedicta =

Scientific classification
- Kingdom: Animalia
- Phylum: Arthropoda
- Class: Insecta
- Order: Lepidoptera
- Family: Adelidae
- Genus: Ceromitia
- Species: C. benedicta

Binomial name
- Ceromitia benedicta Meyrick, 1918

Species of moth

Ceromitia benedicta is a species of moth of the family Adelidae. It was first described in 1918 by Edward Meyrick and is known from South Africa.

== Description ==
The species was described from a single male specimen caught in Pretoria in December. Edward Meyrick gave the specimen's appearance as follows:

Head yellow-ochreous. Palpi very short, loosely scaled, grey-whitish. Thorax pale ochreous. Forewings elongate, rather narrow, costa anteriorly slightly, posteriorly moderately arched, apex obtuse, termen very obliquely rounded; all veins separate; pale greyish-ochreous; costal edge dark grey towards base: cilia pale ochreous. Hindwings with 5 and 6 approximated at base; grey; cilia whitish-grey
