= Ceromitia aphroneura =

Scientific classification
- Kingdom: Animalia
- Phylum: Arthropoda
- Class: Insecta
- Order: Lepidoptera
- Family: Adelidae
- Genus: Ceromitia
- Species: C. aphroneura

Binomial name
- Ceromitia aphroneura Meyrick, 1930

Species of moth

Ceromitia aphroneura is a species of moth of the family Adelidae. It is known from Mozambique.
