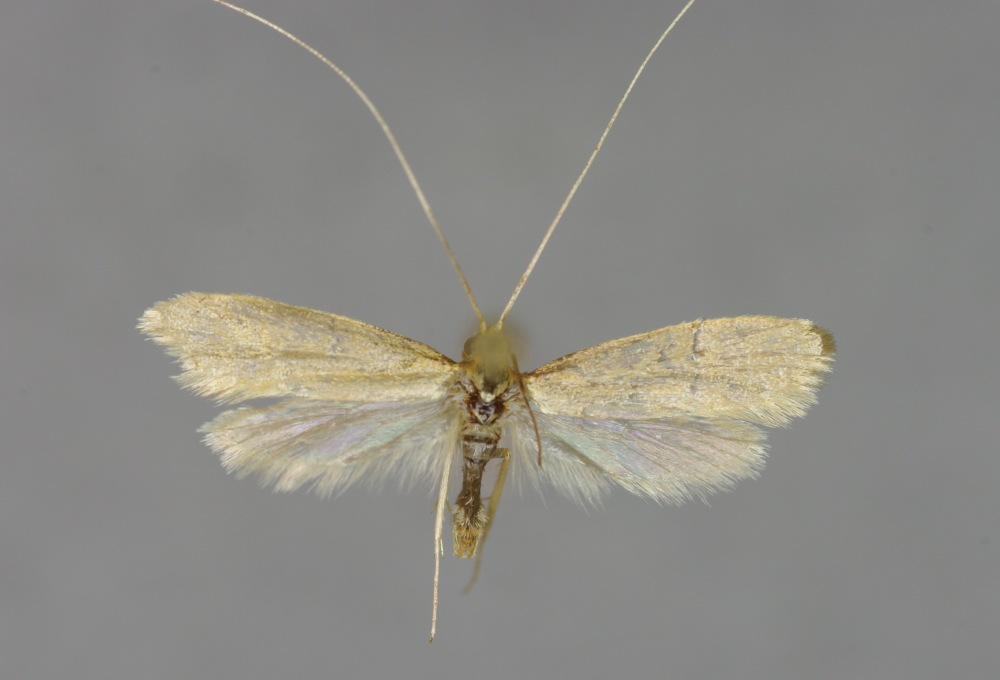
- Nematopogon sericinellus male Toscana (Tuscany)

Scientific classification
- Kingdom: Animalia
- Phylum: Arthropoda
- Clade: Pancrustacea
- Class: Insecta
- Order: Lepidoptera
- Family: Adelidae
- Genus: Nematopogon
- Species: N. sericinellus

Binomial name
- Nematopogon sericinellus Zeller, 1847

= Nematopogon sericinellus =

Species of moth

Nematopogon sericinellus is a moth of the Adelidae family. It is found in mainland Italy and on Sicily.
