= Ceromitia auricrinis =

Scientific classification
- Kingdom: Animalia
- Phylum: Arthropoda
- Class: Insecta
- Order: Lepidoptera
- Family: Adelidae
- Genus: Ceromitia
- Species: C. auricrinis

Binomial name
- Ceromitia auricrinis Walsingham, 1933

Species of moth

Ceromitia auricrinis is a moth of the family Adelidae or fairy longhorn moths. It is found in Uganda.
