= Nematopogon taiwanella =

Scientific classification
- Kingdom: Animalia
- Phylum: Arthropoda
- Class: Insecta
- Order: Lepidoptera
- Family: Adelidae
- Genus: Nematopogon
- Species: N. taiwanella

Binomial name
- Nematopogon taiwanella Kozlov, 2001
- Nematopogon taiwanella is known from Tayuling in Nantou, Taiwan

Species of moth

Nematopogon taiwanella is a moth of the Adelidae family or fairy longhorn moths. It was described by Mikhail Vasilievich Kozlov in 2001. It is found in Taiwan, where it was collected in the forest area above Tayuling (Nantou) at 2,900 m (9,500 ft) above sea level.
