= Nematopogon chalcophyllis =

Scientific classification
- Kingdom: Animalia
- Phylum: Arthropoda
- Class: Insecta
- Order: Lepidoptera
- Family: Adelidae
- Genus: Nematopogon
- Species: N. chalcophyllis

Binomial name
- Nematopogon chalcophyllis (Meyrick, 1935)

Synonyms
- Nemophora chalcophyllis Meyrick, 1935

Species of moth

Nematopogon chalcophyllis is a moth of the family Adelidae or fairy longhorn moths. It was described by Edward Meyrick in 1935. It is only found in Zhejiang, China.
