= Nematopogon distinctus =

Scientific classification
- Kingdom: Animalia
- Phylum: Arthropoda
- Clade: Pancrustacea
- Class: Insecta
- Order: Lepidoptera
- Family: Adelidae
- Genus: Nematopogon
- Species: N. distinctus

Binomial name
- Nematopogon distinctus Yasuda, 1957

Synonyms
- Nematopogon distincta Yasuda, 1957

Species of moth

Nematopogon distinctus is a moth of the Adelidae family or fairy longhorn moths. It was described by Yasuda in 1957. It is found in Japan.

The wingspan is 19–21 mm.
