= Ceromitia mioclina =

Scientific classification
- Kingdom: Animalia
- Phylum: Arthropoda
- Class: Insecta
- Order: Lepidoptera
- Family: Adelidae
- Genus: Ceromitia
- Species: C. mioclina

Binomial name
- Ceromitia mioclina Meyrick, 1921

Species of moth

Ceromitia mioclina is a species of moth of the family Adelidae. It is known from South Africa.
