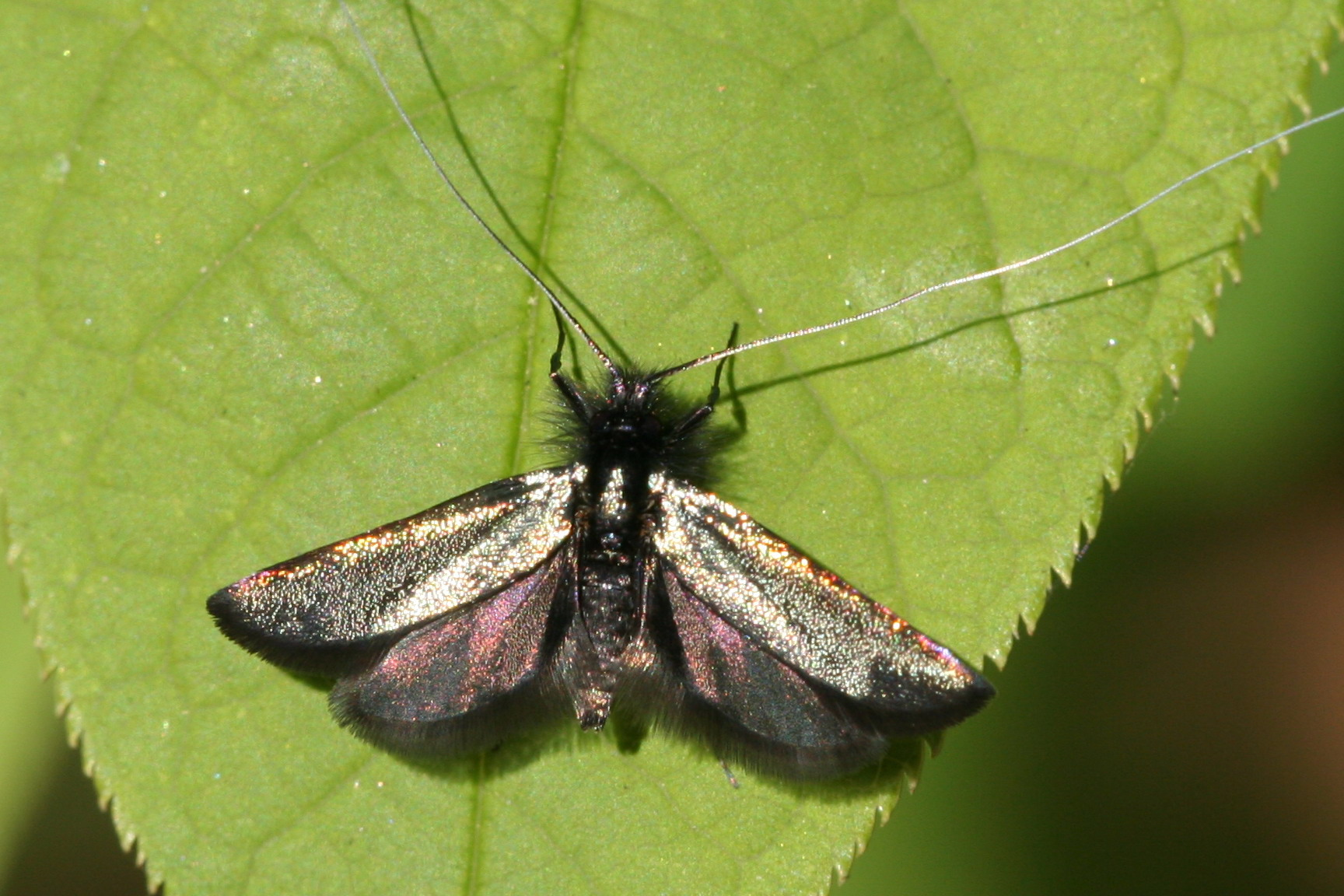
- Male
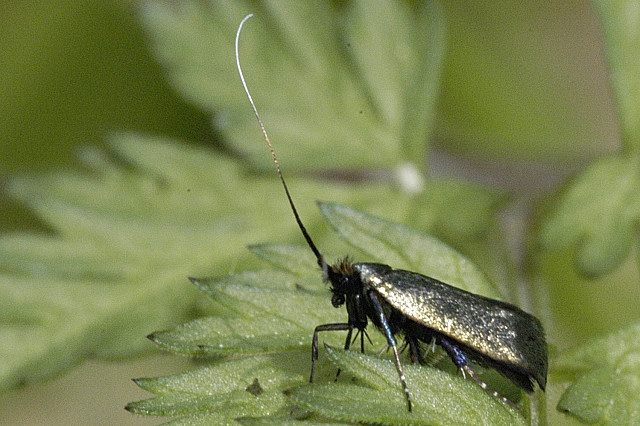
- Female

Scientific classification
- Kingdom: Animalia
- Phylum: Arthropoda
- Clade: Pancrustacea
- Class: Insecta
- Order: Lepidoptera
- Family: Adelidae
- Genus: Adela
- Species: A. reaumurella

Binomial name
- Adela reaumurella (Linnaeus, 1758)

Synonyms
- Phalaena reaumurella Linnaeus, 1758; Phalaena viridella Scopoli, 1763

= Green longhorn =

Species of moth

The green longhorn (Adela reaumurella) is a lepidopteran from the moth family Adelidae, the fairy longhorn moths.

== Distribution ==
Adela reaumurella has a palearctic distribution. It occurs in southern North Europe, Western Europe through Central Europe to Eastern Europe. Across the temperate Palearctic the range extends to Japan. In the South, the species occurs to Sicily and Anatolia. It is missing on the Iberian Peninsula.

== Habitat ==
These moths inhabit forests and open meadows.

== Description ==
The wingspan of Adela reaumurella ranges from 14 to 18 millimeter. Wings have an ovoid-elongated shape with rounded apex. The upper wings of both sexes are bronzy or metallic greenish, close along the body. The hind wings are dark brown with a bronze-violet shine. The males have very long thread-shaped whitish antennas, forward-facing and reaching about four times the length of the body. They have very developed eyes and rough black hair on their heads and thorax. The females have relatively short antennas with shorter and lighter hair on their heads. They have also a few orange hairs between the eyes.

== Biology ==
The flight time of these day-active moths ranges from April to June. The males are often seen in the spring sunshine demonstrating 'lekking' behaviour, where they form swarms of up to 50 individuals.Each male displays in the swarm by flying up to the top of the group and then parachuting down with still wings: the antennae are also held out horizontally to increase air resistance. If a female flies through the swarm, it is caught by a male and the mating in flight takes place. The caterpillars live among fallen leaves from birch and oak and feed on leaves remains, often Quercus species, forming mines on them. They protect themselves for the summer and winter in an oblong, brown bag-like structure of small pieces of fallen leaves. In this bag also the pupation takes place the following spring.

== Etymology ==
The name honours the French naturalist René Antoine Ferchault de Réaumur.

== Gallery ==
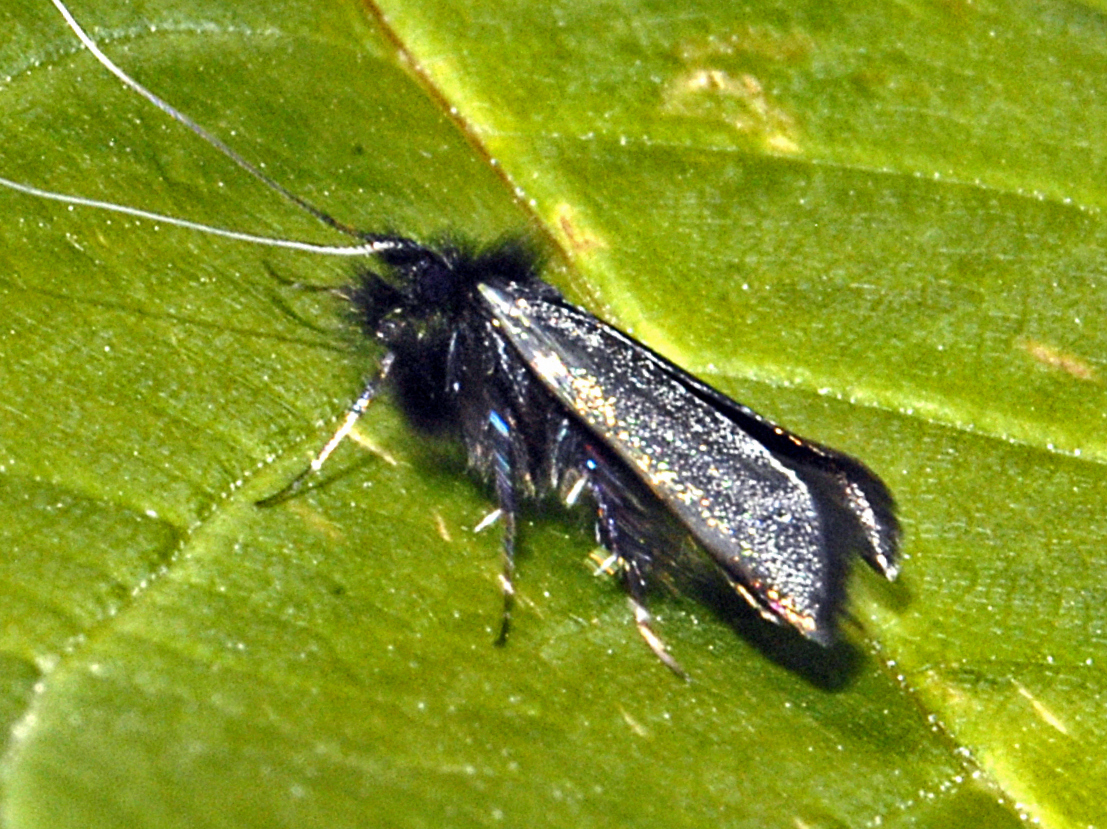
Adela reaumurella

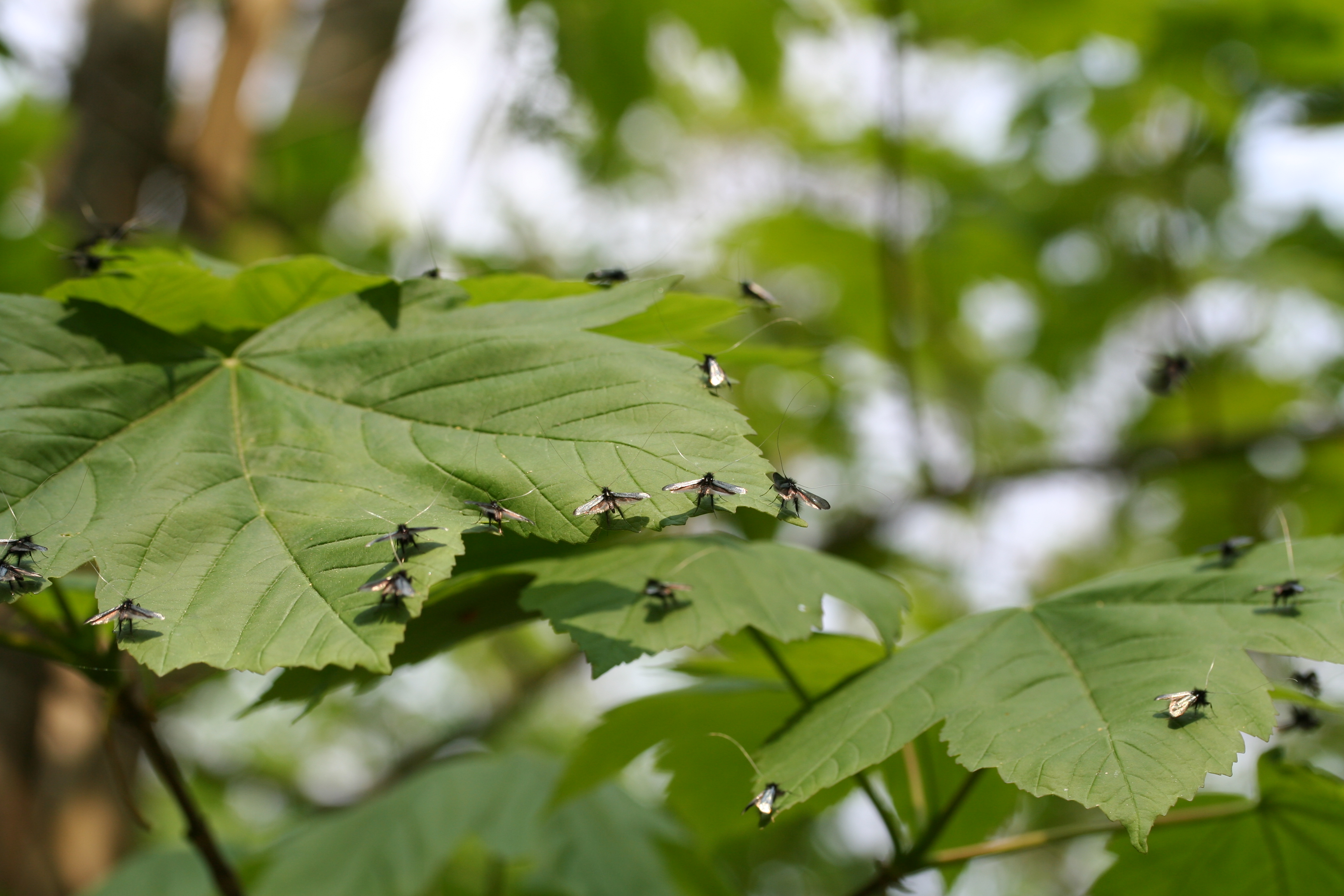
Adults resting

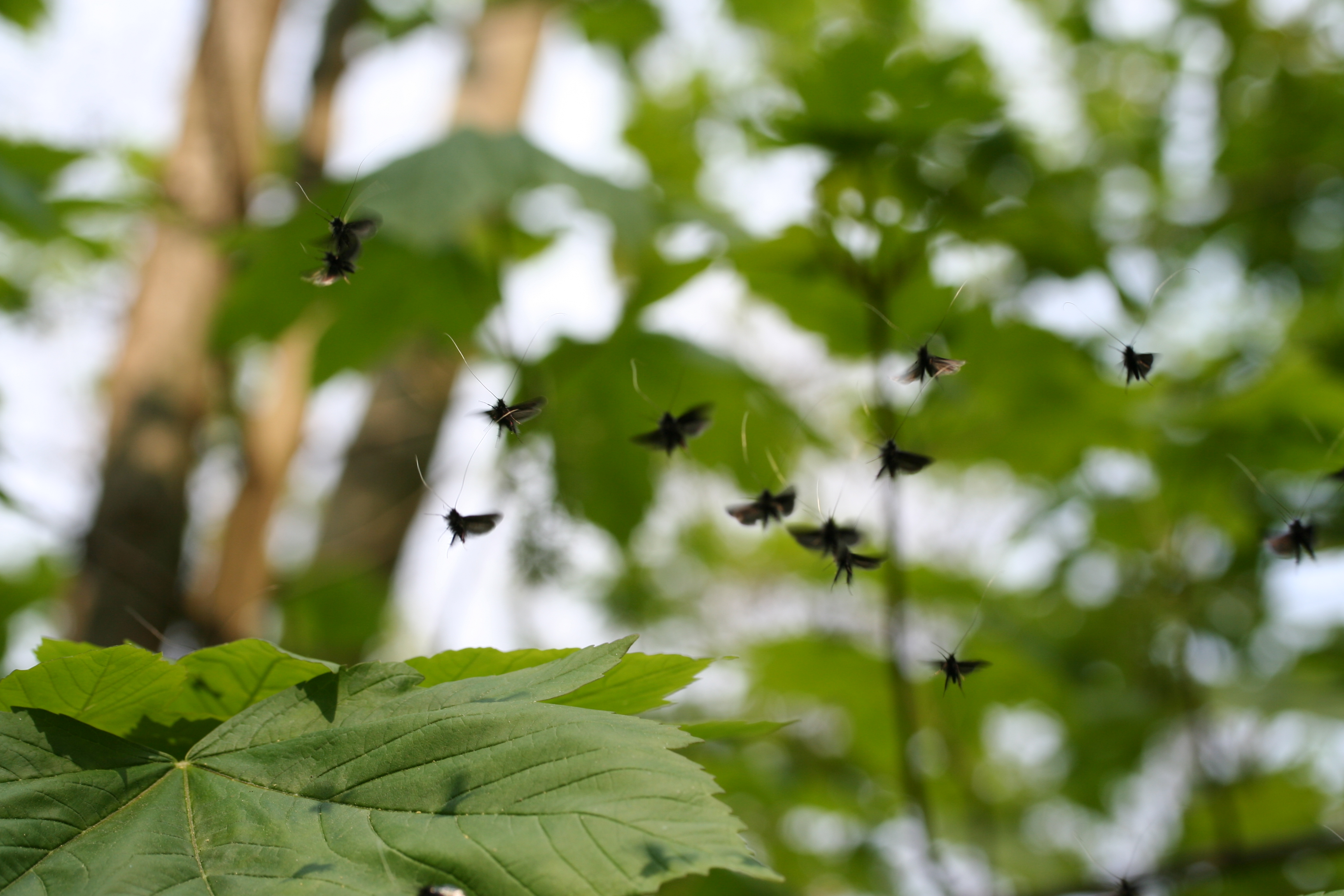
Adults swarming

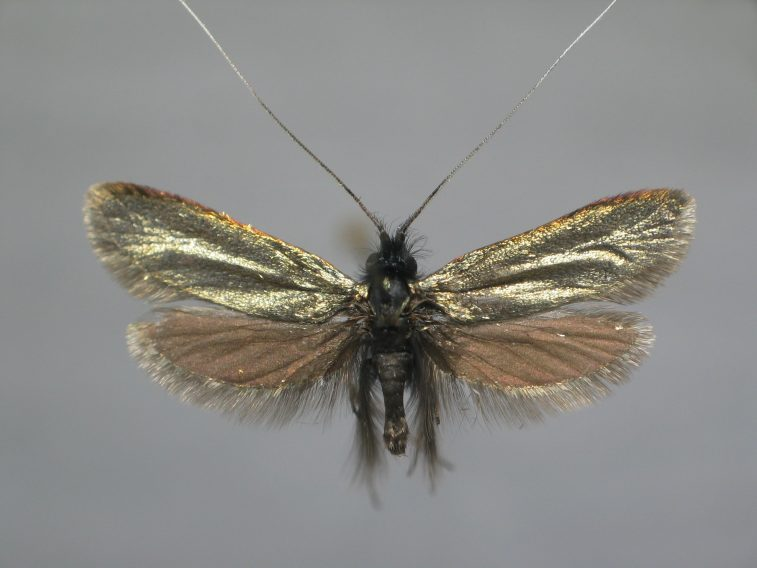
Mounted specimen
