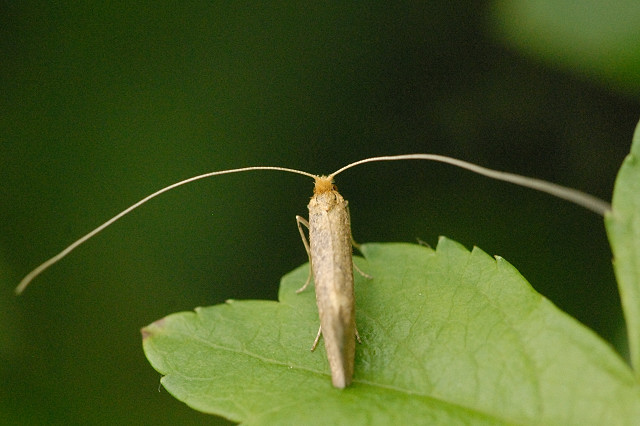
- Adult Nematopogon metaxella at Commanster (Belgian Ardennes)

Scientific classification
- Kingdom: Animalia
- Phylum: Arthropoda
- Clade: Pancrustacea
- Class: Insecta
- Order: Lepidoptera
- Family: Adelidae
- Subfamily: Nematopogoninae
- Genus: Nematopogon; Zeller, 1839

Type species
- Nematopogon schwarziellus Zeller, 1839

Species
- Several, see text

= Nematopogon =

Moth genus in family Adelidae

"Nematopogon" was also invalidly established by Agassiz in 1847 as an unjustified emendation for the fungus moth genus Nemapogon.

Nematopogon is a genus of the fairy longhorn moth family (Adelidae). Among these, it belongs to subfamily Nematopogoninae, of which it is the type genus.

== Selected species ==
Species of Nematopogon include:

- Nematopogon adansoniella (Villers, 1789)
- Nematopogon chalcophyllis (Meyrick, 1935)
- Nematopogon distinctus (Yasuda, 1957)
- Nematopogon dorsigutellus (Erschoff, 1877)
- Nematopogon magna (Zeller, 1878) (= N. magnus, N. variella, N. variellus)
- Nematopogon metaxella (Hübner, 1813) (= N. metaxellus)
- Nematopogon pilella (Denis & Schiffermüller, 1775) (= N. pilellus)
- Nematopogon robertella (Clerck, 1759)
- Nematopogon schwarziellus Zeller, 1839 (= N. schwarziella)
- Nematopogon sericinellus Zeller, 1847
- Nematopogon swammerdamella (Linnaeus, 1758)
- Nematopogon taiwanella Kozlov, 2001
