= Nemophora brachypetala =

Scientific classification
- Kingdom: Animalia
- Phylum: Arthropoda
- Class: Insecta
- Order: Lepidoptera
- Family: Adelidae
- Genus: Nemophora
- Species: N. brachypetala

Binomial name
- Nemophora brachypetala (Meyrick, 1912)

Synonyms
- Nemotois brachypetala Meyrick, 1912

Species of moth

Nemophora brachypetala is a moth of the Adelidae family. It is found in the Northern Territory and Queensland.
