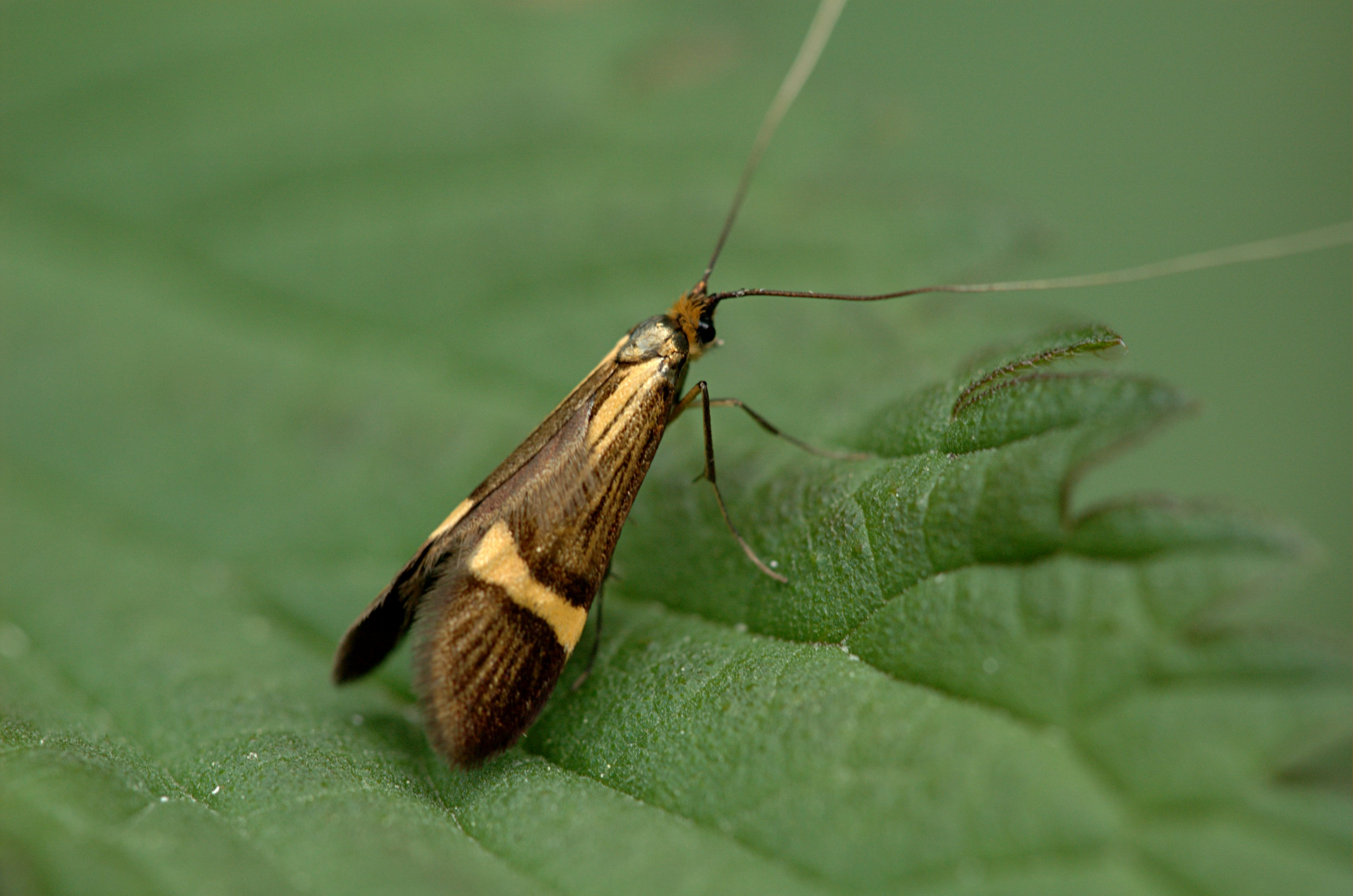
- A longhorn moth, Nemophora degeerella

Scientific classification
- Kingdom: Animalia
- Phylum: Arthropoda
- Clade: Pancrustacea
- Class: Insecta
- Order: Lepidoptera
- Clade: Incurvariina
- Superfamily: Adeloidea; Bruand, 1850

Families
- Adelidae; Cecidosidae; Heliozelidae; Incurvariidae; Prodoxidae

Diversity
- About 600 species

Synonyms
- Incurvarioidea Spuler, 1898

= Adeloidea =

Superfamily of moths

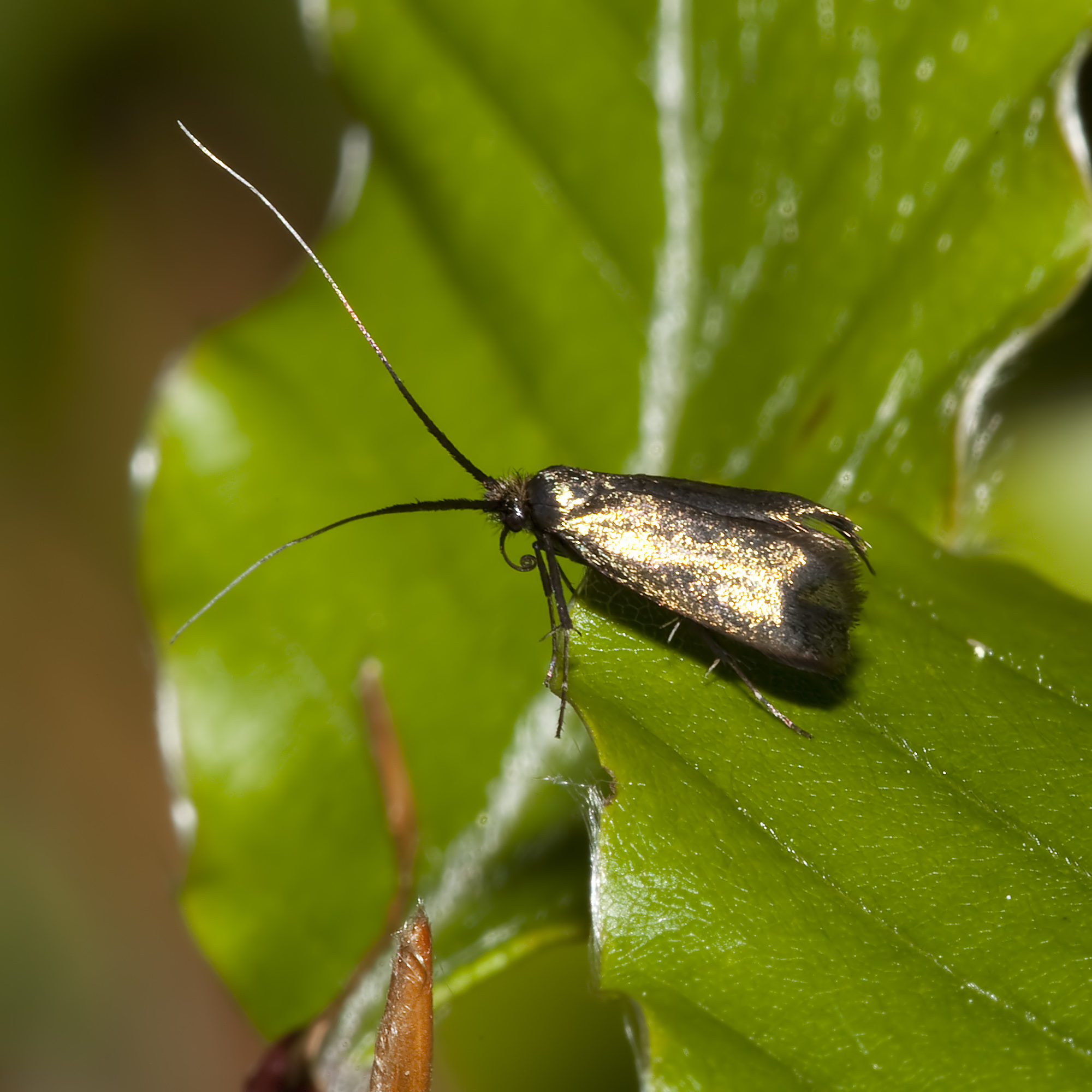
Adela reaumurella

Adeloidea is a superfamily of primitive monotrysian moths in the order Lepidoptera which consists of leafcutters, yucca moths and relatives. This superfamily is characterised by a piercing, extensible ovipositor used for laying eggs in plants. Many species are day-flying with metallic patterns.

== Sources ==
- Firefly Encyclopedia of Insects and Spiders, edited by Christopher O'Toole, ISBN 1-55297-612-2, 2002
