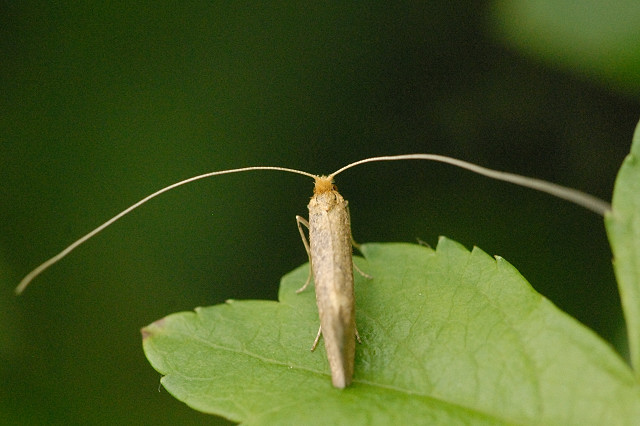

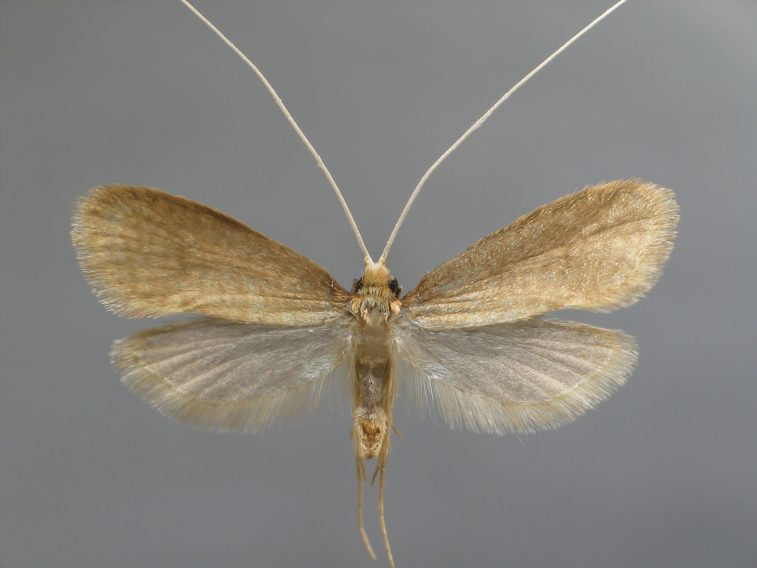

Scientific classification
- Kingdom: Animalia
- Phylum: Arthropoda
- Clade: Pancrustacea
- Class: Insecta
- Order: Lepidoptera
- Family: Adelidae
- Genus: Nematopogon
- Species: N. metaxella

Binomial name
- Nematopogon metaxella (Hübner, 1813)

Synonyms
- Tinea metaxella Hübner, 1813; Nematopogon metaxellus

= Nematopogon metaxella =

Species of moth

Nematopogon metaxella is a moth of the Adelidae family. It is found in most of Europe.

The wingspan is 15–17 mm. The head is ochreous-orange, the face whitish. The forewings shorter and broader, shining ochreous, indistinctly brownish strigulated with a brownish discal mark beyond middle. The hindwings are fuscous; cilia light grey, suffused basally with ochreous. To certainly determine the species of the genus Nematopogon dissection and study of the genitalia is necessary.

Adults are on wing from June to July.They fly in the afternoon and at dusk. The habitat is alluvial forest and high moorland forest.

The larvae feed in a case among detritus and leaf-litter on the ground.
