= Nemophora sparsella =

Scientific classification
- Kingdom: Animalia
- Phylum: Arthropoda
- Class: Insecta
- Order: Lepidoptera
- Family: Adelidae
- Genus: Nemophora
- Species: N. sparsella

Binomial name
- Nemophora sparsella Walker, 1863

Synonyms
- Nemotois sparsella Walker, 1863; Adela chrysolamprella Rosenstock, 1885

Species of moth

Nemophora sparsella is a moth of the family Adelidae. It is found from southern Queensland to Victoria and Tasmania.
