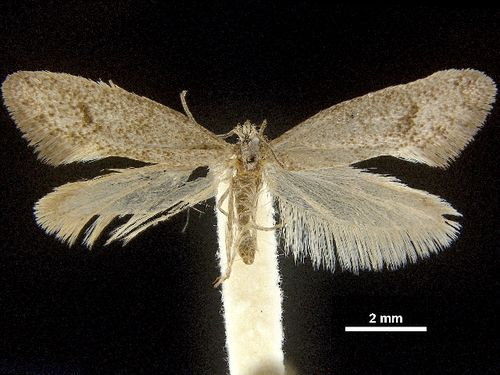

Scientific classification
- Kingdom: Animalia
- Phylum: Arthropoda
- Clade: Pancrustacea
- Class: Insecta
- Order: Lepidoptera
- Superfamily: Adeloidea
- Family: Tridentaformidae; Regier et al., 2015
- Genus: Tridentaforma; Davis, 1978
- Species: T. fuscoleuca

Binomial name
- Tridentaforma fuscoleuca (Braun, 1923)

Synonyms
- Lampronia fuscoleuca Braun, 1923

= Tridentaforma =

Genus of moths

Tridentaforma is a genus of moths of the Tridentaformidae family, the sole genus of the family. There is only one species in the genus (and the family), Tridentaforma fuscoleuca, which is found in California and Canada.

The wingspan is 8.5-20.5 mm.

Tridentaforma has been considered a member of the family Incurvariidae and Prodoxidae in the past. In 2015, Regier, et al. described a new family, Tridentaformidae, containing the "problematic genus" Tridentaforma.
