= Nemophora selasphora =

Scientific classification
- Kingdom: Animalia
- Phylum: Arthropoda
- Class: Insecta
- Order: Lepidoptera
- Family: Adelidae
- Genus: Nemophora
- Species: N. selasphora

Binomial name
- Nemophora selasphora (Turner, 1913)

Synonyms
- Nomotois selasphora Turner, 1913

Species of moth

Nemophora selasphora is a moth of the Adelidae family. It is found in Queensland.

== Original description ==
Male 12-13 mm. Head fuscous; frons brilliant bluish-metallic. Palpi moderately long; fuscous. Antennae fuscous; basal joint iridescent. Thorax bronzy-metallic. Abdomen dark fuscous. Legs fuscous, with metallic reflections; tarsi with whitish annulations. Forewings brilliant purple or golden according to incidence of light; a blackish subcostal streak from base to 1/4; a pear-shaped transverse yellowish fascia with longitudinal striations, from costa beyond middle, broadening in costal portion of disc, then tapering to a point on dorsum before tornus; cilia gleaming with purple and gold. Hindwings thinly scaled; fuscous, with purple iridescence; cilia fuscous. Type in Coll. Turner. Q. : Mount Tambourine, in November; five specimens.

— Original description by Turner
