= Trichofrons =

Scientific classification
- Kingdom: Animalia
- Phylum: Arthropoda
- Class: Insecta
- Order: Lepidoptera
- Family: Adelidae
- Genus: Trichofrons; Amsel, 1937
- Species: T. pantherella

Binomial name
- Trichofrons pantherella (Guenée, 1849)

Synonyms
- Adela pantherella Guenée, 1849

Moth genus in family Adelidae

Trichofrons is a monotypic moth genus of the family Adelidae, the fairy longhorn moths. The genus was erected by Amsel in 1937. Its sole species is Trichofrons pantherella, which was first described by Achille Guenée in 1849. It is found in Algeria.
