= Nemophora polydaedala =

Scientific classification
- Kingdom: Animalia
- Phylum: Arthropoda
- Class: Insecta
- Order: Lepidoptera
- Family: Adelidae
- Genus: Nemophora
- Species: N. polydaedala

Binomial name
- Nemophora polydaedala (Turner, 1913)

Synonyms
- Nemotois polydaedala Turner, 1913

Species of moth

Nemophora polydaedala is a moth of the Adelidae family. It is found in Queensland.

== Original description ==
Male 13 mm. Head and palpi ochreous; frons brilliant bluish-metallic. Antennae fuscous, paler towards apex; basal joint iridescent. Thorax bronzy-metallic. [Abdomen broken] Legs fuscous, with metallic reflections; tarsi with whitish annulations. Forewings shining coppery-purple; a large triangular golden-yellow basal patch, containing a costal and a subdorsal short bluish-metallic longitudinal streaks, and between these two raised bronzy-metallic knobs; a fine blackish line edging basal patch; a golden-yellow transverse bar from 3/5 costa, reaching mid-disc, edged posteriorly by a blackish bar, and anteriorly by a narrow blackish suffusion, which extends to 3/4 dorsum, forming an incomplete fascia; cilia coppery-purple. Hindwings thinly scaled; fuscous, with slight purple reflections, cilia fuscous Type in Coll. Turner. Q. : Kuranda, near Cairns, in November; one specimen, received from Mr. F. P. Dodd.

— Original description by Turner
