= Nemophora opalina =

Scientific classification
- Kingdom: Animalia
- Phylum: Arthropoda
- Class: Insecta
- Order: Lepidoptera
- Family: Adelidae
- Genus: Nemophora
- Species: N. opalina

Binomial name
- Nemophora opalina (Meyrick, 1912)

Synonyms
- Nemotois opalina Meyrick, 1912

Species of moth

Nemophora opalina is a moth of the family Adelidae first described by Edward Meyrick in 1912. It is found in the Australian states of New South Wales and Queensland.

== Original description ==
Male, Female 11 millimetres (0.43 in). Head and palpi ochreous; frons brilliantly bluish-metallic. Antennae fuscous. Thorax bronzy-metallic. Abdomen dark fuscous. Legs fuscous, with metallic reflections; tarsi with whitish annulations. Forewings bright golden, in some lights purple; a short broad longitudinal yellow streak from base of dorsum; between it and dorsum a blackish streak; between it and costa first a bluish-metallic streak, then a blackish streak; a bluish-metallic streak on base of costa; a broad transverse yellow band with longitudinal blackish striations, extending on costa from 2/7 to 4/7, and on dorsum from 1/4 to 3/4; cilia fuscous, with golden reflections. Hindwings thinly scaled; fuscous, with slight purplish iridescence; cilia fuscous, towards tornus whitish. N.Q.: Kuranda, near Cairns, in April (Dodd).-Q.: Montville, near Nambour, in October; four specimens.

— Original description by Edward Meyrick
