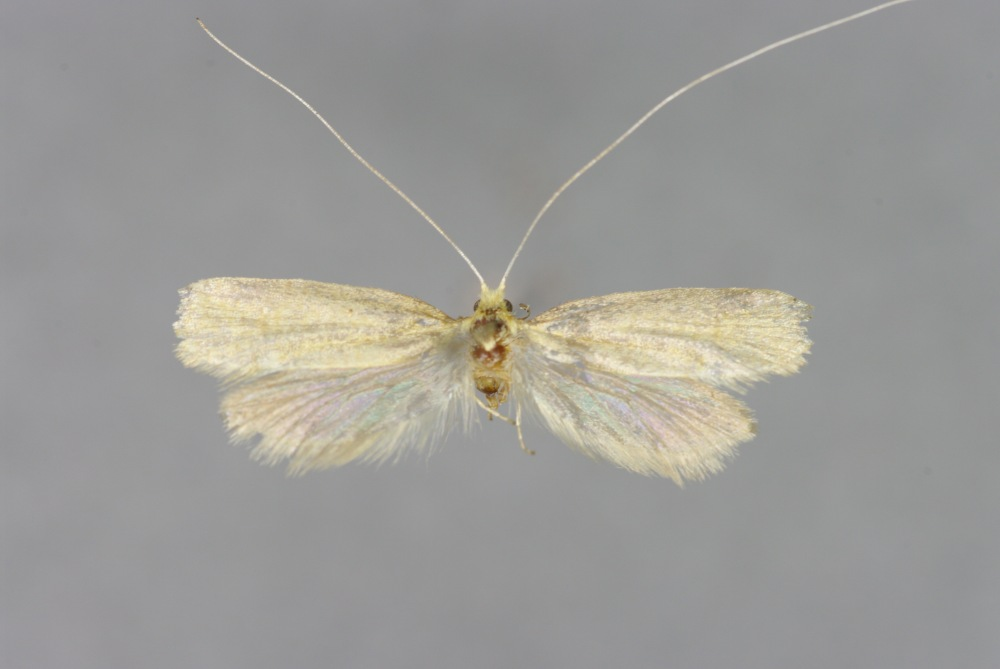
- Nematopogon pilella Salzburg, Austria

Scientific classification
- Kingdom: Animalia
- Phylum: Arthropoda
- Clade: Pancrustacea
- Class: Insecta
- Order: Lepidoptera
- Family: Adelidae
- Genus: Nematopogon
- Species: N. pilella

Binomial name
- Nematopogon pilella (Denis & Schiffermüller, 1775)

Synonyms
- Tinea pilella Denis & Schiffermüller, 1775; Nematopogon pilellus

= Nematopogon pilella =

Species of moth

Nematopogon pilella is a moth of the Adelidae family. It is found in almost all of Europe, except Portugal, Spain and Slovenia.

== Description ==
The wingspan is 13–16 mm. A medium-sized, brownish or brownish-yellow moth with long antennae. The antennae are filamentous and white, in the male two and a half to three times as long as the forewing, in the female almost twice as long as the forewing. The head is covered with yellowish, erect, hair-like scales. In the male, the forebody and forewing are rather dark brown, rather dull, often with a more or less clear, light net pattern in the outer part. In the female, these are usually much lighter, brownish-yellow with a certain bronze-like sheen. The hind wing is grey without any conspicuous sheen, thinly scaled. Meyrick-Head is orange, face whitish. Forewings less elongate, shining greyish-ochreous or light fuscous, faintly darker-strigulated. Hindwings grey; cilia grey. To certainly determine the species of the genus Nematopogon dissection and study of the genitalia is necessary.

The larvae possibly feed on the dead leaves of Vaccinium species. They live within a movable case.
