= Nemophora panaeola =

Scientific classification
- Kingdom: Animalia
- Phylum: Arthropoda
- Class: Insecta
- Order: Lepidoptera
- Family: Adelidae
- Genus: Nemophora
- Species: N. panaeola

Binomial name
- Nemophora panaeola (Turner, 1913)

Synonyms
- Nemotois panaeola Turner, 1913

Species of moth

Nemophora panaeola is a moth of the Adelidae family. It is found in Queensland.

== Original Description ==
Male 12-13 mm. Head shining fuscous-purple; frons brilliantly metallic bluish or greenish. Palpi fuscous. Antennae fuscous, towards apex paler; basal joint coppery-purple. Thorax coppery-purple. Abdomen dark fuscous. Legs fuscous, with metallic reflections; tarsi with whitish annulations. Forewings brilliant purple intermixed with fiery gold and deep blue scales; a broad triangular sub-basal dorsal yellow blotch reaching 2/3 across wing; opposite its apex is a small yellow costal spot at 1/5; a narrow median yellow transverse fascia with longitudinal fuscous striations; cilia fuscous-purple. Hindwings thinly scaled; fuscous; cilia fuscous. Type in Coll. Turner. N.Q. : Kuranda, near Cairns, in December. -Q.: Killarney, in October. Two specimens.

— Original description by Turner
