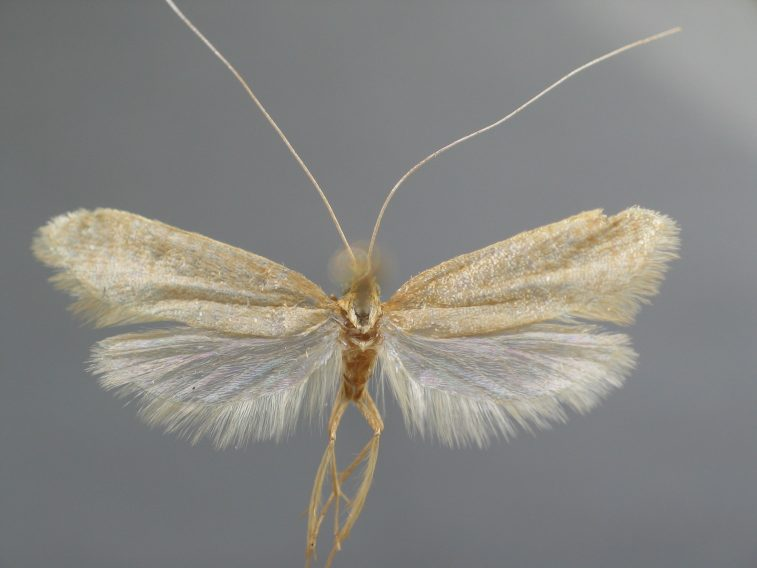

Scientific classification
- Kingdom: Animalia
- Phylum: Arthropoda
- Clade: Pancrustacea
- Class: Insecta
- Order: Lepidoptera
- Family: Adelidae
- Genus: Nematopogon
- Species: N. schwarziellus

Binomial name
- Nematopogon schwarziellus Zeller, 1839

= Nematopogon schwarziellus =

Species of moth

Nematopogon schwarziellus is a moth of the Adelidae family. It is found in almost all of Europe, except Portugal, Slovenia, Croatia, Greece and Ukraine.

The wingspan is 14–17 mm. Head orange. Forewings long, light shining greyish-ochreous, indistinctly strigulated with grey; a grey discal mark beyond middle. Hindwings light grey; cilia whitish-grey. To certainly determine the species of the genus Nematopogon dissection and study of the genitalia is necessary.

Adults are on wing from April to August.

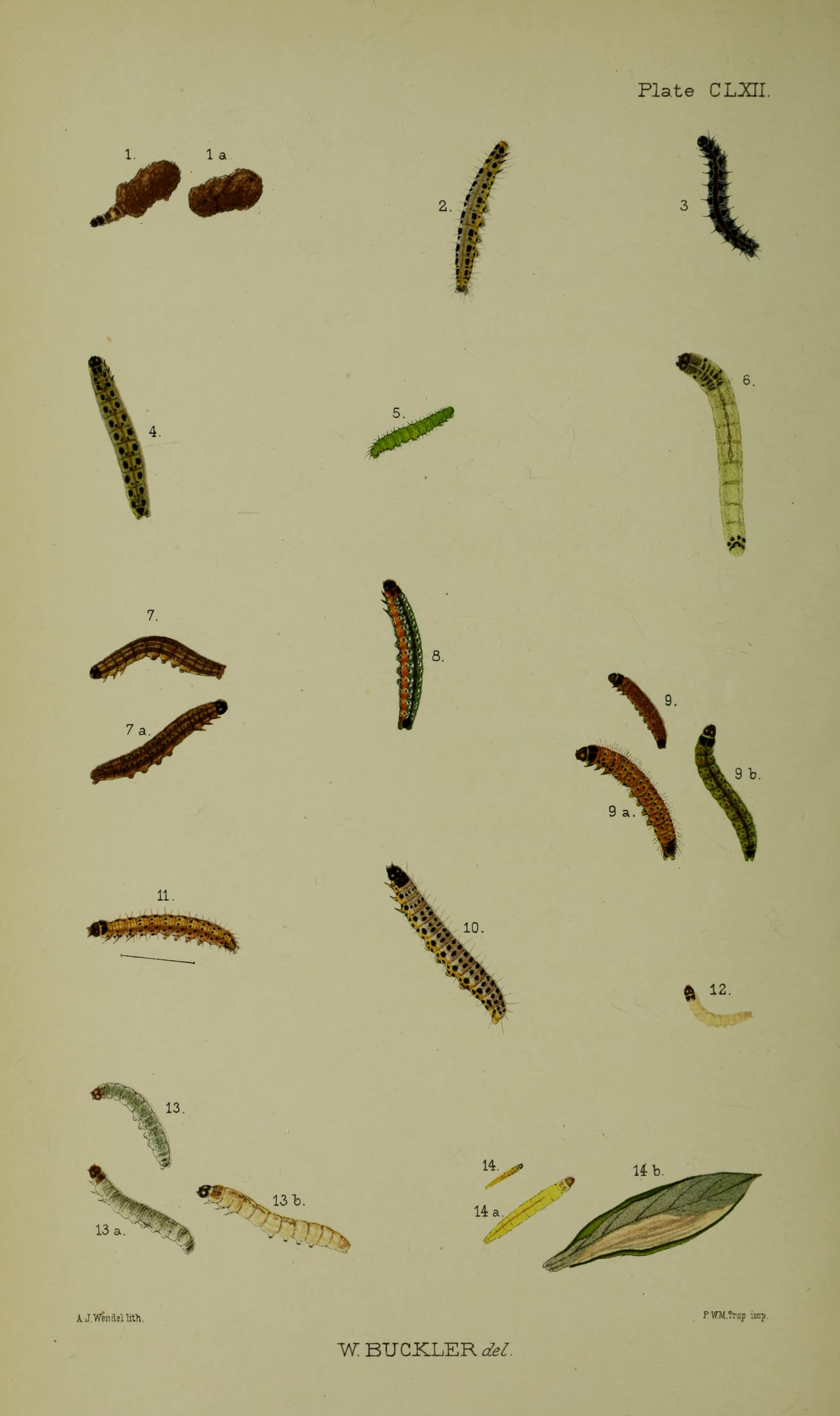
Fig.1 larva in case, 1a case

Females have been observed laying eggs on various herbaceous plants, including Ajuga, Alliaria petiolata, Glechoma hederacea and Urtica species.
