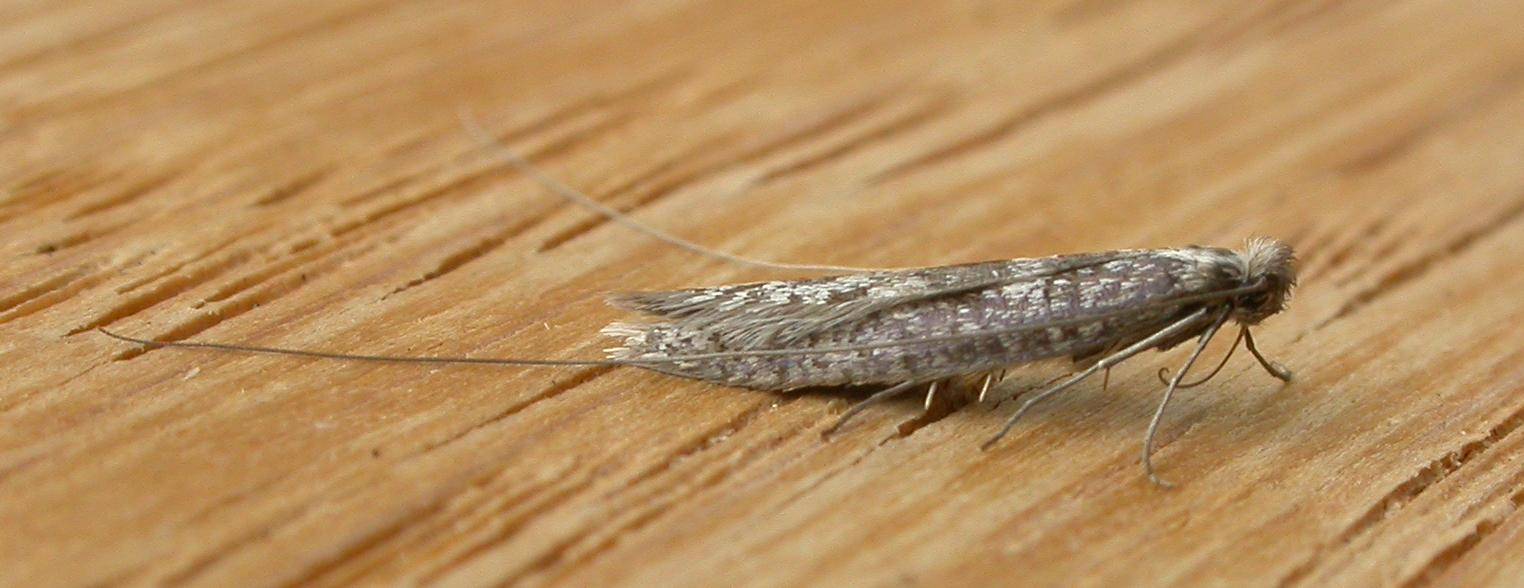
- Ceromitia iolampra

Scientific classification
- Kingdom: Animalia
- Phylum: Arthropoda
- Class: Insecta
- Order: Lepidoptera
- Family: Adelidae
- Subfamily: Nematopogoninae
- Genus: Ceromitia; Zeller, 1852

Synonyms
- Agisana Möschler, 1884; Exorectis Meyrick, 1906; Ulometra Meyrick, 1912; Trichorrhabda Meyrick, 1912; Haplotypa Janse, 1945

= Ceromitia =

Moth genus in family Adelidae

Ceromitia is a genus of moths in the Adelidae family.

It consists of primitive moths mainly found in Africa and South America as well as from Australia

== Species ==
- Ceromitia albosparsa
- Ceromitia alternipunctella
- Ceromitia amphichroa
- Ceromitia aphroneura
- Ceromitia arata
- Ceromitia atelopis
- Ceromitia auricrinis
- Ceromitia autoscia
- Ceromitia benedicta
- Ceromitia bipartita
- Ceromitia bipectinifera
- Ceromitia brevilobata
- Ceromitia centrologa
- Ceromitia cerochlora
- Ceromitia chalcocapna
- Ceromitia chionocrossa
- Ceromitia chrysomitra
- Ceromitia crinigerella
- Ceromitia cuneella
- Ceromitia decepta
- Ceromitia delta
- Ceromitia descripta
- Ceromitia devia
- Ceromitia dicksoni
- Ceromitia durbanica
- Ceromitia eccentra
- Ceromitia elongatella
- Ceromitia eremarcha
- Ceromitia exalbata
- Ceromitia fuscipunctella
- Ceromitia geminata
- Ceromitia gigantea
- Ceromitia glandularis
- Ceromitia graptosema
- Ceromitia grisata
- Ceromitia heteroloba
- Ceromitia holosticta
- Ceromitia ilyodes
- Ceromitia impura
- Ceromitia indigna
- Ceromitia ingeminans
- Ceromitia intermedia
- Ceromitia iolampra
- Ceromitia iolitha
- Ceromitia laninensis
- Ceromitia laureata
- Ceromitia leptosticta
- Ceromitia libropis
- Ceromitia lizeri
- Ceromitia macrograpta
- Ceromitia melanodesma
- Ceromitia melanostrota
- Ceromitia mellicoma
- Ceromitia mioclina
- Ceromitia mitrata
- Ceromitia monopectinifera
- Ceromitia multipunctata
- Ceromitia nerina
- Ceromitia ochrodyta
- Ceromitia ochrotricha
- Ceromitia palyntis
- Ceromitia phaeoceros
- Ceromitia phaeocoma
- Ceromitia phaeocomoides
- Ceromitia phyrsima
- Ceromitia pilularis
- Ceromitia praetexta
- Ceromitia pucaraensis
- Ceromitia punctulata
- Ceromitia resonans
- Ceromitia schajovskoii
- Ceromitia sciographa
- Ceromitia simpliciella
- Ceromitia spatolodes
- Ceromitia spilodesma
- Ceromitia sporaea
- Ceromitia stathmodes
- Ceromitia synchroma
- Ceromitia synneura
- Ceromitia systelitis
- Ceromitia transtrifera
- Ceromitia trigoniferella
- Ceromitia trilobata
- Ceromitia tubulifolia Parra & Ogden, 2011 (from Chile)
- Ceromitia turpisella
- Ceromitia tyrochlora
- Ceromitia unguiphora
- Ceromitia vansoni
- Ceromitia viscida
- Ceromitia wahlbergi
- Ceromitia xanthocoma
