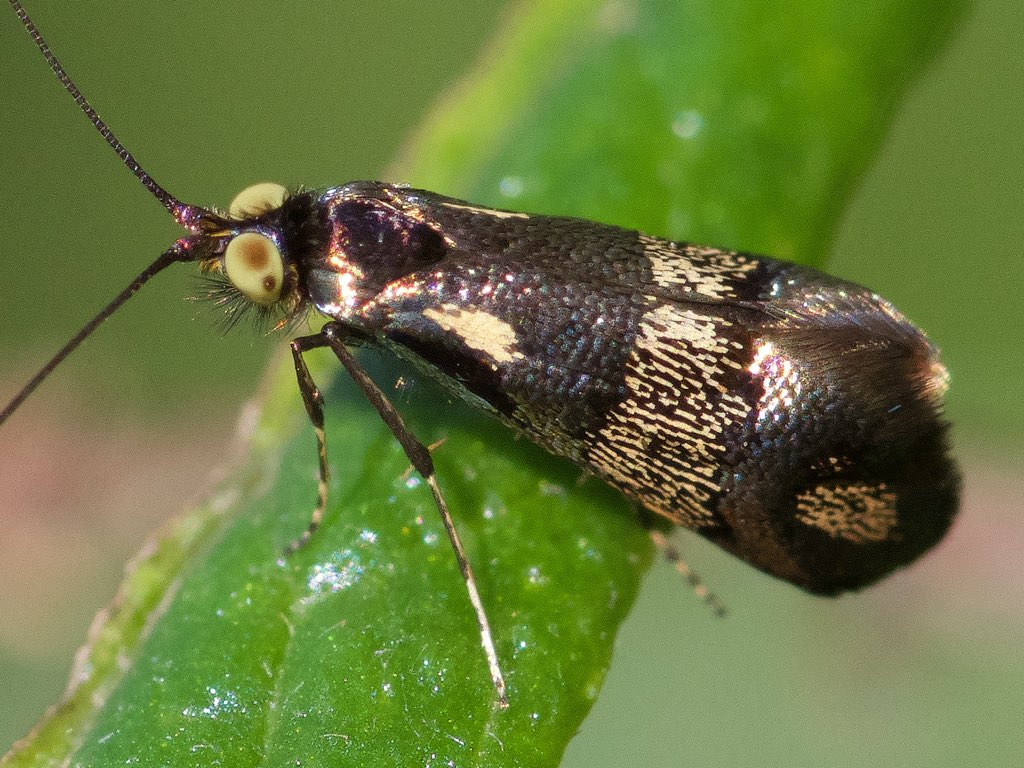

Scientific classification
- Kingdom: Animalia
- Phylum: Arthropoda
- Class: Insecta
- Order: Lepidoptera
- Family: Adelidae
- Genus: Nemophora
- Species: N. topazias

Binomial name
- Nemophora topazias (Meyrick, 1893)

Synonyms
- Nemotois topazias Meyrick, 1893

= Nemophora topazias =

Species of moth

Nemophora topazias is a species of moth in the family Adelidae. It is found in Australia (Australian Capital Territory, New South Wales, Queensland, South Australia and Tasmania).

The larvae feed on the flowers of Acacia baileyana.
