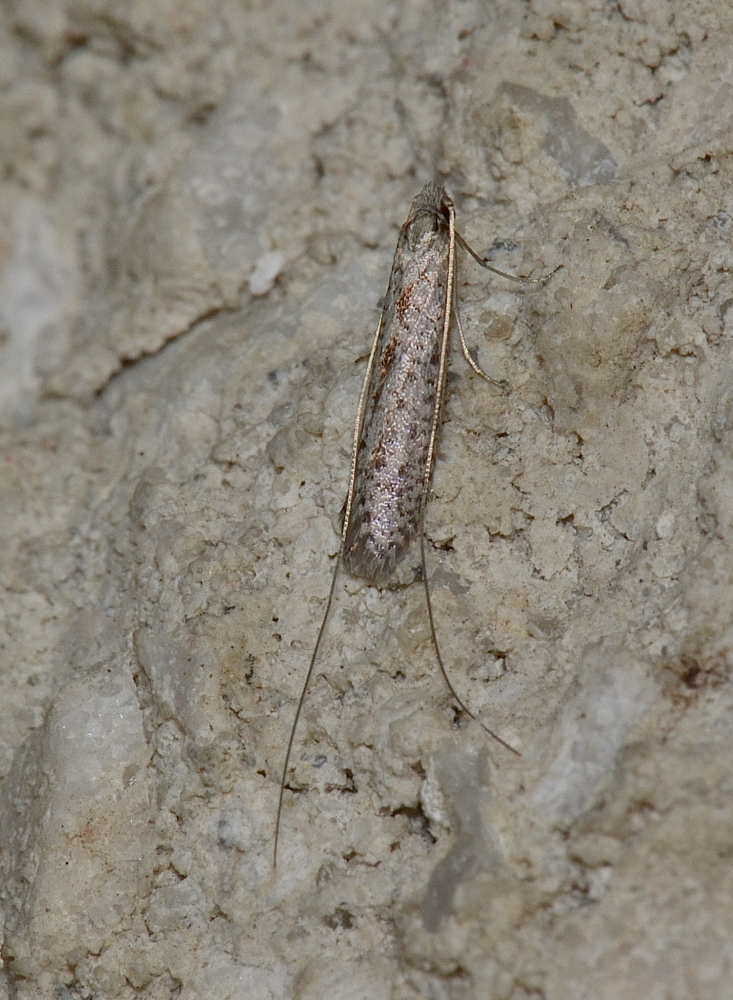

Scientific classification
- Kingdom: Animalia
- Phylum: Arthropoda
- Clade: Pancrustacea
- Class: Insecta
- Order: Lepidoptera
- Family: Adelidae
- Genus: Ceromitia
- Species: C. leptosticta

Binomial name
- Ceromitia leptosticta (Turner, 1900)

Synonyms
- Nemophora leptosticta Turner, 1900

= Ceromitia leptosticta =

Species of moth

Ceromitia leptosticta is a moth of the family Adelidae. It is found in Australia within both the Australian Capital Territory and Queensland.
