= Nemophora laurella =

Scientific classification
- Kingdom: Animalia
- Phylum: Arthropoda
- Class: Insecta
- Order: Lepidoptera
- Family: Adelidae
- Genus: Nemophora
- Species: N. laurella

Binomial name
- Nemophora laurella (Newman, 1856)

Synonyms
- Adela laurella Newman, 1856; Nemotois orichalcias Meyrick, 1893

Species of moth

Nemophora laurella is a moth of the Adelidae family. It is found in Victoria.

Meyrick stated that it frequented the flowers of Bursaria spinosa.
