= Ceromitia autoscia =

Scientific classification
- Kingdom: Animalia
- Phylum: Arthropoda
- Clade: Pancrustacea
- Class: Insecta
- Order: Lepidoptera
- Family: Adelidae
- Genus: Ceromitia
- Species: C. autoscia

Binomial name
- Ceromitia autoscia (Meyrick, 1906)

Synonyms
- Exorectis autoscia Meyrick, 1906

Species of moth

Ceromitia autoscia is a moth of the family Adelidae. It is found in Victoria.
