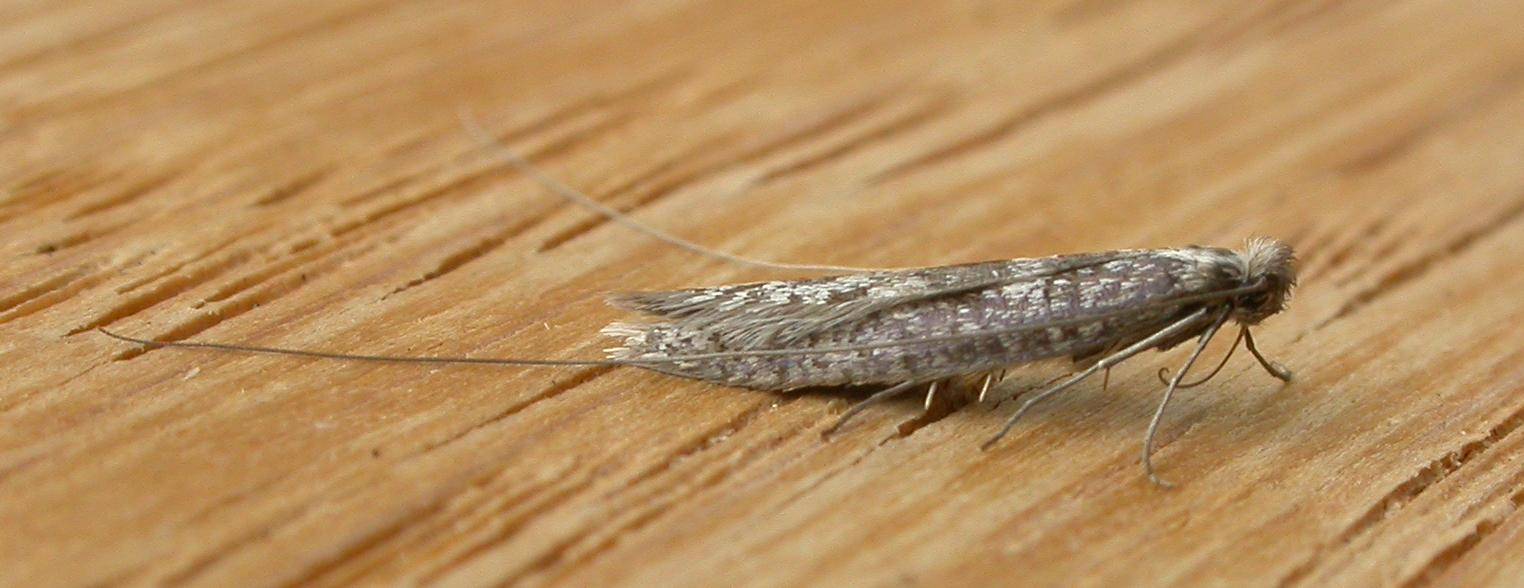

Scientific classification
- Kingdom: Animalia
- Phylum: Arthropoda
- Clade: Pancrustacea
- Class: Insecta
- Order: Lepidoptera
- Family: Adelidae
- Genus: Ceromitia
- Species: C. iolampra

Binomial name
- Ceromitia iolampra (Turner, 1900)

Synonyms
- Nemophora iolampra Turner, 1900

= Ceromitia iolampra =

Species of moth

Ceromitia iolampra is a moth of the family Adelidae. It is found in the Australian Capital Territory, New South Wales and Victoria.

The larvae feed on the flowers of Acacia baileyana and Acacia genistifolia. Later instar larvae live on the ground in a portable case made from flower parts or detritus.
