= Charles Théophile Bruand d'Uzelle =

French entomologist (1808–1861)

Charles Théophile Bruand d'Uzelle (5 March 1808, Besançon – 3 August 1861, Besançon) was a French entomologist who specialised in microlepidoptera. He described several new species and erected the families Elachistidae, Oecophoridae and Roeslerstammiidae and the geometrid tribes Ourapterygini and Hemitheini. He was a member of the Société entomologique de France. His macrolepidoptera and Psychidae collections are held by the Natural History Museum, London and the microlepidoptera by the Musee d'Histoire Naturelle, Paris.

== Works ==
- Bruand d'Uzelle, C. T. (1841) Notices sur quelques Lépidoptères très-rares, ou nouveaux pour le département du Doubs, Annales de la société d'émulation du Doubs
- Bruand d'Uzelle, C. T. (1845–47) Catalogue systématique et synonymique des lépidoptères du Département du Doubs, Annales de la société d'émulation du Doubs
- Bruand d'Uzelle, C. T. (1848) Monographie des Lépidoptères nuisibles, Annales de la société d'émulation du Doubs
- Bruand d'Uzelle, C. T. (1852) Monographie des Psychides, Annales de la société d'émulation du Doubs read online
- Bruand d'Uzelle, C. T. (1859) Essai monographique sur le genre Coleophora, Annales de la société entomologique de France.
- Bruand d'Uzelle, C. T. (1859) Observations sur divers lépidoptères, description d'espèces nouvelles propres à la faune française, Annales de la société entomologique de France.
