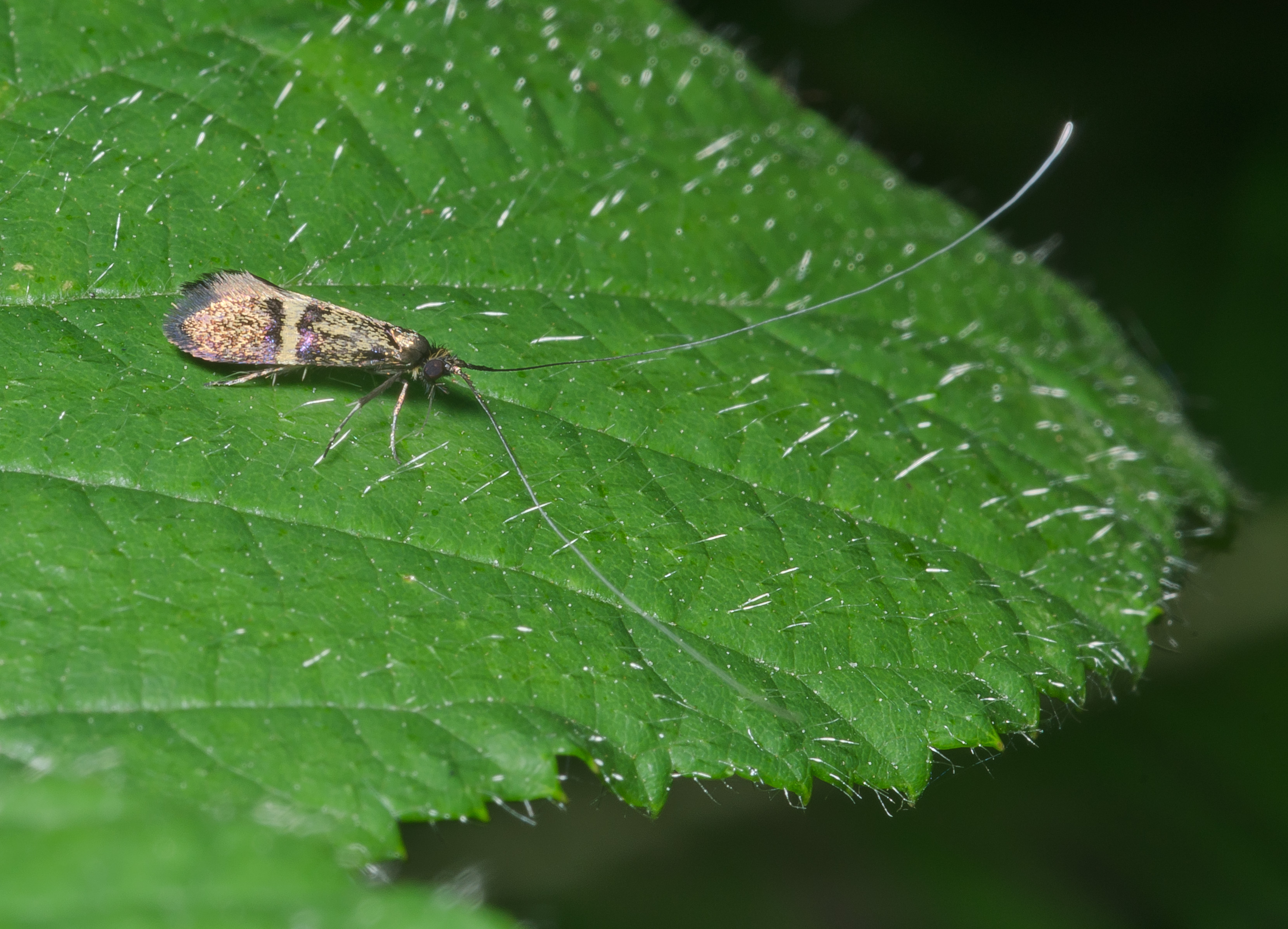
- Nemophora degeerella

Scientific classification
- Kingdom: Animalia
- Phylum: Arthropoda
- Clade: Pancrustacea
- Class: Insecta
- Order: Lepidoptera
- Superfamily: Adeloidea
- Family: Adelidae; Bruand, 1851

Diversity
- 2 subfamilies, 5 genera and 294 species

= Adelidae =

Fairy longhorn moths

Family of moths

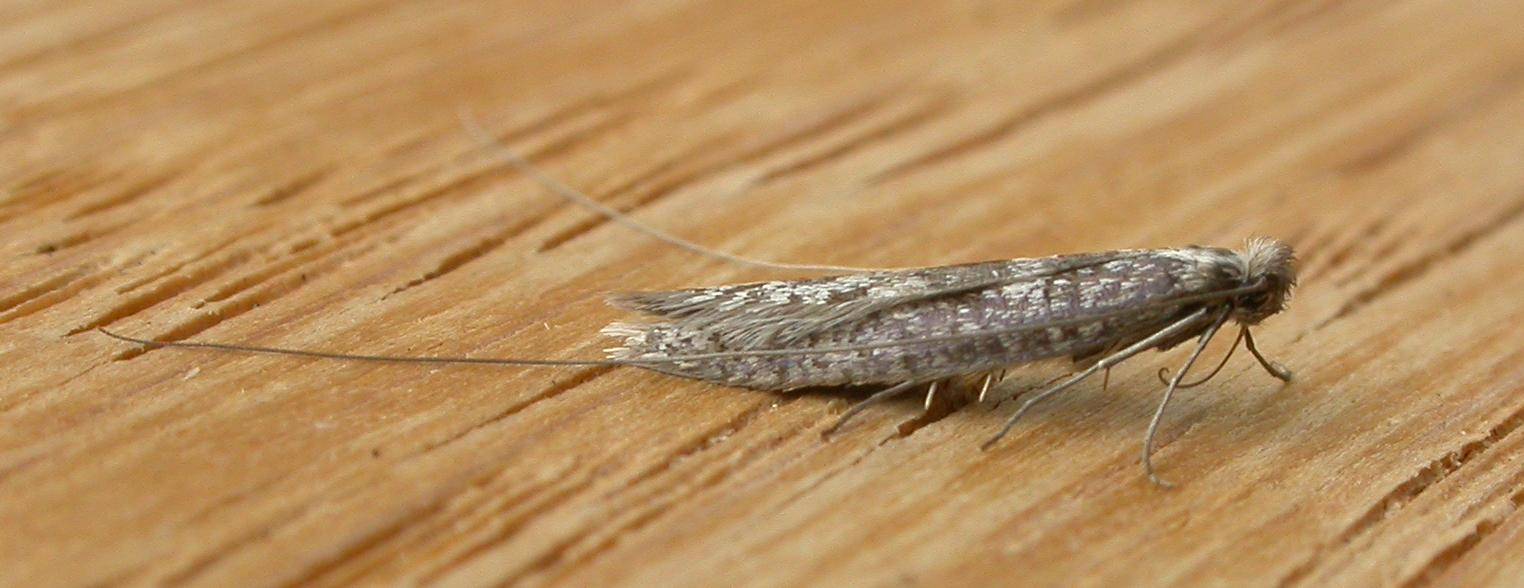
Ceromitia iolampra

The Adelidae or fairy longhorn moths are a family of monotrysian moths in the lepidopteran infraorder Heteroneura. The family was first described by Charles Théophile Bruand d'Uzelle in 1851. Most species have at least partially metallic, patterned coloration and are diurnal, sometimes swarming around the tips of branches with an undulating flight. Others are crepuscular and have a drab coloration. Fairy longhorn moths have a wingspan of 4–28 millimeters, and males often have especially long antennae, 1–3 times as long as the forewing.

They are widespread around the world and can be found over much of North America and Eurasia from April to June. About 50 species occur in Europe, of which most widely noted is the green longhorn (Adela reaumurella) which can sometimes reach great abundance; due to climate change its peak flying season is shifting towards spring. In general, they are more plentiful in the Northern Hemisphere, but the family occurs in the Neotropics, sub-Saharan Africa, South-East Asia and Australia too.

Adelidae appear in certain plants, in which the females insert their eggs or just lay among leaf litter, and the caterpillars make a case, completing their development on the ground. Fairy longhorn moths feed in sunshine on nectar from the flowers of herbaceous (woody) plants.

== Systematics ==
Fairy longhorn moths belong to the superfamily Adeloidea, one of the basal ("monotrysian") branches of the advanced moth infraorder Heteroneura. By lepidopteran standards, they are thus still rather primitive micromoths. But like other Heteroneura, they already possess the apomorphic sucking proboscis – usually considered a defining feature of Lepidoptera, but the most ancestral moths still live on solid food which they chew.

The Adelidae were previously placed as the subfamily Adelinae within the family Incurvariidae.

=== Subfamilies ===
The Adelidae are usually divided into two subfamilies, but most genera are of uncertain or basal relationships. Selected species are also listed:

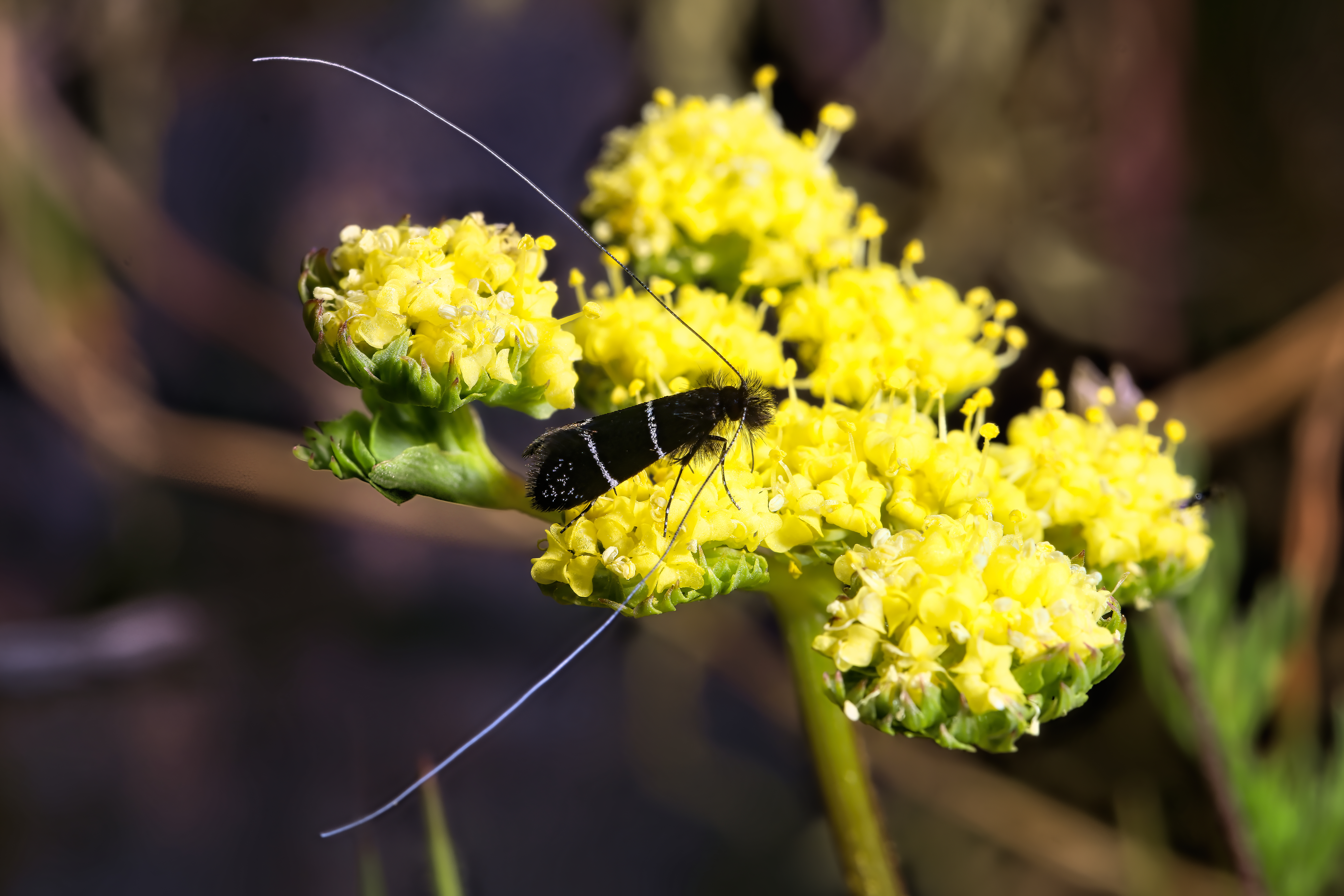
Fairy Longhorn Moth in California

Subfamily Adelinae

- Adela Latreille, 1796
  - Adela croesella
  - Adela reaumurella – green longhorn
- Cauchas Zeller, 1839
  - Cauchas rufimitrella
- Nemophora Illiger & Hoffmannsegg, 1798 (tentatively placed here)
  - Nemophora degeerella – longhorn moth
  - Nemophora metallica
  - Nemophora ochsenheimerella

Subfamily Nematopogoninae

- Ceromitia Zeller, 1852 (tentatively placed here)
  - Ceromitia iolampra
- Nematopogon

Incertae sedis

- Subclemensia
- Trichofrons

The genus Tridentaforma is sometimes placed among the Adelidae incertae sedis too; others assign it to the closely related Prodoxidae.
