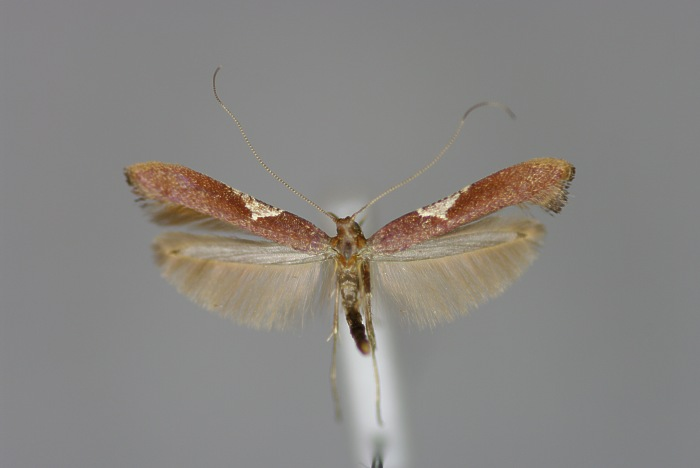

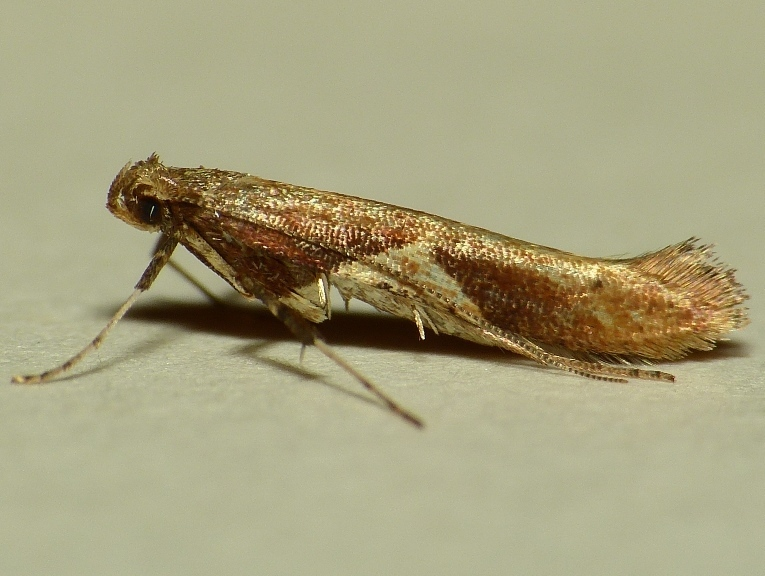

Scientific classification
- Domain: Eukaryota
- Kingdom: Animalia
- Phylum: Arthropoda
- Class: Insecta
- Order: Lepidoptera
- Family: Gracillariidae
- Genus: Caloptilia
- Species: C. stigmatella

Binomial name
- Caloptilia stigmatella (Fabricius, 1781)

Synonyms
- Tinea stigmatella Fabricius, 1781; Tinea upupaepennella Hubner, 1801

= Caloptilia stigmatella =

Species of moth

Caloptilia stigmatella is a moth of the family Gracillariidae. It is known from the Holarctic Region, including all of Europe (except the Balkan Peninsula).

The wingspan is 12–14 millimetres (0.47–0.55 in). The forewings are red -brown, darkest towards costal blotch; a triangular white median costal blotch, usually mixed with brown -reddish, on costa marked with several blackish dots, apex emitting a slender outwardly oblique streak towards dorsum. Hindwings are grey. The larva is green-whitish; head yellowish, brown-marked.

Adults are on wing in late June and July, and again from September onwards.

The larvae feed on Myrica gale, Populus alba, Populus candicans, Populus canescens, Populus nigra, Populus tremula, Salix alba, Salix aurita, Salix babylonica, Salix cinerea, Salix dasyclados, Salix elaeagnos, Salix fragilis, Salix glaucosericea, Salix lanata, Salix magnifica, Salix myrsinifolia, Salix pentandra, Salix purpurea, Salix repens, Salix sitchensis, Salix spadicea, Salix x stipularis, Salix triandra, Salix udensis and Salix viminalis. They mine the leaves of their host plant.
