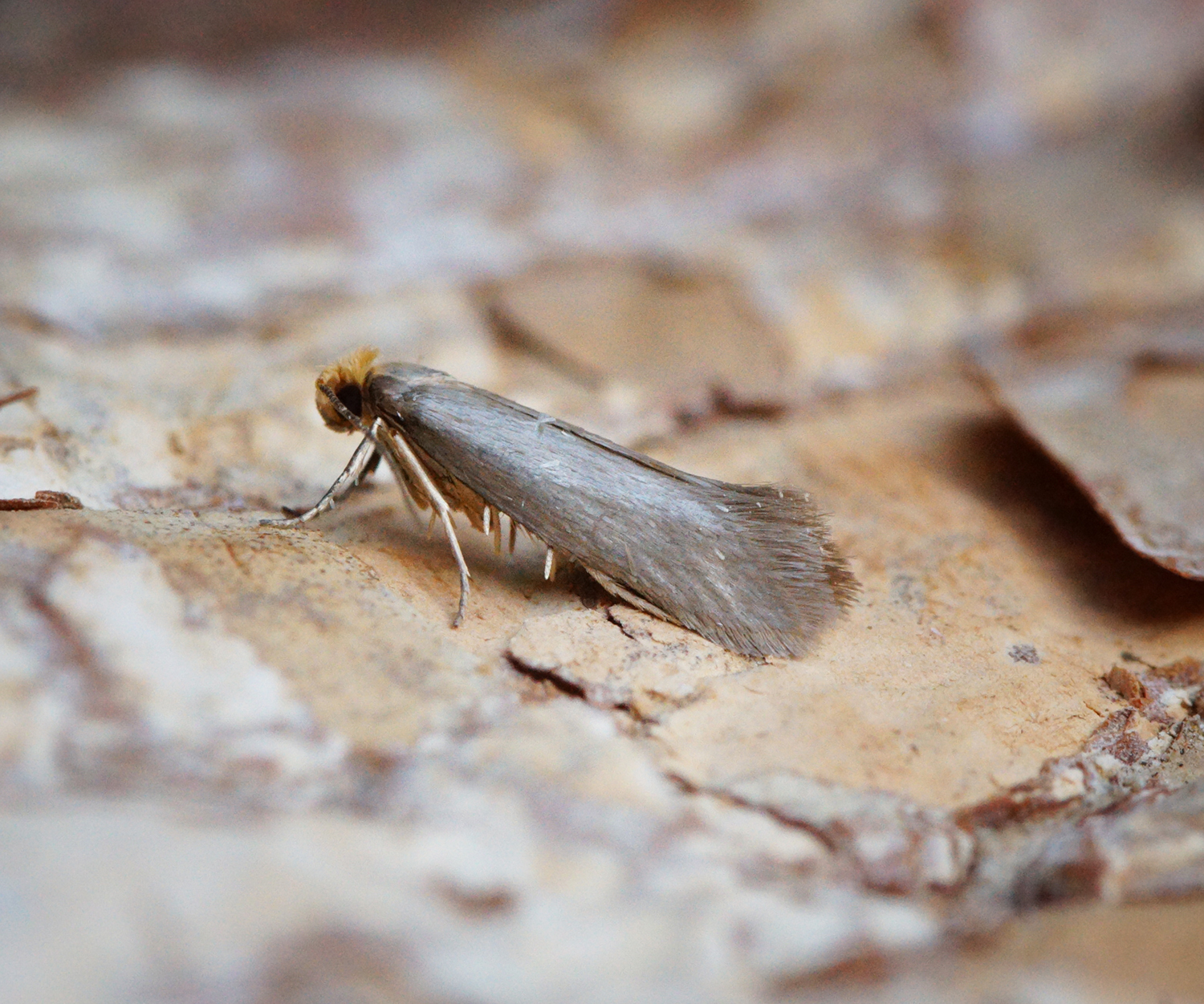

Scientific classification
- Kingdom: Animalia
- Phylum: Arthropoda
- Clade: Pancrustacea
- Class: Insecta
- Order: Lepidoptera
- Family: Argyresthiidae
- Genus: Argyresthia
- Species: A. laevigatella

Binomial name
- Argyresthia laevigatella (Heydenreich, 1851)

Synonyms
- Elachista laevigatella Heydenreich, 1851; Argyresthia atmoriella Bankes, 1896

= Argyresthia laevigatella =

Species of moth

Argyresthia laevigatella is a moth of the family Yponomeutidae. It is found in Europe and Japan.

The wingspan is 9–13 mm. It is very similar to Argyresthia glabratella. Certain identification requires dissection of the genitalia.

The moths are on wing from May to July depending on the location.

The larvae feed on Larix decidua.
