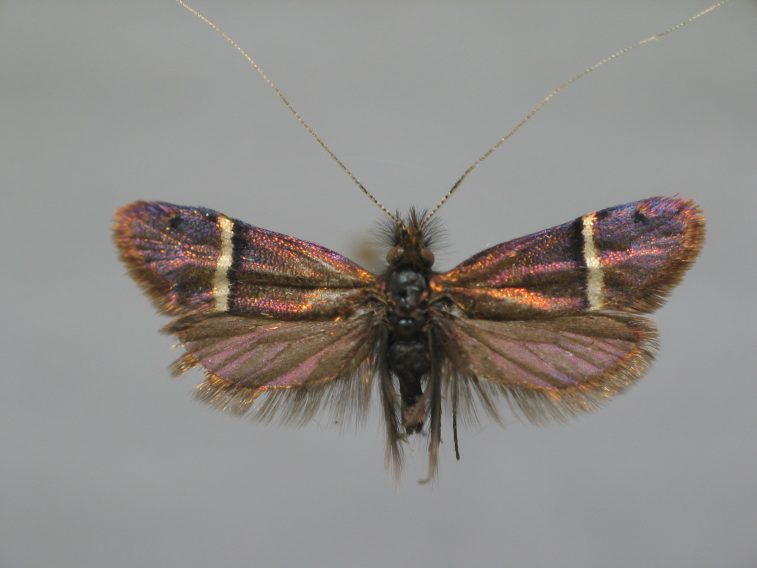

Scientific classification
- Kingdom: Animalia
- Phylum: Arthropoda
- Clade: Pancrustacea
- Class: Insecta
- Order: Lepidoptera
- Family: Adelidae
- Genus: Adela
- Species: A. albicinctella

Binomial name
- Adela albicinctella Mann, 1852

= Adela albicinctella =

Species of moth

Adela albicinctella is a moth of the family Adelidae. It is found in France, Germany, Switzerland, Austria, Italy, Slovakia and Poland. It was first described in 1852.

It is a montane species feeding first on the flowers of Salix glaucosericea then in the leaf litter.
