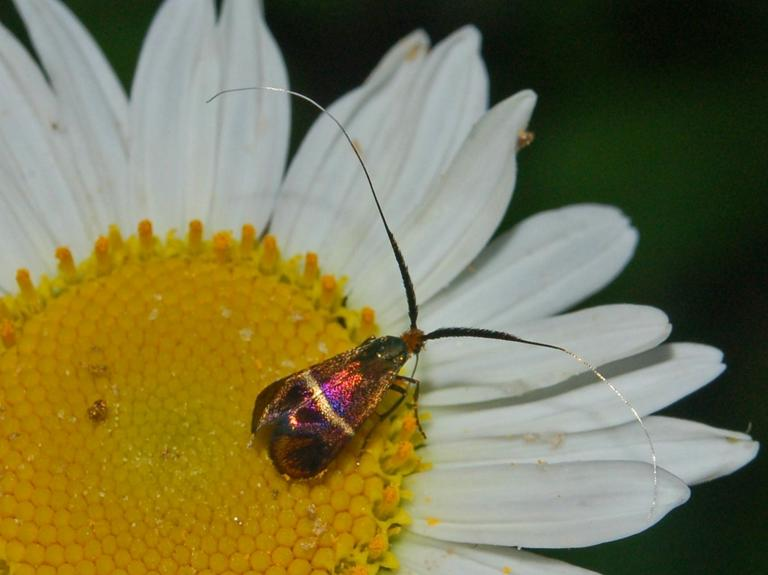
- Male

Scientific classification
- Domain: Eukaryota
- Kingdom: Animalia
- Phylum: Arthropoda
- Class: Insecta
- Order: Lepidoptera
- Family: Adelidae
- Genus: Adela
- Species: A. australis

Binomial name
- Adela australis (Heydenreich, 1851)

Synonyms
- Nematois australis Heydenreich, 1851; Adela aldrovandella Villers, 1789

= Adela australis =

Species of moth

Adela australis is a moth of the family Adelidae or fairy longhorn moths.

== Description ==
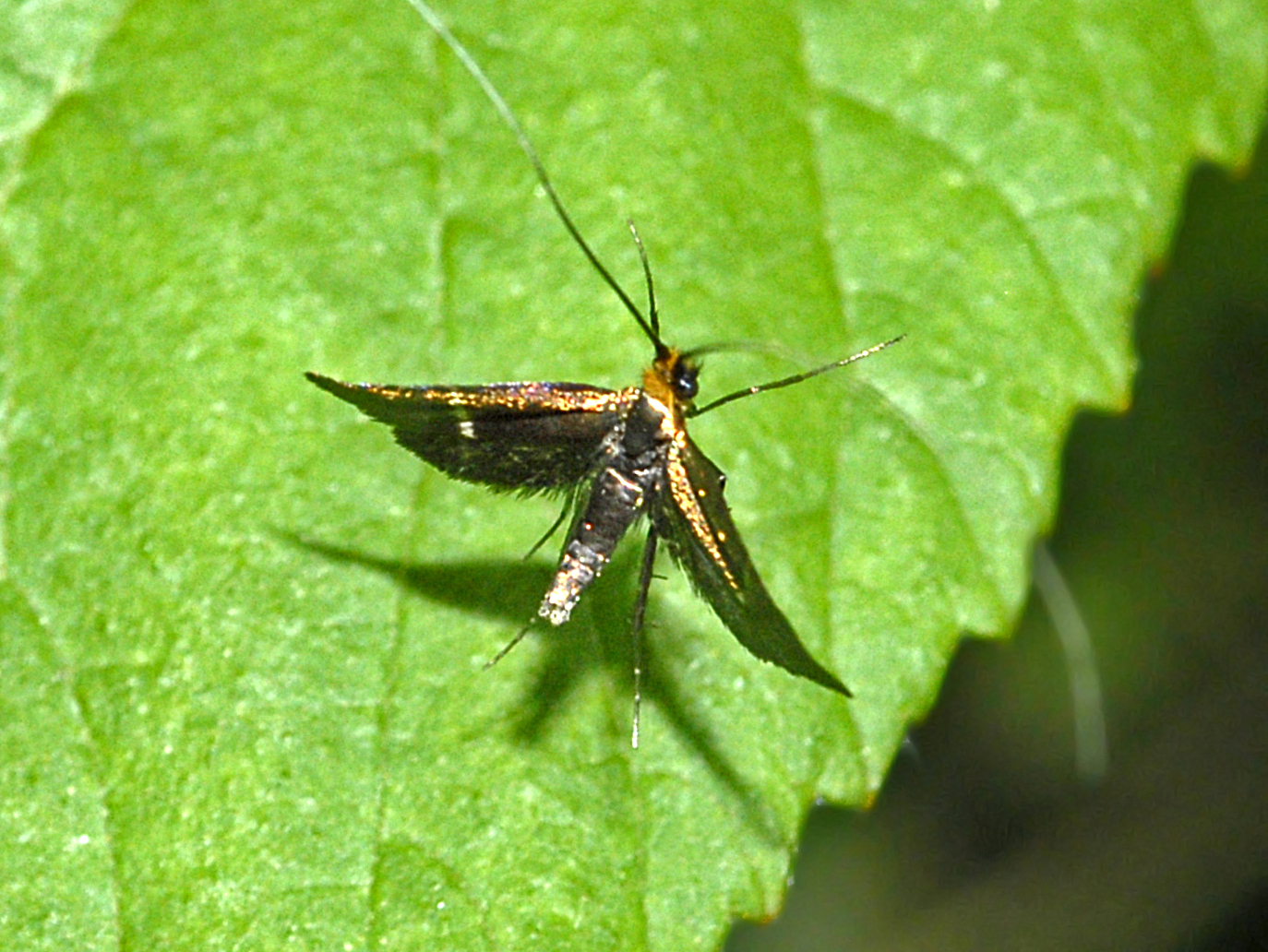
In flight

The wingspan of Adela australis can reach about 15 millimetres (0.59 in). These moths have the upper wings crossed by a white belt and a metallic patterns coloration ranging from golden to violet. Males have brown hair on their heads, with very long antennae, 2–3 times as long as the forewing.

They are diurnal and usually swarm around the tips of branches with undulating flights. Adults are on wing in May and June.

== Distribution ==
This species can be found in Spain, France, Italy, Switzerland, Albania and North Macedonia.
