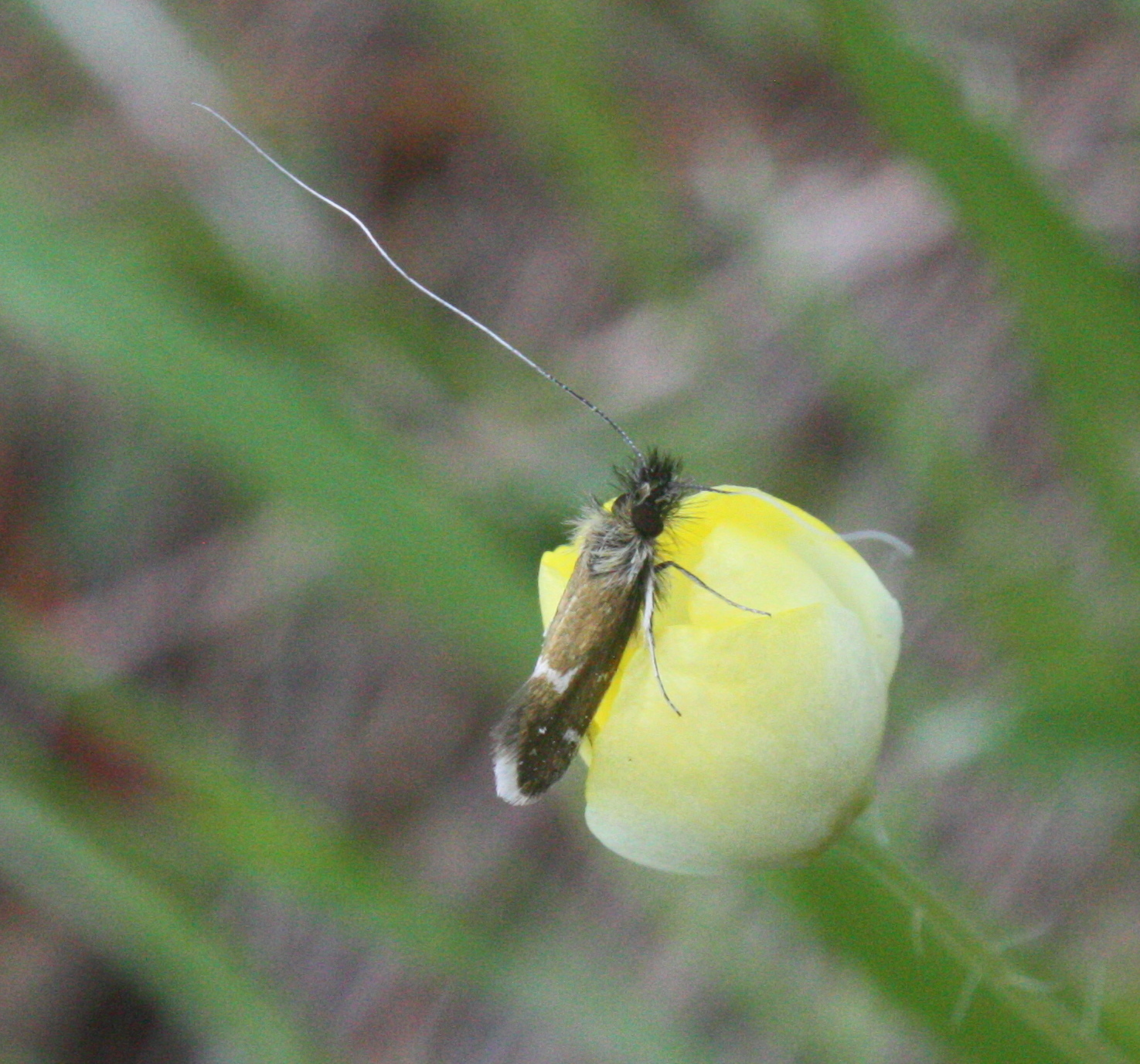
- Adela thorpella

Scientific classification
- Kingdom: Animalia
- Phylum: Arthropoda
- Clade: Pancrustacea
- Class: Insecta
- Order: Lepidoptera
- Family: Adelidae
- Genus: Adela
- Species: A. thorpella

Binomial name
- Adela thorpella Powell, 1969

= Adela thorpella =

Species of moth

Adela thorpella is a moth of the family Adelidae, the fairy longhorn moths. It was described by Jerry A. Powell in 1969. It is found in California.

The length of the forewings is 5.7–7 mm (0.22–0.28 in). The forewings are olivaceous-bronze, reflecting metallic brass, at times overlaid with pale yellowish scales and either without markings or (more usually) at least a trace of a white spot pattern. The hindwings are brown, faintly reflecting purplish.

== Etymology ==
The species is named for Robbin W. Thorp.
