= Adela homalella =

Scientific classification
- Kingdom: Animalia
- Phylum: Arthropoda
- Clade: Pancrustacea
- Class: Insecta
- Order: Lepidoptera
- Family: Adelidae
- Genus: Adela
- Species: A. homalella

Binomial name
- Adela homalella Staudinger, 1859

Synonyms
- Adela rebeliella Schawerda, 1910

Species of moth

Adela homalella is a moth of the family Adelidae. It is found in Spain, Austria, Bosnia and Herzegovina, Serbia, Montenegro, Albania and North Macedonia.
