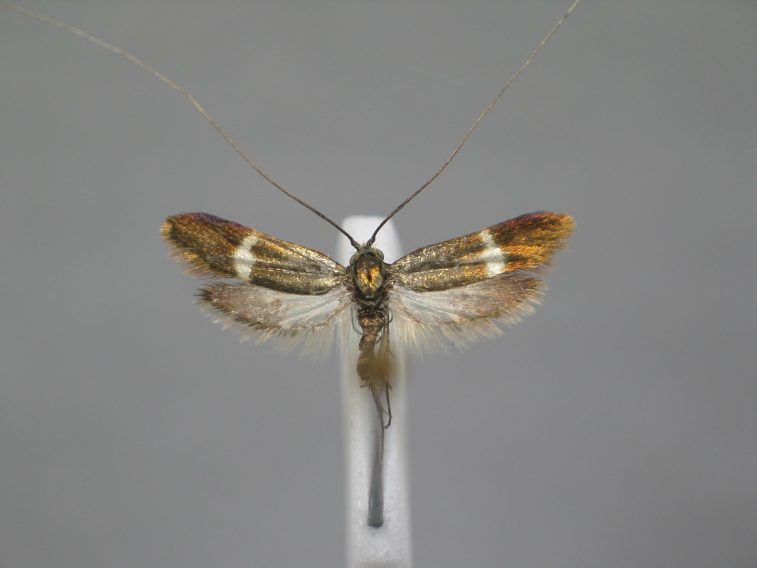

Scientific classification
- Kingdom: Animalia
- Phylum: Arthropoda
- Clade: Pancrustacea
- Class: Insecta
- Order: Lepidoptera
- Family: Adelidae
- Genus: Adela
- Species: A. mazzolella

Binomial name
- Adela mazzolella (Hubner, 1801)

Synonyms
- Tinea mazzolella Hubner, 1801

= Adela mazzolella =

Species of moth

Adela mazzolella is a moth of the family Adelidae. It is found in France, Spain, Germany, Austria, Italy, the Czech Republic, Slovakia, Poland, Hungary, Romania, Greece, Russia and Turkey.

The wingspan is 10–12 mm.

The larvae feed on lichen.
