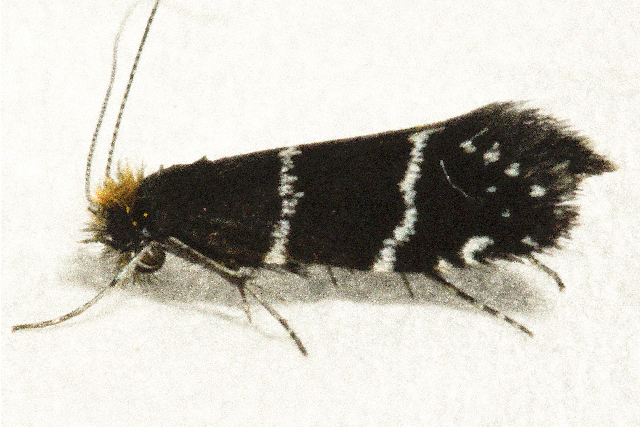

Scientific classification
- Domain: Eukaryota
- Kingdom: Animalia
- Phylum: Arthropoda
- Class: Insecta
- Order: Lepidoptera
- Family: Adelidae
- Genus: Adela
- Species: A. septentrionella

Binomial name
- Adela septentrionella Walsingham, 1880

= Adela septentrionella =

Species of moth

Adela septentrionella is a moth of the family Adelidae or fairy longhorn moths. It was described by Walsingham in 1880. It is widespread from southern British Columbia and north-western Idaho to the Transverse Range in southern California.

The length of the forewings is 4.5–5.7 mm. Adults are on wing from mid April to mid July.

The larvae feed on buds of Holodiscus discolor. Pupation takes place in late March or April.
