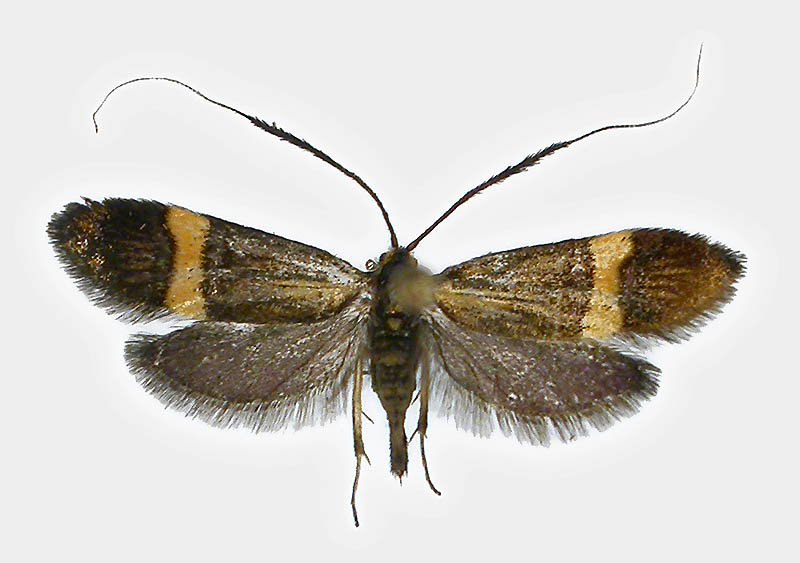

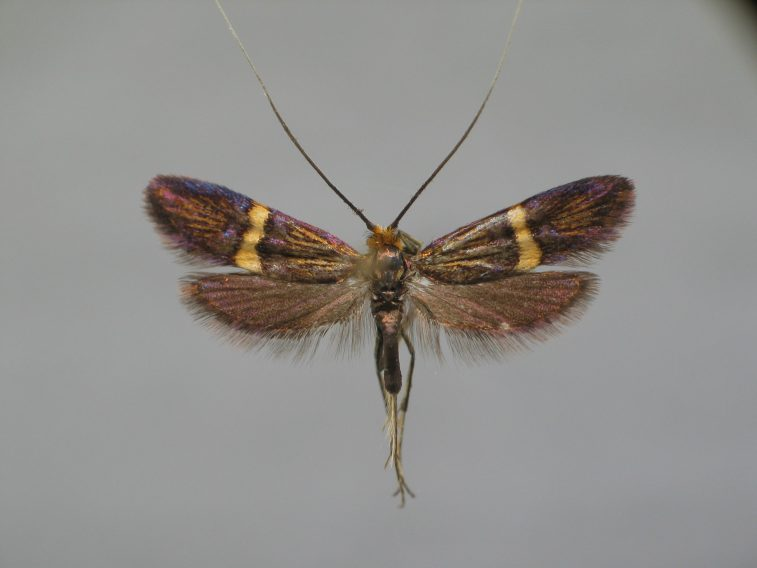

Scientific classification
- Domain: Eukaryota
- Kingdom: Animalia
- Phylum: Arthropoda
- Class: Insecta
- Order: Lepidoptera
- Family: Adelidae
- Genus: Adela
- Species: A. croesella

Binomial name
- Adela croesella (Scopoli, 1763)

Synonyms
- Phalaena croesella Scopoli, 1763; Adela religatella Zeller, 1850

= Adela croesella =

Species of moth

Adela croesella is a moth of the family Adelidae. It is found in most of Europe.

The wingspan is 11–14 mm. The head is ferruginous mixed with black. The antennae in male 2.5 [the length of the forewing], black, the tip white; in female hardly 1.5, thickened with violet-black scales to above middle, remainder white. The forewings are shining dark violet fuscous, more or less streaked suffusely between veins with golden-ochreous with a straight deep yellow fascia close beyond middle, narrower costally, edged first with dark fuscous and then with narrow violet fasciae. The hindwings are dark purplish fuscous.

Adults are on wing from late May to June. They are on wing during the day in sunshine and visit flowers. [14.7 x 21.2 cm] At first, the larvae probably feed on flowers of Hippophae rhamnoides or Ligustrum vulgare. Older larvae built a portable case from leaf fragments and particles of soil and feed on fallen leaves.

== Gallery ==
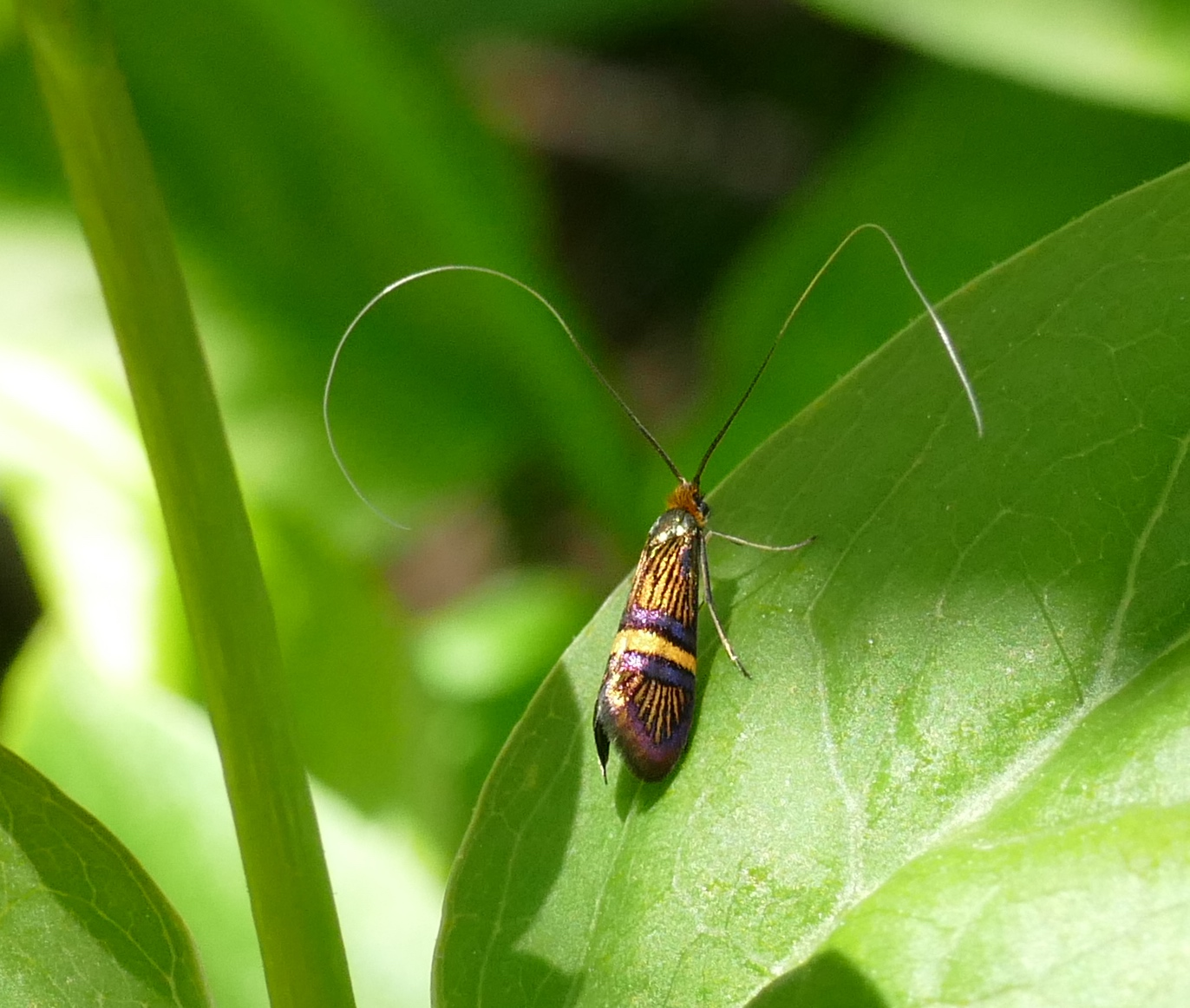

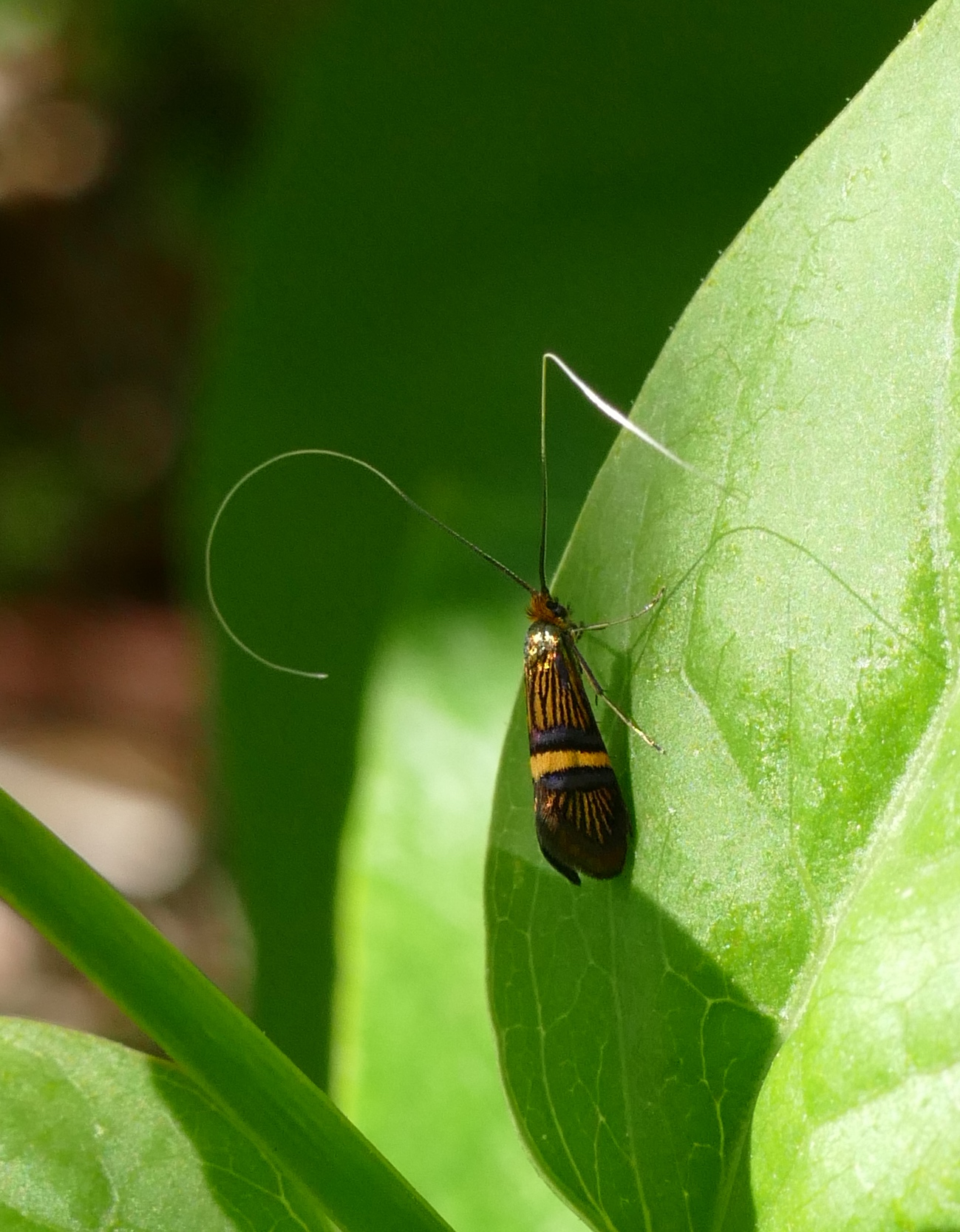

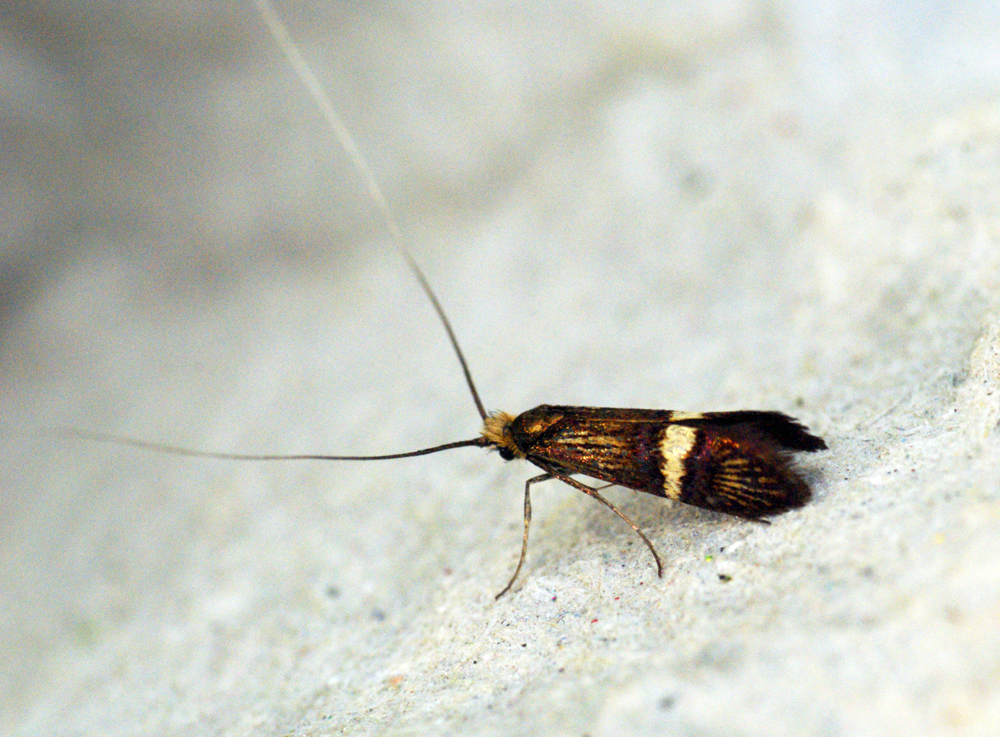

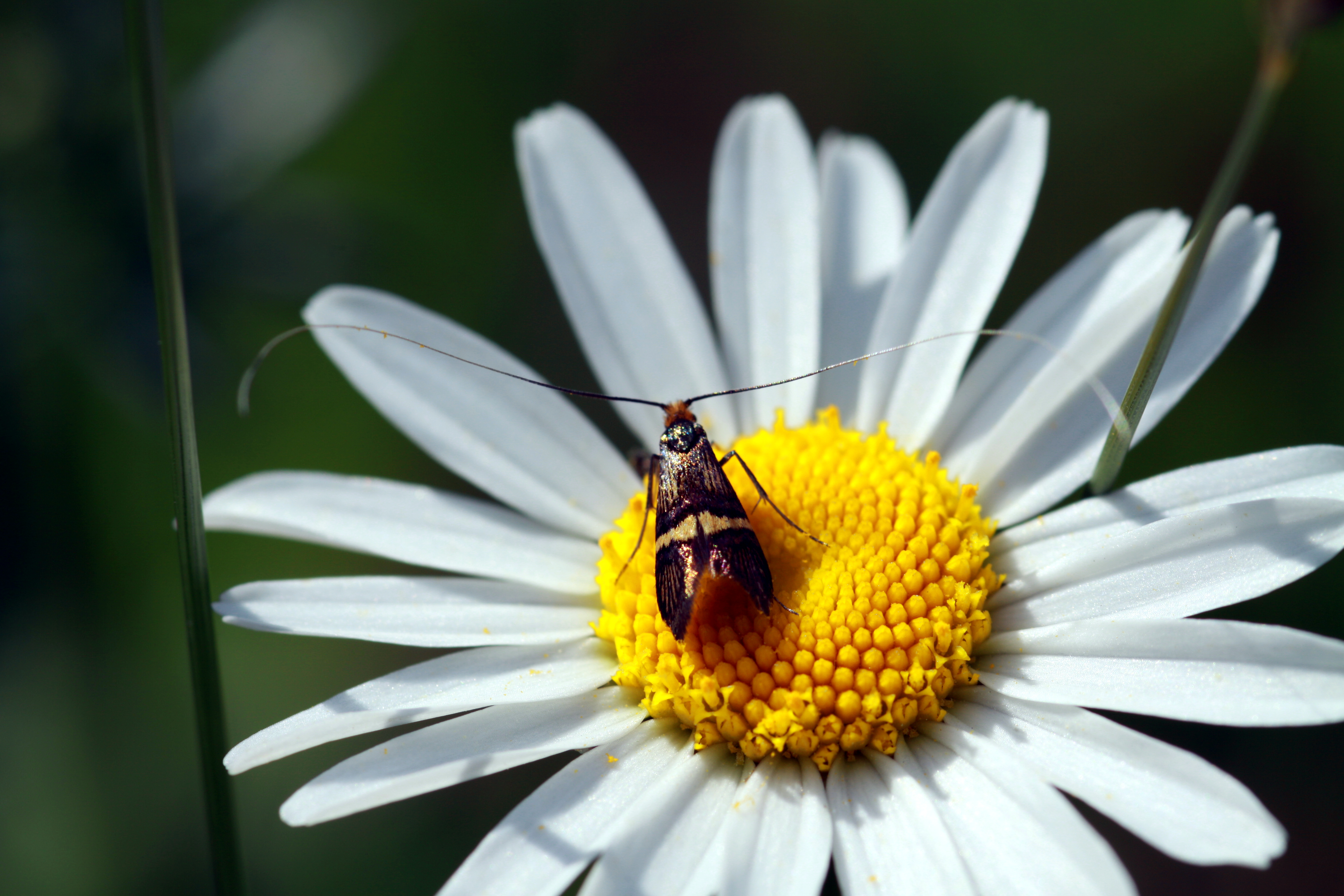
