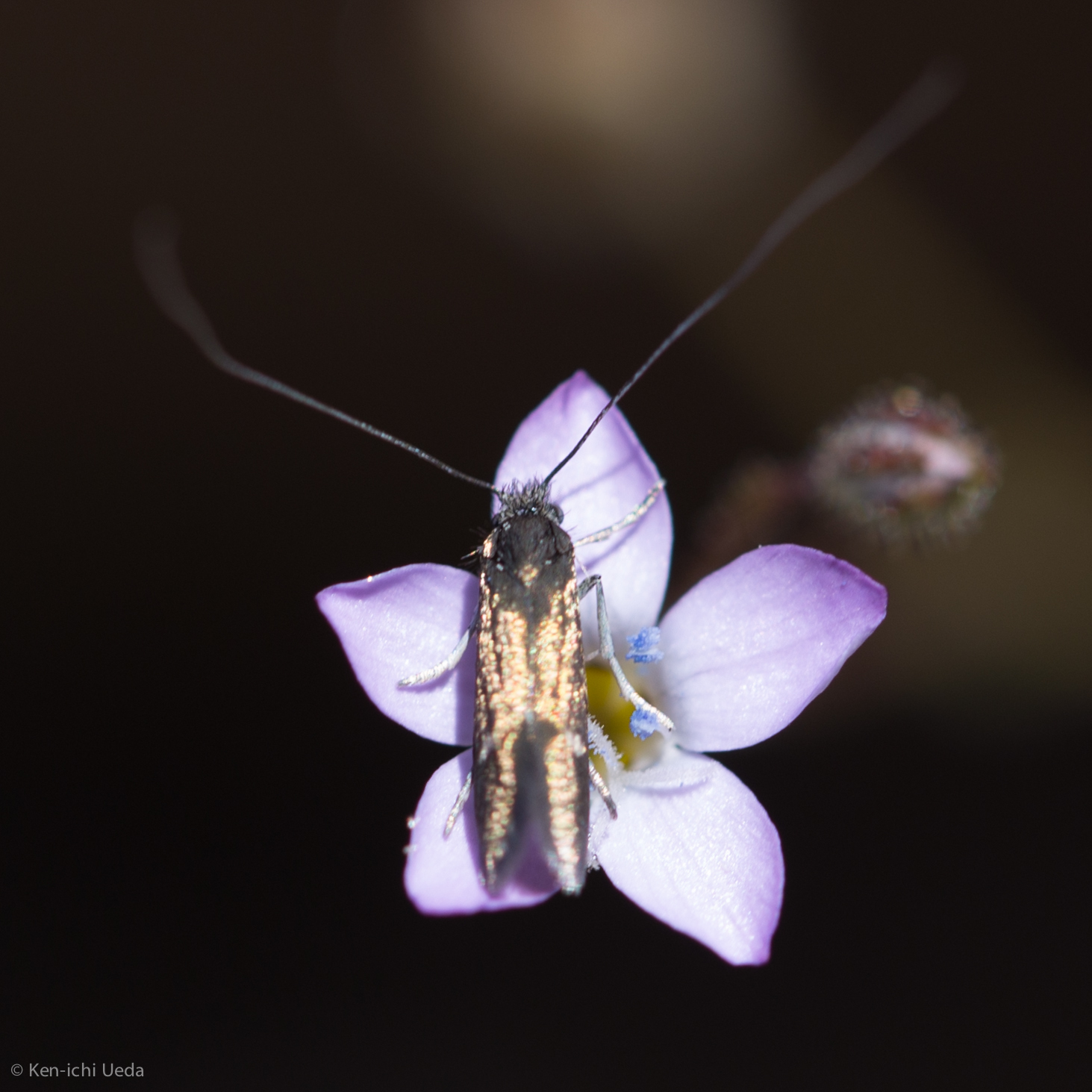

Scientific classification
- Domain: Eukaryota
- Kingdom: Animalia
- Phylum: Arthropoda
- Class: Insecta
- Order: Lepidoptera
- Family: Adelidae
- Genus: Adela
- Species: A. punctiferella

Binomial name
- Adela punctiferella Walsingham, 1870

= Adela punctiferella =

Species of moth

Adela punctiferella is a moth of the family Adelidae or fairy longhorn moths. It was described by Walsingham in 1870. It is found in the semi-arid parts of California and southern Nevada.
