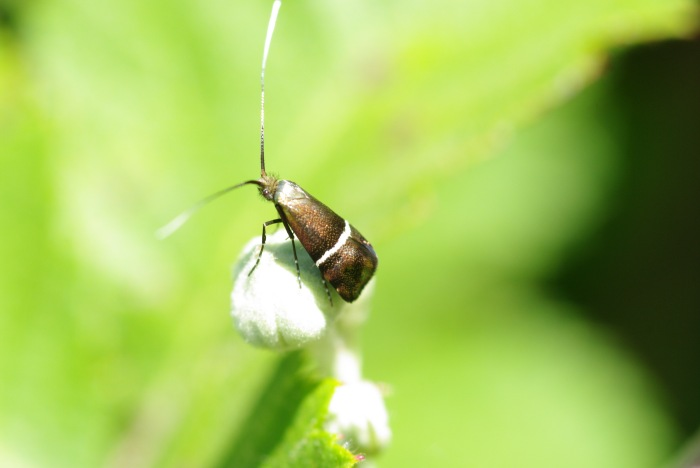
- Adela paludicolella Crete, Greece

Scientific classification
- Kingdom: Animalia
- Phylum: Arthropoda
- Clade: Pancrustacea
- Class: Insecta
- Order: Lepidoptera
- Family: Adelidae
- Genus: Adela
- Species: A. paludicolella

Binomial name
- Adela paludicolella Zeller, 1850

Synonyms
- Adela orientella Staudinger, 1870

= Adela paludicolella =

Species of moth

Adela paludicolella is a moth of the family Adelidae. It is found in Italy, Greece and on Corsica, Sardinia, Crete and Cyprus.
