= Adela cuneella =

Scientific classification
- Domain: Eukaryota
- Kingdom: Animalia
- Phylum: Arthropoda
- Class: Insecta
- Order: Lepidoptera
- Family: Adelidae
- Genus: Adela
- Species: A. cuneella

Binomial name
- Adela cuneella Walsingham, 1891

Species of moth

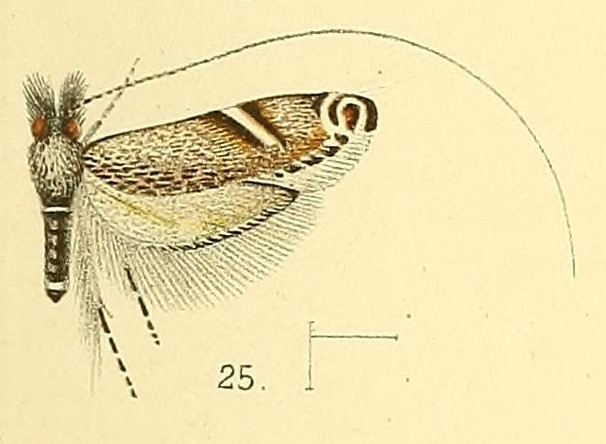
Adela cuneella

Adela cuneella is a species of moth of the family Adelidae. It is known from South Africa.
