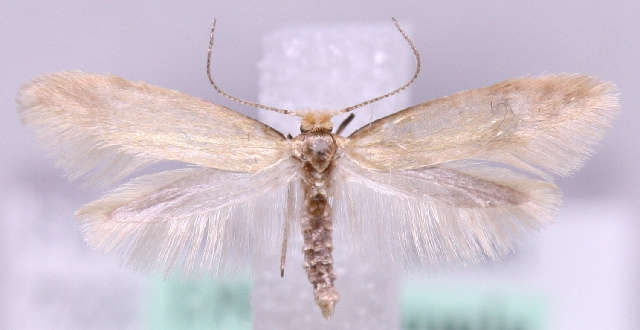

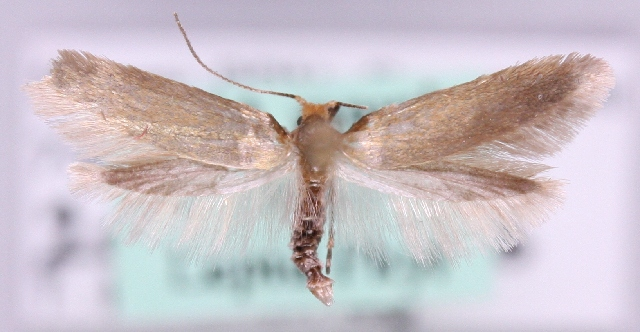

Scientific classification
- Kingdom: Animalia
- Phylum: Arthropoda
- Clade: Pancrustacea
- Class: Insecta
- Order: Lepidoptera
- Family: Argyresthiidae
- Genus: Argyresthia
- Species: A. glabratella

Binomial name
- Argyresthia glabratella (Zeller, 1847)

Synonyms
- Blastotere glabratella Zeller, 1847; Argyresthia (Blastotere) glabratella

= Argyresthia glabratella =

Species of moth

Argyresthia glabratella, the spruce argent, is a moth of the family Yponomeutidae. It is found in most Europe, except Ireland, the Iberian Peninsula, Hungary, Slovenia, Croatia and Greece.

The wingspan is 8–11 mm. It is very similar to Argyresthia laevigatella. Certain identification requires dissection of the genitalia. Adults are on wing in May and June.

The larvae feed on Picea abies. They mine the shoots of their host plant.
