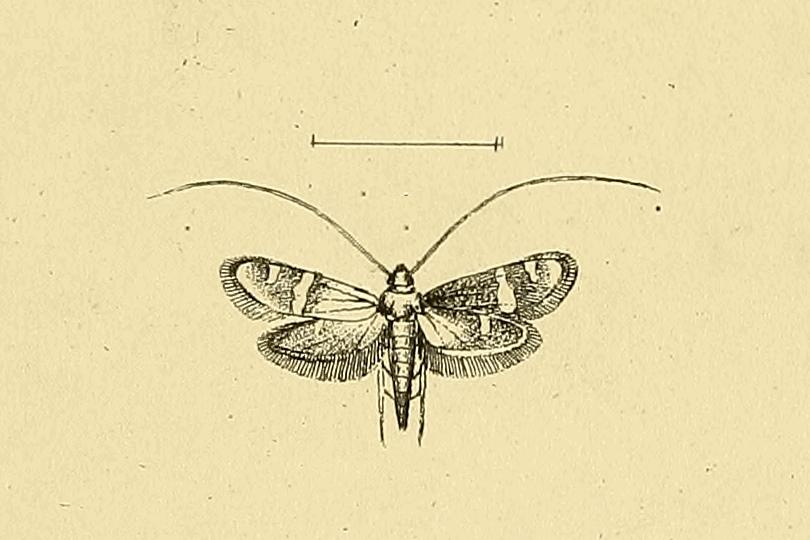

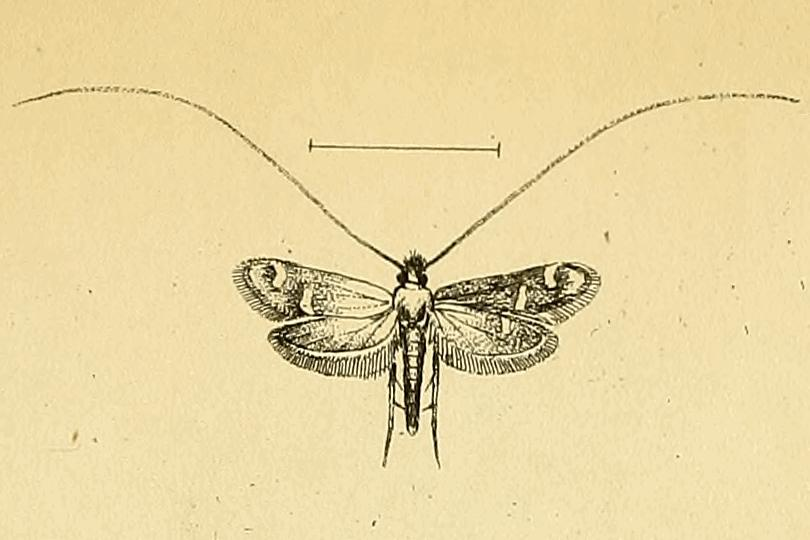

Scientific classification
- Kingdom: Animalia
- Phylum: Arthropoda
- Clade: Pancrustacea
- Class: Insecta
- Order: Lepidoptera
- Family: Adelidae
- Genus: Adela
- Species: A. repetitella

Binomial name
- Adela repetitella Mann, 1861

= Adela repetitella =

Species of moth

Adela repetitella is a moth of the Adelidae family. It is found in most of Greece and Turkey.
