= Adela natalensis =

Scientific classification
- Kingdom: Animalia
- Phylum: Arthropoda
- Clade: Pancrustacea
- Class: Insecta
- Order: Lepidoptera
- Family: Adelidae
- Genus: Adela
- Species: A. natalensis

Binomial name
- Adela natalensis Stainton, 1860

Synonyms
- Adela albicornis Walker, 1863

Species of moth

Adela natalensis is a species of moth of the family Adelidae. It is known from South Africa.
