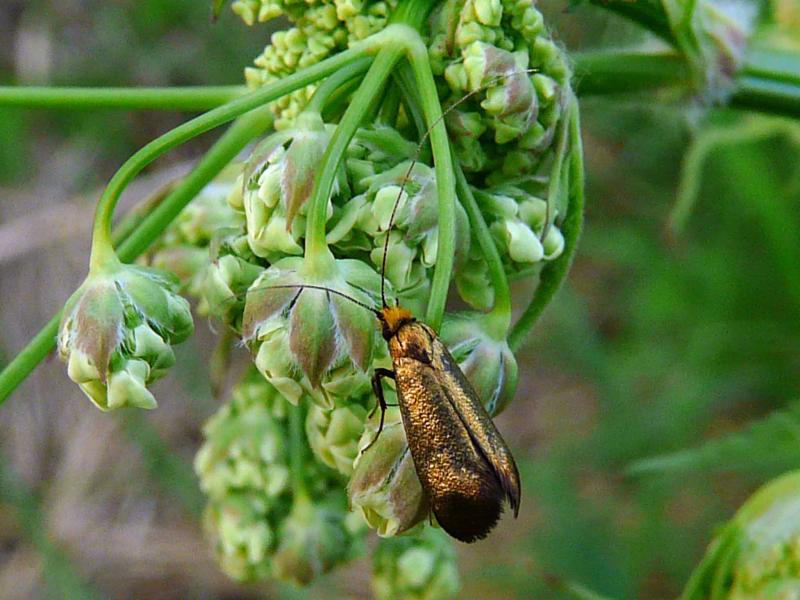
- Female
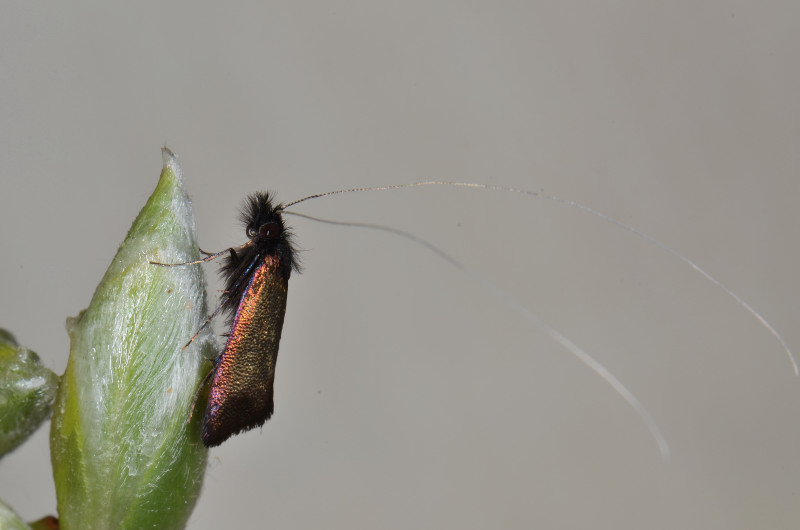
- Male

Scientific classification
- Kingdom: Animalia
- Phylum: Arthropoda
- Clade: Pancrustacea
- Class: Insecta
- Order: Lepidoptera
- Family: Adelidae
- Genus: Adela
- Species: A. cuprella

Binomial name
- Adela cuprella (Denis & Schiffermuller, 1775)

Synonyms
- Tinea cuprella Denis & Schiffermuller, 1775

= Adela cuprella =

Species of moth

Adela cuprella is a moth of the family Adelidae and are found in most of Europe. It was first described by Michael Denis & Ignaz Schiffermüller in 1775 and the type locality is from Austria. They can be found flying around sallows (Salix) species during the day in April and May.

== Description ==
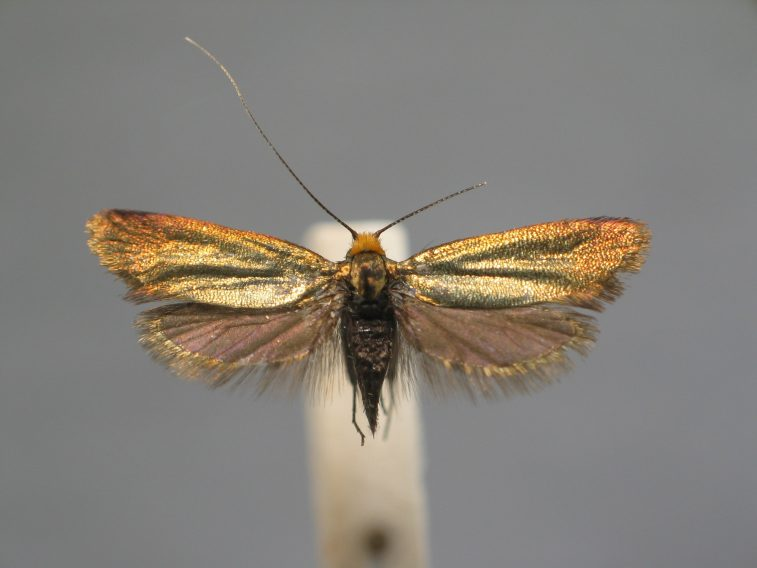

The wingspan is 14–17 mm. The head in males is black, in female ferruginous, the face in females is hairy. Antennae in males are 2.5 [the length of the forewing], white, towards the base blackish ringed; in females 1.25 black and not thickened, towards apex white.The hindwings are purple-fuscous.

Adults are active by day and are on wing from mid April to early May, flying around willows.

== Life cycle ==
The moths are univoltine (i.e. one generation a year) and visit the flowers of sallows, usually high up. In some years, they can be numerous and in other years, scarce or absent. The females lay their eggs on the catkins of sallows. The case is an elongate-oval shape with each half made of several, roughly crescentic pieces of dead sallow leaves. The larvae feed from May onwards and can overwinter two or three times. Pupation takes place within the case in March.

== Distribution ==
It is found in most of Europe, except Portugal, Slovenia and most of the Balkan Peninsula.
