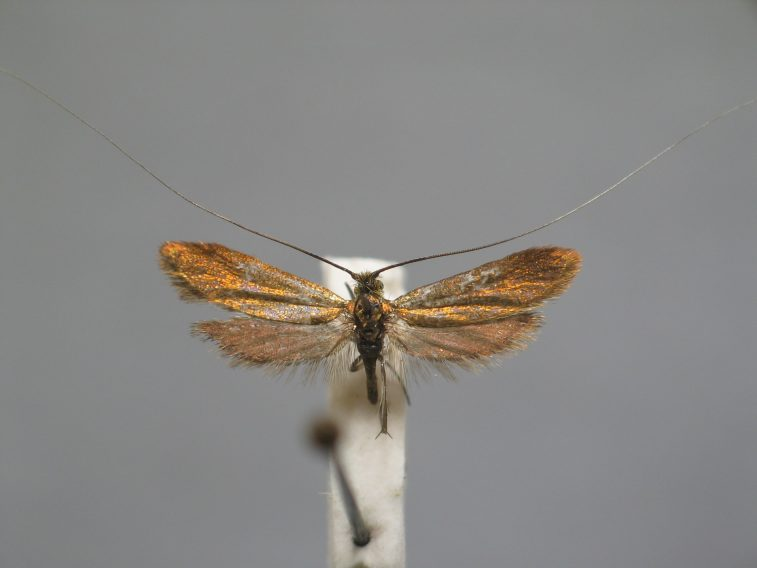

Scientific classification
- Kingdom: Animalia
- Phylum: Arthropoda
- Clade: Pancrustacea
- Class: Insecta
- Order: Lepidoptera
- Family: Adelidae
- Genus: Adela
- Species: A. violella

Binomial name
- Adela violella (Denis & Schiffermüller, 1775)

Synonyms
- Tinea violella Denis & Schiffermüller, 1775; Adela tombacinella Herrich-Schaffer, 1855

= Adela violella =

Species of moth

Adela violella is a moth of the Adelidae family. It is found in most of Europe, except Ireland, Great Britain, Fennoscandia, the Baltic region, Croatia, Greece and Portugal.

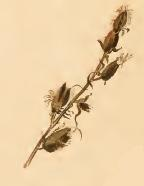
A sprig of Hypericum perforatum harbouring larva

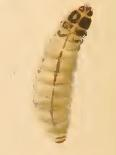
Larva

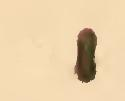
Larval case

The wingspan is about 11 mm. Adults are on wing from June to July.

The larvae feed on the flowers and seeds of St. John's wort (Hypericum perforatum).
