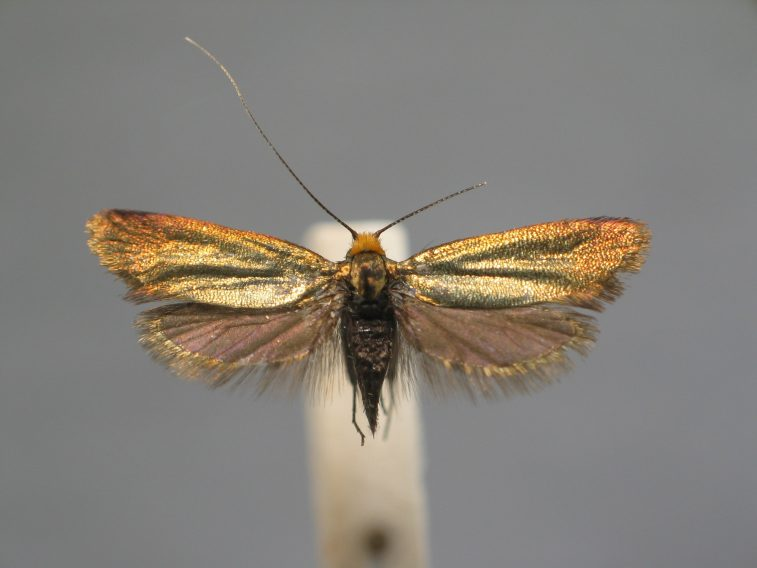
- Adela cuprella

Scientific classification
- Kingdom: Animalia
- Phylum: Arthropoda
- Clade: Pancrustacea
- Class: Insecta
- Order: Lepidoptera
- Family: Adelidae
- Subfamily: Adelinae
- Genus: Adela; Latreille, 1796

Species
- Several, see text

Synonyms
- Capillaria Haworth, 1828; Metallitis Sodoffsky, 1837; Aedilis Gistl, 1848; Dicte Chambers, 1873

= Adela (moth) =

Moth genus in family Adelidae

Adela is a genus of the fairy longhorn moth family (Adelidae). Among these, it belongs to subfamily Adelinae.

== Species ==
- Adela albicinctella Mann, 1852
- Adela australis (Herrich-Schäffer, 1855)
- Adela caeruleella Walker, 1863 – (southern longhorn moth)
- Adela collicolella (Walsingham, 1904)
- Adela croesella (Scopoli, 1763)
- Adela cuneella Walsingham, 1891
- Adela cuprella (Denis & Schiffermüller, 1775)
- Adela droseropa Meyrick, 1921
- Adela eldorada Powell, 1969
- Adela electella (Walker, 1863)
- Adela flammeusella Chambers, 1876
- Adela gymnota (Meyrick, 1912)
- Adela homalella (Staudinger, 1859)
- Adela janineae (Viette, 1954)
- Adela mazzolella (Hübner, 1801)
- Adela natalensis Stainton, 1860
- Adela oplerella Powell, 1969 (Opler's longhorn moth)
- Adela paludicolella (Zeller, 1850)
- Adela pantherellus (Guenée, 1848)
- Adela punctiferella Walsingham, 1870
- Adela purpurea Walker, 1863
- Adela reaumurella (Linnaeus, 1758) (green longhorn)
- Adela repetitella Mann, 1861
- Adela ridingsella Clemens, 1864 – (Ridings' fairy moth)
- Adela septentrionella Walsingham, 1880
- Adela singulella Walsingham, 1880
- Adela thorpella Powell, 1969
- Adela trigrapha Zeller, 1876
- Adela tsaratanana (Viette, 1954)
- Adela violella (Denis & Schiffermüller, 1775)
