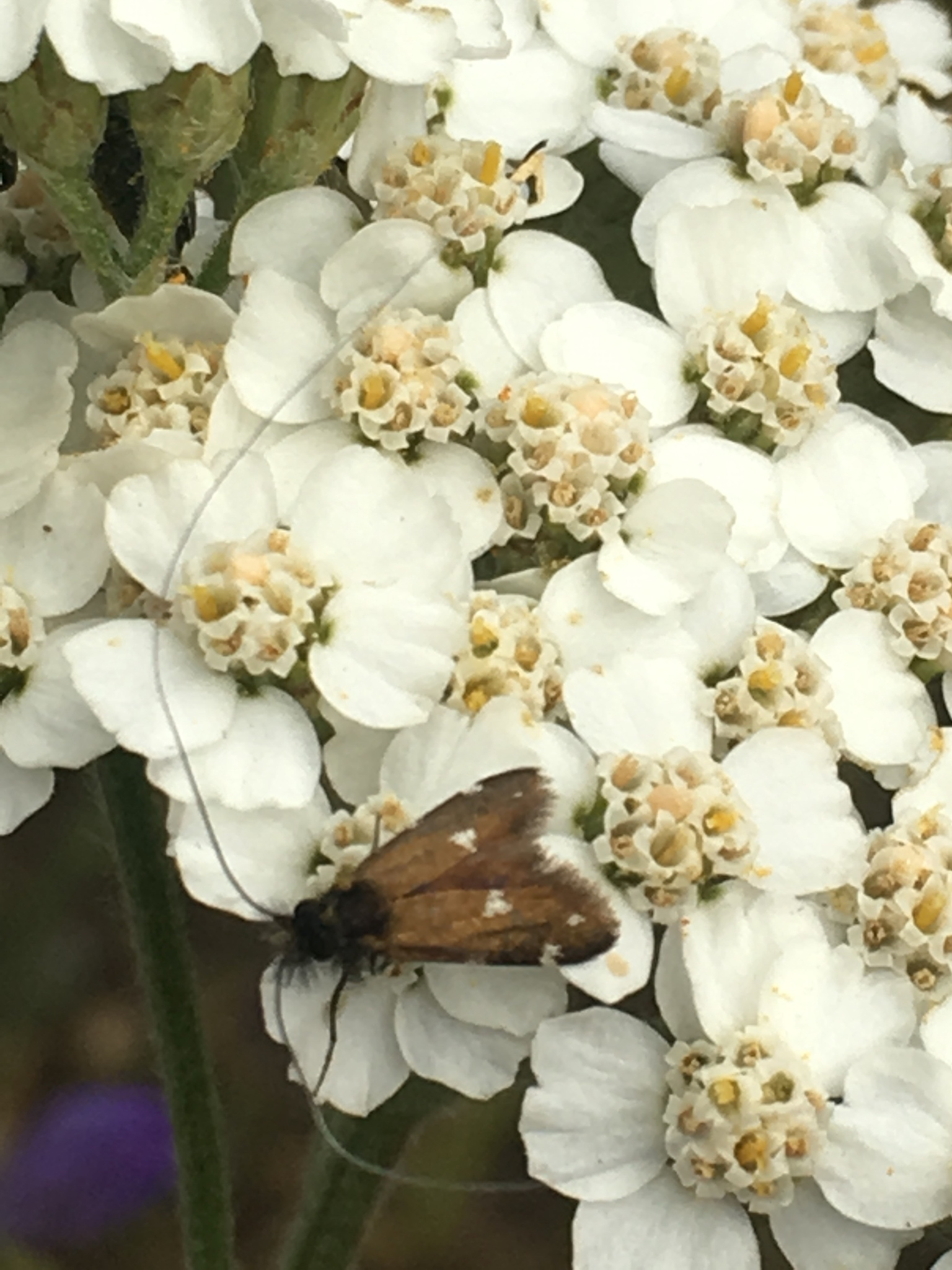

Scientific classification
- Domain: Eukaryota
- Kingdom: Animalia
- Phylum: Arthropoda
- Class: Insecta
- Order: Lepidoptera
- Family: Adelidae
- Genus: Adela
- Species: A. flammeusella

Binomial name
- Adela flammeusella Chambers, 1876

Synonyms
- Adela lactimaculella Walsingham, 1880

= Adela flammeusella =

Species of moth

Adela flammeusella is a moth of the family Adelidae or fairy longhorn moths. It was described by Vactor Tousey Chambers in 1876. It is found in the United States from southern Washington south to the foothills and interior valleys of most of cismontane California.

The length of the forewings is 5–6 mm. Both sexes have metallic purple hindwings. Adults are on wing from late March to early June.

The larvae probably feed on various species of Orthocarpus and/or Castilleja.
