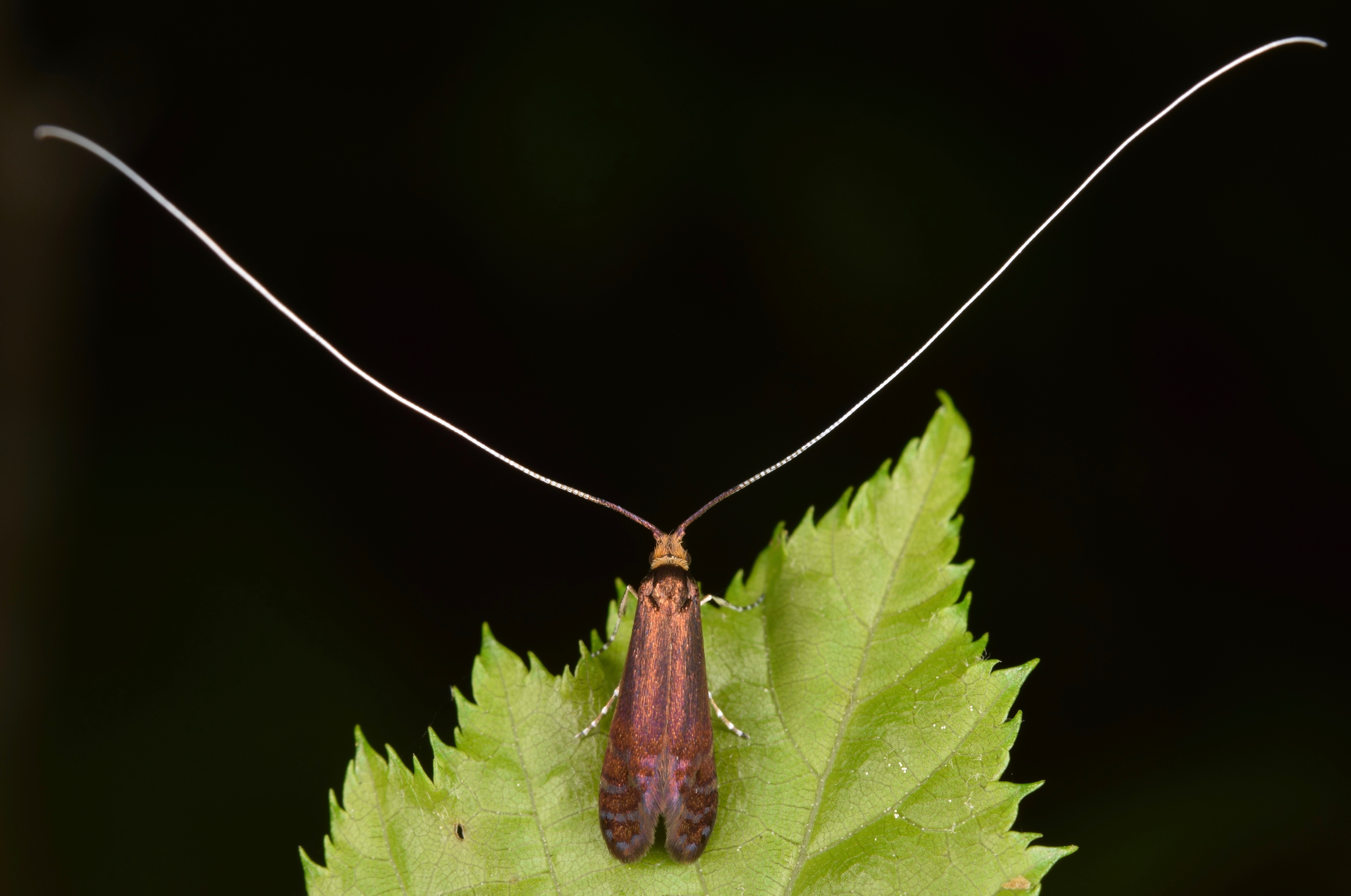
- Male

Scientific classification
- Domain: Eukaryota
- Kingdom: Animalia
- Phylum: Arthropoda
- Class: Insecta
- Order: Lepidoptera
- Family: Adelidae
- Genus: Adela
- Species: A. caeruleella

Binomial name
- Adela caeruleella Walker, 1863

Synonyms
- Adela bella Chambers, 1873; Adela chalybeis Zeller, 1873; Adela iochora Zeller, 1877; Adela aeruginosella Walsingham, 1890

= Adela caeruleella =

Southern longhorn moth

Species of moth

Adela caeruleella, the southern longhorn moth, is a moth of the family Adelidae or fairy longhorn moths. It was described by Francis Walker in 1863. It is found in North America, including Alabama, Arkansas, Florida, Illinois, Kentucky, Louisiana, Maryland, Mississippi, North Carolina, Ohio, Oklahoma, Pennsylvania, South Carolina, Tennessee, Texas, Virginia and West Virginia.

Adults have been recorded on wing in March in Florida, from April to May northward and in August in Quebec.
