= Adela collicolella =

Scientific classification
- Kingdom: Animalia
- Phylum: Arthropoda
- Clade: Pancrustacea
- Class: Insecta
- Order: Lepidoptera
- Family: Adelidae
- Genus: Adela
- Species: A. collicolella

Binomial name
- Adela collicolella Walsingham, 1904

Species of moth

Adela collicolella is a moth of the family Adelidae. It is found in Spain and Portugal, as well as North Africa, including Morocco.

The wingspan is 11–12.5 mm for males and 13–14.5 mm for females. The forewings are shiny bronzy metallic, with a golden sheen. The costa is tinged with purple throughout. The hindwings are rich purple.
