= Adela tsaratanana =

Scientific classification
- Domain: Eukaryota
- Kingdom: Animalia
- Phylum: Arthropoda
- Class: Insecta
- Order: Lepidoptera
- Family: Adelidae
- Genus: Adela
- Species: A. tsaratanana

Binomial name
- Adela tsaratanana (Viette, 1954)

Synonyms
- Nemophora tsaratanana Viette, 1954

Species of moth

Adela tsaratanana is a species of moth of the family Adelidae. It is known from Madagascar.
