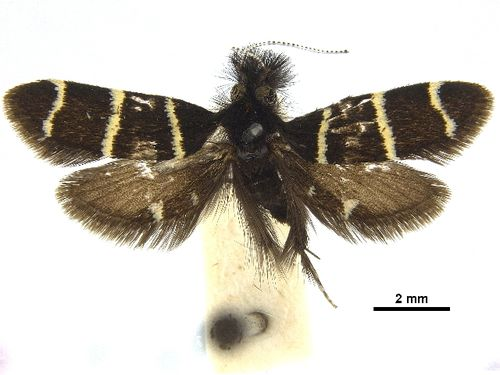

Scientific classification
- Kingdom: Animalia
- Phylum: Arthropoda
- Clade: Pancrustacea
- Class: Insecta
- Order: Lepidoptera
- Family: Adelidae
- Genus: Adela
- Species: A. eldorada

Binomial name
- Adela eldorada Powell, 1969

= Adela eldorada =

Species of moth

Adela eldorada is a moth in the family Adelidae, the fairy longhorn moths. It was described by Jerry A. Powell in 1969. It is found in Sierra Nevada, California, at 460–1,830 m (1,500–6,000 ft).

The length of the forewings is 5.3–6.8 mm (0.21–0.27 in) for males and 5.6–6.9 mm (0.22–0.27 in) for females.
