= Adela pantherellus =

Scientific classification
- Kingdom: Animalia
- Phylum: Arthropoda
- Clade: Pancrustacea
- Class: Insecta
- Order: Lepidoptera
- Family: Adelidae
- Genus: Adela
- Species: A. pantherellus

Binomial name
- Adela pantherellus (Guenée, 1848)

Synonyms
- Nemotois pantherellus Guenée, 1848

Species of moth

Adela pantherellus is a moth of the family Adelidae. It is found in Spain.
