= Adela janineae =

Scientific classification
- Kingdom: Animalia
- Phylum: Arthropoda
- Class: Insecta
- Order: Lepidoptera
- Family: Adelidae
- Genus: Adela
- Species: A. janineae

Binomial name
- Adela janineae (Viette, 1954)

Synonyms
- Nemophora janineae Viette, 1954

Species of moth

Adela janineae is a species of moth of the family Adelidae. It is known from Madagascar.
