= Adela electella =

Scientific classification
- Kingdom: Animalia
- Phylum: Arthropoda
- Class: Insecta
- Order: Lepidoptera
- Family: Adelidae
- Genus: Adela
- Species: A. electella

Binomial name
- Adela electella (Walker, 1863)

Synonyms
- Micropteryx electella Walker, 1863

Species of moth

Adela electella is a species of moth of the family Adelidae. It is known from South Africa.
