= Adela droseropa =

Scientific classification
- Kingdom: Animalia
- Phylum: Arthropoda
- Class: Insecta
- Order: Lepidoptera
- Family: Adelidae
- Genus: Adela
- Species: A. droseropa

Binomial name
- Adela droseropa Meyrick, 1921

Species of moth

Adela droseropa is a species of moth of the family Adelidae. It is known from South Africa.
