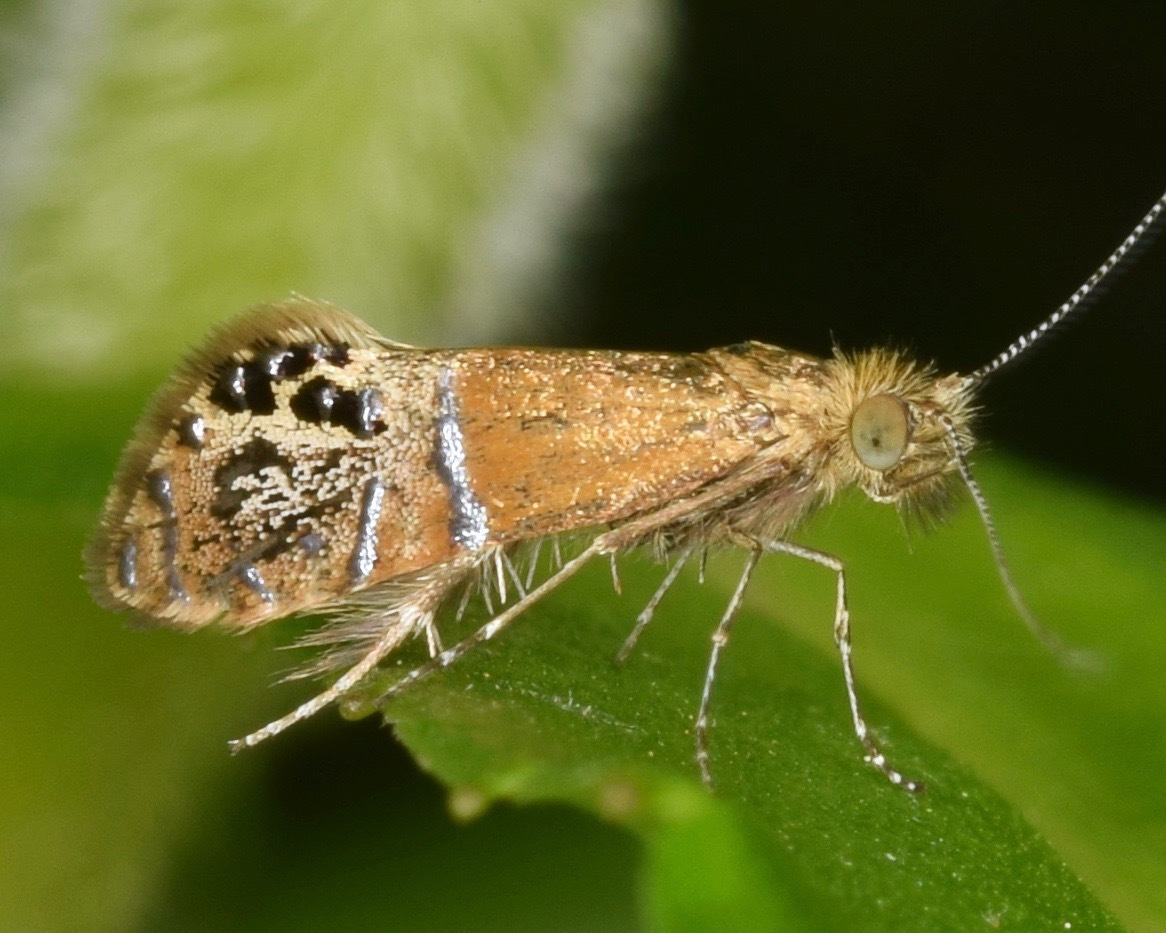

Scientific classification
- Kingdom: Animalia
- Phylum: Arthropoda
- Clade: Pancrustacea
- Class: Insecta
- Order: Lepidoptera
- Family: Adelidae
- Genus: Adela
- Species: A. ridingsella

Binomial name
- Adela ridingsella Clemens, 1864

Synonyms
- Adela corruscifasciella Chambers, 1873; Adela schlaegeri Zeller, 1873

= Adela ridingsella =

Ridings' fairy moth

Species of moth

Adela ridingsella, Ridings' fairy moth, is a moth of the Adelidae family or fairy longhorn moths. It was described by James Brackenridge Clemens in 1864. It is widespread in eastern North America, from Nova Scotia, Ontario, Quebec and Maine to Pennsylvania and the mountains of North Carolina. Adults are on wing from June to July.

Larvae found in petiole galls on Parthenocissus quinquefolia might belong to this species. The larvae later formed external cases.
