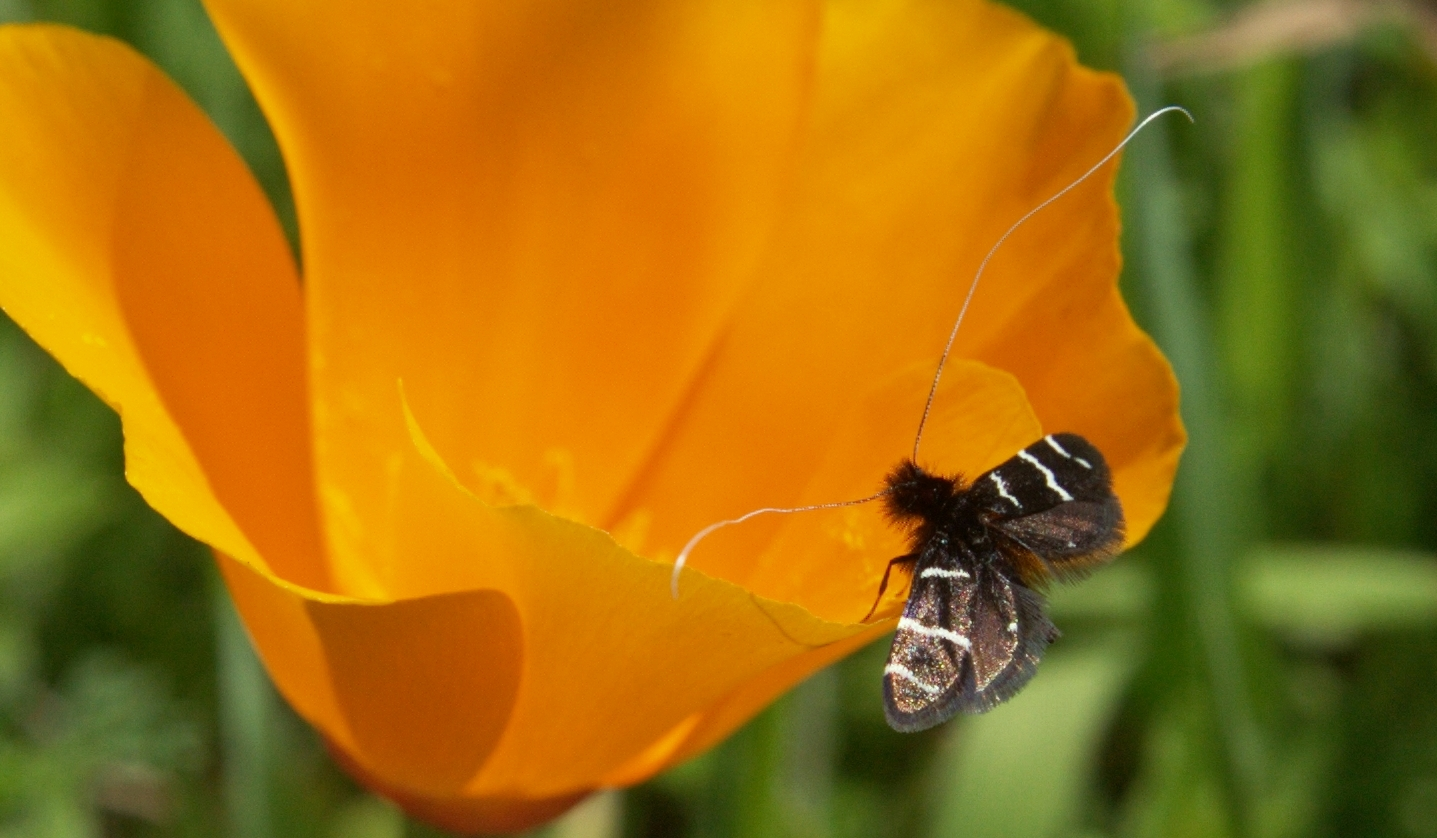

Scientific classification
- Domain: Eukaryota
- Kingdom: Animalia
- Phylum: Arthropoda
- Class: Insecta
- Order: Lepidoptera
- Family: Adelidae
- Genus: Adela
- Species: A. trigrapha

Binomial name
- Adela trigrapha Zeller, 1876

Synonyms
- Adela trifasciella Chambers, 1876; Adela fasciella Chambers, 1876 (not Fabricius, 1775)

= Adela trigrapha =

Species of moth

Adela trigrapha is a moth of the family Adelidae or fairy longhorn moths. It was described by Zeller in 1876 and is found in western North America, from Vancouver Island to California.

The length of the forewings is 5.5–6.2 mm. Adult males have large eyes and long white antenna (three times the forewing length). The forewings are black and usually crossed by three white lines. Females are smaller and have smaller eyes and antennae. They have a bright orange head. The forewings are bright metallic blue and the hindwings are purple.

The larvae possibly feed on Leptosiphon androsaceus and Leptosiphon bicolor.
