= Adela gymnota =

Scientific classification
- Domain: Eukaryota
- Kingdom: Animalia
- Phylum: Arthropoda
- Class: Insecta
- Order: Lepidoptera
- Family: Adelidae
- Genus: Adela
- Species: A. gymnota

Binomial name
- Adela gymnota (Meyrick, 1912)

Synonyms
- Nemotois gymnota Meyrick, 1912

Species of moth

Adela gymnota is a species of moth of the family Adelidae. It is known from Madagascar.
