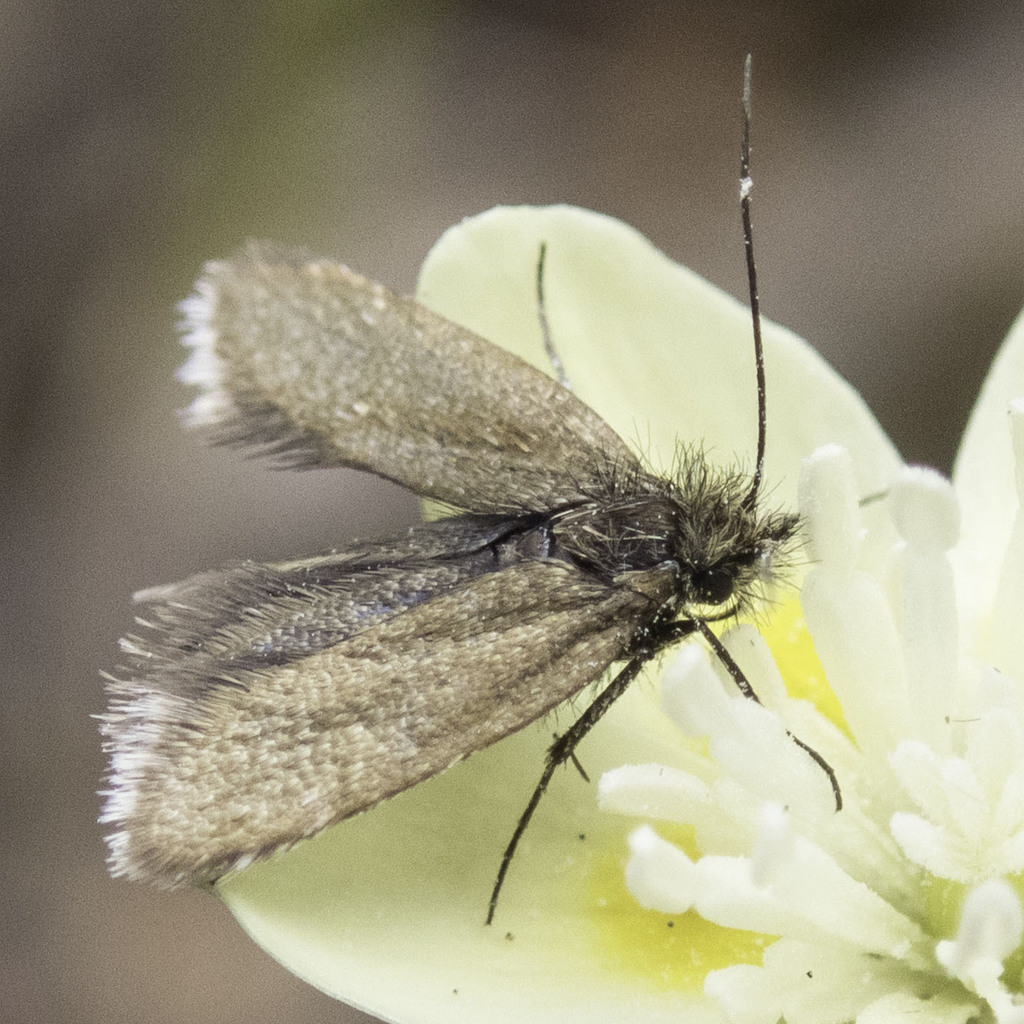

Conservation status
- Imperiled (NatureServe)

Scientific classification
- Kingdom: Animalia
- Phylum: Arthropoda
- Clade: Pancrustacea
- Class: Insecta
- Order: Lepidoptera
- Family: Adelidae
- Genus: Adela
- Species: A. oplerella

Binomial name
- Adela oplerella Powell, 1969

= Adela oplerella =

Opler's longhorn moth

Species of moth

Adela oplerella is a species of moth in the family Adelidae, the fairy longhorn moths.. It is known commonly as Opler's longhorn moth. It is endemic to California. It was described by Jerry A. Powell in 1969 and named for Paul A. Opler, who collected most of the specimens.

The length of forewings is 4.4–5.5 mm (0.17–0.22 in) for males and 5–6.1 mm (0.20–0.24 in) for females.

The moth has usually been collected on creamcups (Platystemon californicus).
