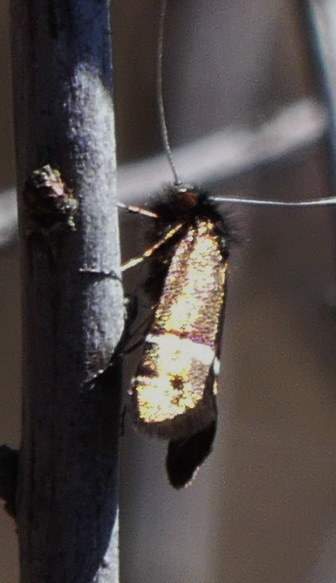
- Purple Fairy Moth (Adela purpurea)

Scientific classification
- Kingdom: Animalia
- Phylum: Arthropoda
- Class: Insecta
- Order: Lepidoptera
- Family: Adelidae
- Genus: Adela
- Species: A. purpurea

Binomial name
- Adela purpurea Walker, 1863

Synonyms
- Adela biviella Zeller, 1873

= Adela purpurea =

Species of moth

Adela purpurea is a moth of the family Adelidae or fairy longhorn moths. It was described by Francis Walker in 1863. It is widespread in boreal North America, from the Yukon through the southern provinces of Canada to Quebec and further south to northern New Jersey.

Adults are on wing from May to June in northern Canada and in April in New England. Adults have been observed visiting Salix blossoms.
