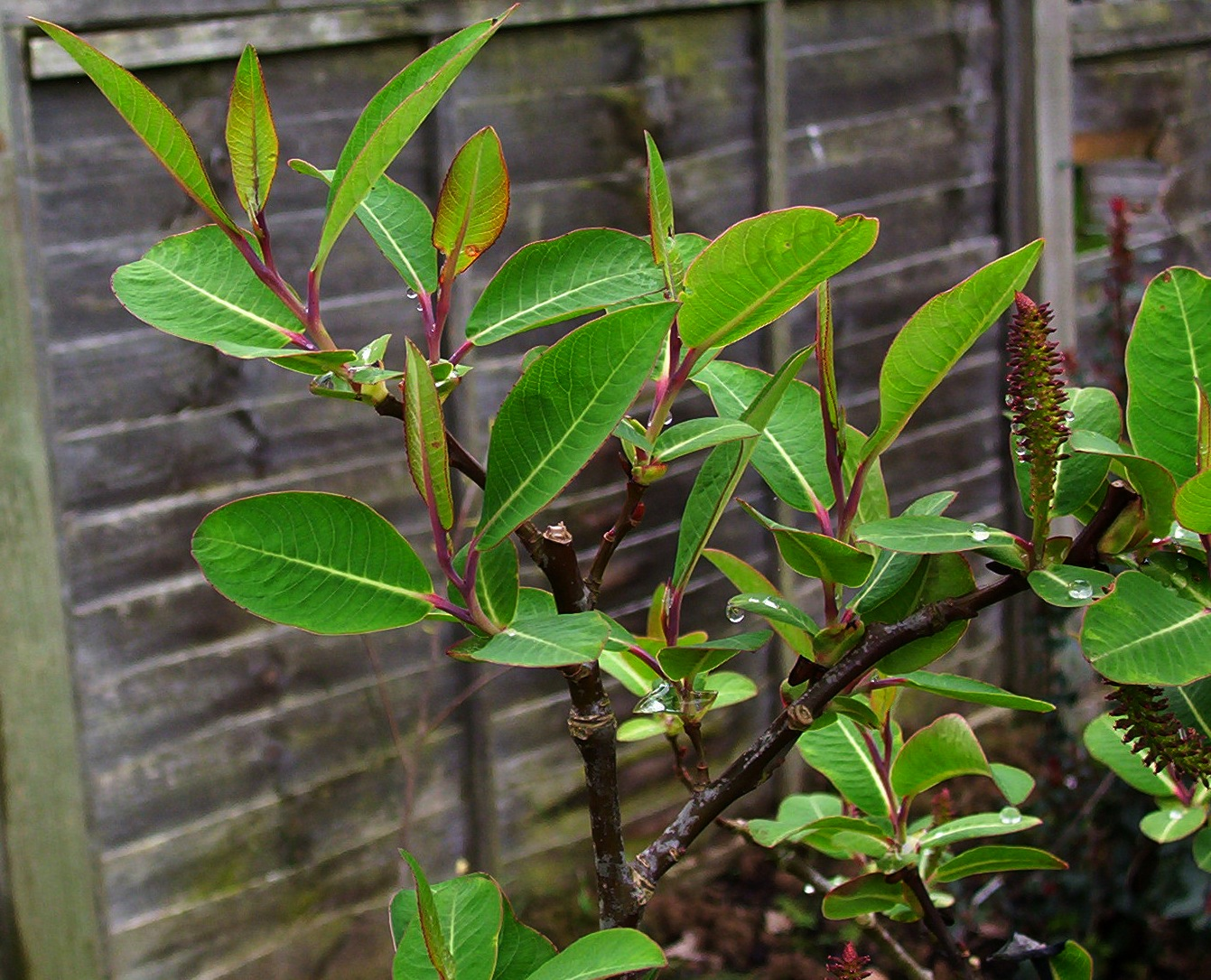

Conservation status
- Vulnerable (IUCN 2.3)

Scientific classification
- Kingdom: Plantae
- Clade: Tracheophytes
- Clade: Angiosperms
- Clade: Eudicots
- Clade: Rosids
- Order: Malpighiales
- Family: Salicaceae
- Genus: Salix
- Species: S. magnifica

Binomial name
- Salix magnifica Hemsl.

= Salix magnifica =

Species of willow

Salix magnifica is a species of willow in the family Salicaceae. It is endemic to Sichuan in southwestern China, where it grows at high altitudes of 2,100–3,000 m above sea level. It is threatened by habitat loss.

It is a deciduous shrub or small tree growing to 6 m (20 ft) tall. The leaves are alternate, 10–25 cm long and 7–12 cm broad, with an entire margin; they are green above, and glaucous below, with red veins and petiole. The flowers are produced in catkins in late spring after the new leaves appear; it is dioecious, with male and female catkins on separate plants. The male catkins are 10 cm long; the female catkins are 10 cm long at pollination, expanding to 25 cm long at seed maturity.

The three varieties are:

- Salix magnifica var. magnifica
- Salix magnifica var. apatela (C.K.Schneider) K.S.Hao
- Salix magnifica var. ulotricha (C.K.Schneider) N.Chao

It is cultivated as an ornamental plant in western Europe for its bold foliage, with the largest leaves of any willow.
