= Gustav Heinrich Heydenreich =

German entomologist

Gustav Heinrich Heydenreich (-, Osnabrück- 18 May 1897) was a German entomologist.

Gustav Heinrich Heydenreich specialised in Lepidoptera. His collection is conserved in Senckenberg Museum. He wrote Lepidopterorum Europaerum Catalogus methodicus, published in Leipzig in 1851, in which he described new species.
