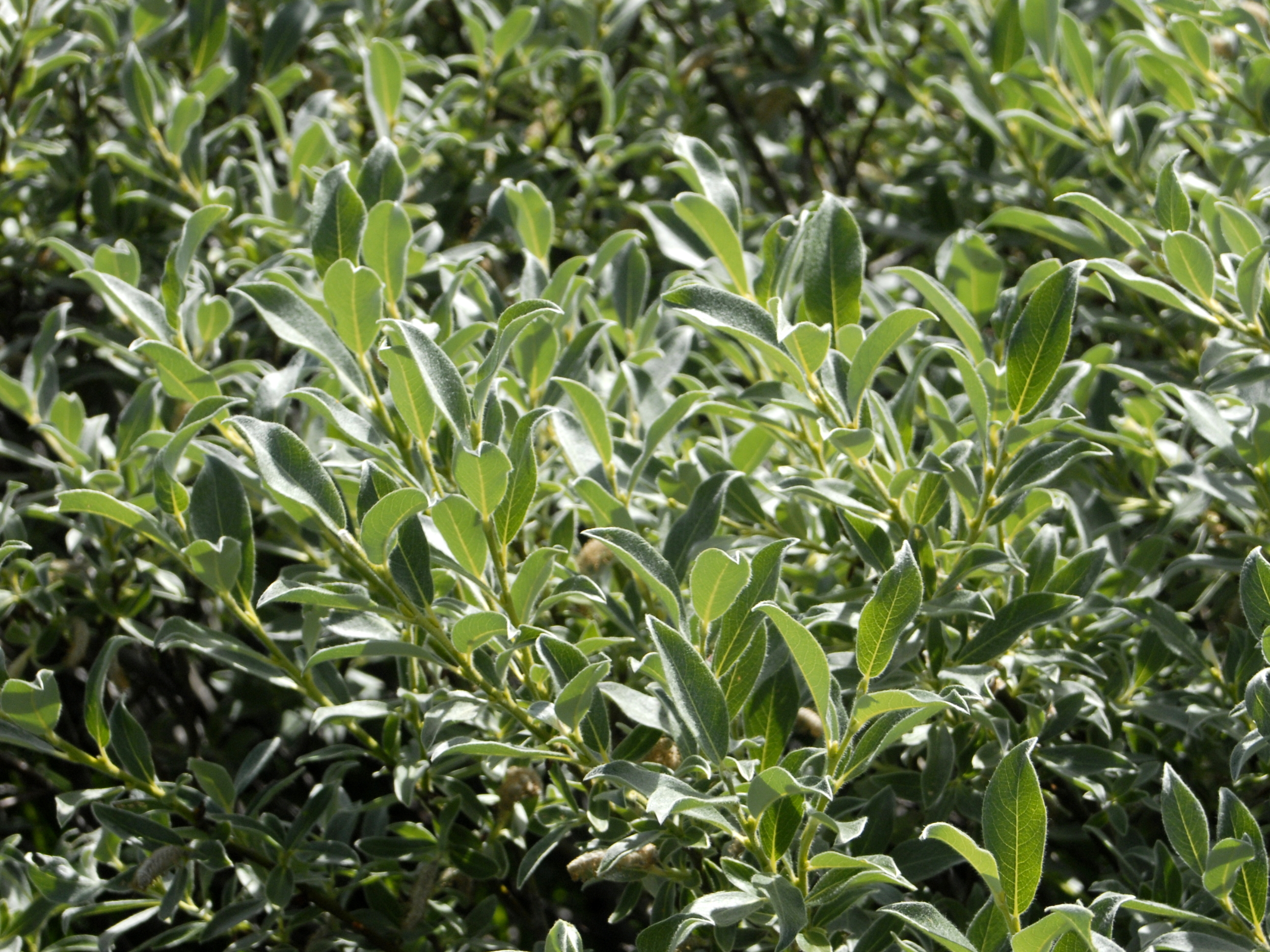
- Salix glaucosericea at the Giardino Botanico Alpino Chanousia

Scientific classification
- Kingdom: Plantae
- Clade: Tracheophytes
- Clade: Angiosperms
- Clade: Eudicots
- Clade: Rosids
- Order: Malpighiales
- Family: Salicaceae
- Genus: Salix
- Species: S. glaucosericea

Binomial name
- Salix glaucosericea Flod.

= Salix glaucosericea =

Species of flowering plant

Salix glaucosericea, common name silky willow or Alpine grey willow, is a species of flowering plant in the Salicaceae family. Some authorities consider it a synonym of Salix glauca var. villosa, which is found in western North America.

== Description ==
Salix glaucosericea can reach a height of 75–125 centimetres (30–49 in). This plant usually develop into a large shrub. The yellow-green, simple leaves are lanceolate, entire and petiolate. Like all willows this species is dioecious. Flowers bloom from June to July.

== Distribution ==
It is present in mountains of Europe (France, Switzerland, Austria, Italy and the Alps).

== Habitat ==
This species can be found on acidic mountain soils at elevations over 1,800 metres (5,900 ft) above sea level.
